= California in the American Civil War =

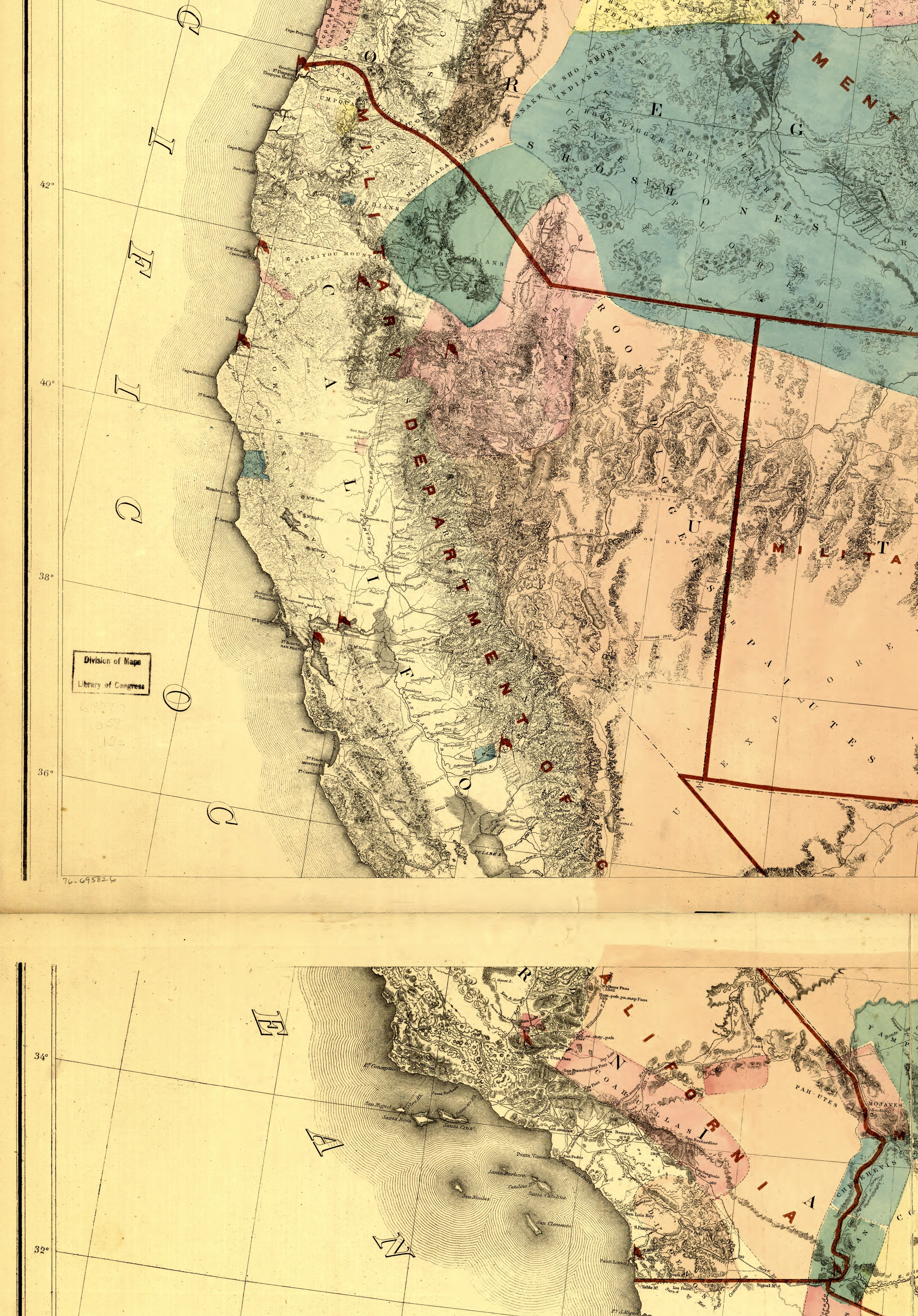
Military Department of California (1858); note the red flags marking U.S. Army posts near Point St. George (likely Fort Ter-Waw, possibly Fort Dick), Fort Humboldt, Fort Jones, Fort Crook, Benicia Arsenal, Presidio of San Francisco, Fort Miller, Fort Tejon, Point Loma, and Fort Yuma

California's involvement in the American Civil War included sending gold east to support the war effort, recruiting volunteer combat units to replace regular U.S. Army units sent east, in the area west of the Rocky Mountains, maintaining and building numerous camps and fortifications, suppressing secessionist activity (many of these secessionists went east to fight for the Confederacy) and securing the New Mexico Territory against the Confederacy. The state of California did not send its units east, but many citizens traveled east and joined the Union Army there.

Democrats had dominated the state from its inception, and Southern Democrats were sympathetic to secession. Although they were a minority in the state, they had become a majority in Southern California and Tulare County, and large numbers resided in San Joaquin, Santa Clara, Monterey, and San Francisco counties. California was home for powerful businessmen who played a significant role in Californian politics through their control of mines, shipping, finance, and the Republican Party but Republicans had been a minority party until the secession crisis. The Civil War split in the Democratic Party allowed Abraham Lincoln to carry the state, albeit by only a slim margin. Unlike most free states, Lincoln won California with only a plurality as opposed to the outright majority in the popular vote.

In the beginning of 1861, as the secession crisis began, the secessionists in San Francisco made a failed attempt to separate the state and Oregon from the union. Southern California, with a majority of discontented Californios and Southern secessionists, had already voted for a separate Territorial government and formed militia units, but were kept from secession after the outbreak of war by Federal troops drawn from the frontier forts of the District of Oregon and District of California (primarily Fort Tejon and Fort Mojave).

Patriotic fervor swept California after the attack on Fort Sumter, providing the manpower for Volunteer regiments recruited mainly from the pro-Union counties in the north of the State. Gold was also provided to support the Union. When the Democratic party split over the war, Republican supporters of Lincoln took control of the state in the September elections. Volunteer regiments were sent to occupy pro-secessionist Southern California and Tulare County. Some Southerners traveled east to join the Confederate Army, evading Union patrols and hostile Apache. Others who remained in the state attempted to outfit a privateer to prey on coastal shipping, and late in the war two groups of partisan rangers were formed.

== From statehood to the Civil War ==
When California was admitted as a state under the Compromise of 1850, Californians had already decided it was to be a free state—the constitutional convention of 1849 unanimously abolished slavery. As a result, Southerners in Congress voted against admission in 1850 while Northerners pushed it through, pointing to its population of 93,000 and its vast wealth in gold. Northern California, which was dominated by mining, shipping, and commercial elites of San Francisco, favored becoming a state.

In the 1856 presidential election, California gave its electoral votes to the winner, James Buchanan.

1856 Presidential Candidate	Party	Home State	Popular Vote	%
James Buchanan	Democrat	Pennsylvania	53,342	48.4
Millard Fillmore	Know-Nothing	New York	36,195	32.8
John Fremont	Republican	California	20,704	18.8

=== Southern California's attempts at secession from California ===
Following California's admission to the Union, Spanish-speaking Californios dissatisfied with inequitable taxes and land laws in lightly populated Southern California attempted three times in the 1850s to achieve a separate statehood or territorial status from Northern California. The last attempt, the Pico Act of 1859, was passed by the California State Legislature, signed by the State governor John B. Weller, approved overwhelmingly by voters in the proposed Territory of Colorado and sent to Washington, D.C., with a strong advocate in Senator Milton Latham. However the secession crisis following the election of Lincoln in 1860 led to the proposal never coming to a vote.

=== Secession crisis in California ===
In 1860 California gave a small plurality of 38,733 votes to Abraham Lincoln, whose 32% of the total vote was enough to win all its electoral votes; 68% voted for the other three candidates.

1860 Presidential Candidate	Party	Popular Vote	%
Abraham Lincoln	Republican	38,733	32.3
Stephen A. Douglas	Northern Democrat	37,999	31.7
John C. Breckinridge	Southern Democrat	33,969	28.3
John Bell	Constitutional Union	9,111	7.6

==== Conspiracy to form a Pacific Republic ====
During the secession crisis following Lincoln's election, Federal troops were under the command of Colonel (Brevet Brigadier General) Albert Sidney Johnston, in Benicia, headquarters of the Department of the Pacific. General Johnston strongly believed in the Southern right to secede but regretted that it was occurring. A group of Southern sympathizers in the state made plans to secede with Oregon to form a "Pacific Republic". The success of their plans rested on the cooperation of General Johnston. Johnston met with some of these Southern men, but before they could propose anything to him he told them that he had heard rumors of an attempt to seize the San Francisco forts and arsenal at Benicia, that he had prepared for that and would defend the facilities under his command with all his resources and to the last drop of his blood. He told them to tell this to their Southern friends. On January 17, 1861 a man named Duncan Beaumont flew a Pacific Republic flag from his boat in the Stockton harbor. The banner was described as "..flag is of silk of the size of the national ensign and with exception of the Union ... a lone star a blue ground is covered by a painting a wild mountain scene a huge bear standing in the foreground and the (words) "Pacific Republic" near the upper border flag." This flag did not fly for long when a little kid was sent up the mast and captured it.

Meanwhile, Union men feared Johnston would aid such a plot and communicated their fears to Washington asking for his replacement. Brig. Gen. Edwin Vose Sumner was soon sent west via Panama to replace Johnston in May 1861. Johnston resigned his commission on May 31, and after Sumner arrived turned over his command and moved with his family to Los Angeles. He would soon travel with other Southerners across New Mexico Territory to Texas and become commander of the Confederacy's western armies. He died at the Battle of Shiloh.

==== Struggle for control of the militia ====
As the secession crisis developed in early 1861, several Volunteer Companies of the California Militia had disbanded because of divided loyalties and new pro-Union ones were sworn in across the state under the supervision of county sheriffs and judges. Many of these units saw no action but some were to form the companies of the earliest California Volunteer regiments. Others like the Petaluma Guard and Emmet Rifles in Sonoma County suppressed a secessionist disturbance in Healdsburg, in 1862. Union commanders relied on the San Bernardino Mounted Rifles and their Captain Clarence E. Bennett for intelligence and help to hold the pro-Southern San Bernardino County for the Union in late 1861 as Federal troops were being withdrawn and replaced by California Volunteers.

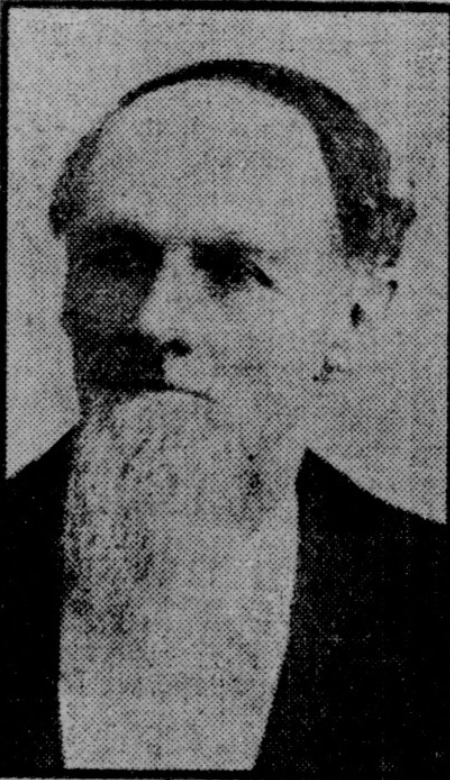
William M. Siddons was the captain of the Sacramento artillery company "Union Boy Squad," (Photographed in 1906)

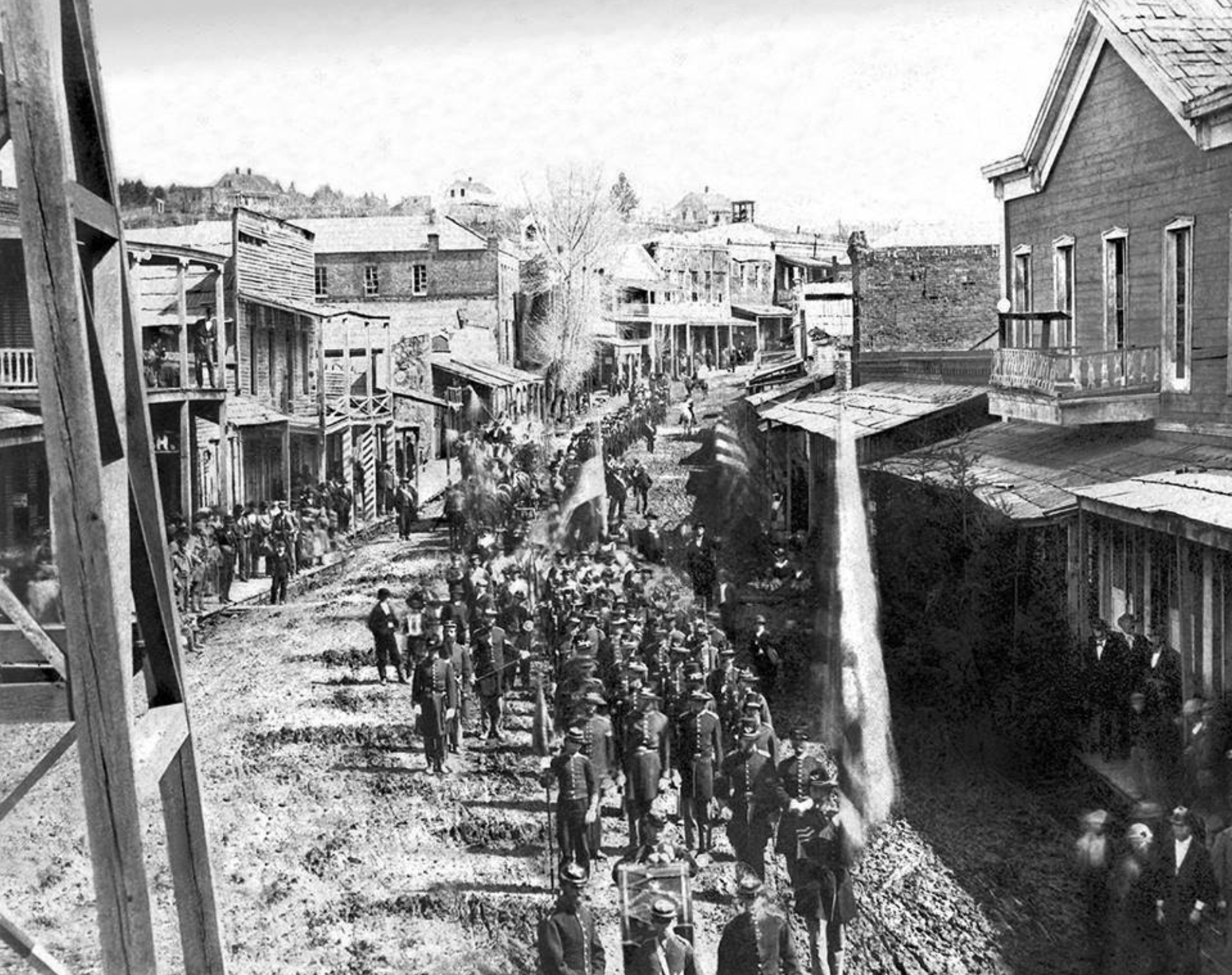
Placerville City Guard c. 1865

In late 1861 a party of squatters sent up east of Waterloo which the courts decided that the land belong to man named Comstock, but they refused to leave. The Stockton Union Guard was called up by Sheriff Hook to help remove the squatters. The squatters were well known Confederate sympathizers. They took positions up within the foundation walls of a brick barn and stated they would shoot anyone who tried to force them to leave. So on November 9, the militia left they're armory with each soldier given three rounds of ammunition and ordered to shoot to kill. When they got to the barn they found that the squatters already left, so the men returned home.

After news of Fort Donelson's surrender reached Santa Clara in 1862, people celebrated by raising national flags and firing off anvils into the sky. Not everyone was happy, especially a woman named Mrs. Dr. Caldwell who raised a "black flag" over her house as a sign of disunion. This act caused a crowd of over 100 people to gather around and watch, while others joined Caldwell and took up positions in the house. The Santa Clara Light Infantry was called out and stationed in front of their armory watching the house and movements of the rebels. Marshal Fred Morris went to the house and told her to take the flag down but she refused. He then told her that she would not be protected if violence arose. She soon removed the flag and the other citizens dispersed without a shot being fired. Soldiers of the militia cheered as Mrs. Caldwell walked angrily towards the armory and threw the black flag at them. The flag was kept in their armory as a war trophy.

In 1864, Alpine county was known as a stronghold of southern sympathizers who terrorized the local unionist community. They looted and burned homes of northern men and refused to pay taxes or even obey local ordinances by the county government. With local peace officers and sheriffs being unable or too intimated to deal with the rebels. That's when the citizens of Markleeville decided too organized a militia to keep law and order. They were called Alpine Rifles and after they were organized the vandalism soon stopped.

In Columbia during the election of 1864 tension arose between secessionist and unionist factions. Secessionists tried to stop all Republicans from voting. They stated "no one of the opposite political party would be allowed to vote at the coming election." They also said one of the ministers in town would not be allowed to deliver a Sunday sermon. The Tuolumne Home Guard was called into service and started storing large quantities of ammunition in the armory. The captain split his company in half, with one half sent to patrol the streets and the other half held in reserve. The minister entered the church holding a rifle and delivered his sermon without challenge. The election was held without any major violence, although there was some skirmishing between the militia and secessionists.

==== Secessionist militias ====
Notable as the only successfully formed pro-Southern militia unit, the Los Angeles Mounted Rifles was organized on March 7, 1861, in Los Angeles County. It included more than a few Californios in its leadership and its ranks, including the County Sheriff Tomas Avila Sanchez. Its leader was one of his Undersheriffs Alonzo Ridley and included several of his deputies.

A. J. King, another Undersheriff of Los Angeles County (and former member of the earlier "Monte Rangers"), and other influential men in El Monte, formed another secessionist militia, the Monte Mounted Rifles on March 23, 1861. However, A. J. King soon ran afoul of Federal authorities. According to the Sacramento Union of April 30, 1861, King was brought before Colonel Carleton and made to take an oath of allegiance to the Union and then released. On April 26, 1861, the Monte Mounted Rifles had asked Governor Downey for arms. The governor sent arms, but army officers at San Pedro stopped the shipment, preventing the activation of the Monte Mounted Rifles.

On March 28, 1861, the newly formed Arizona Territory voted to separate from New Mexico Territory and join the Confederacy. This increased Union officials' fears of a secessionist plan to separate southern California from the state and join the Confederacy. This fear was based on the demonstrated desire for separation in the vote for the Pico Act, the strength of secessionists in the area and their declared intentions and activities, especially in forming militia companies.

In February of 1861 in the northern part of San Joaquin County, a party of 30 men were drilling under a Bear Flag. Later the group requested the services of a local Mexican-American War Veteran to act as their drill sergeant but he declined.

== Outbreak of the Civil War ==
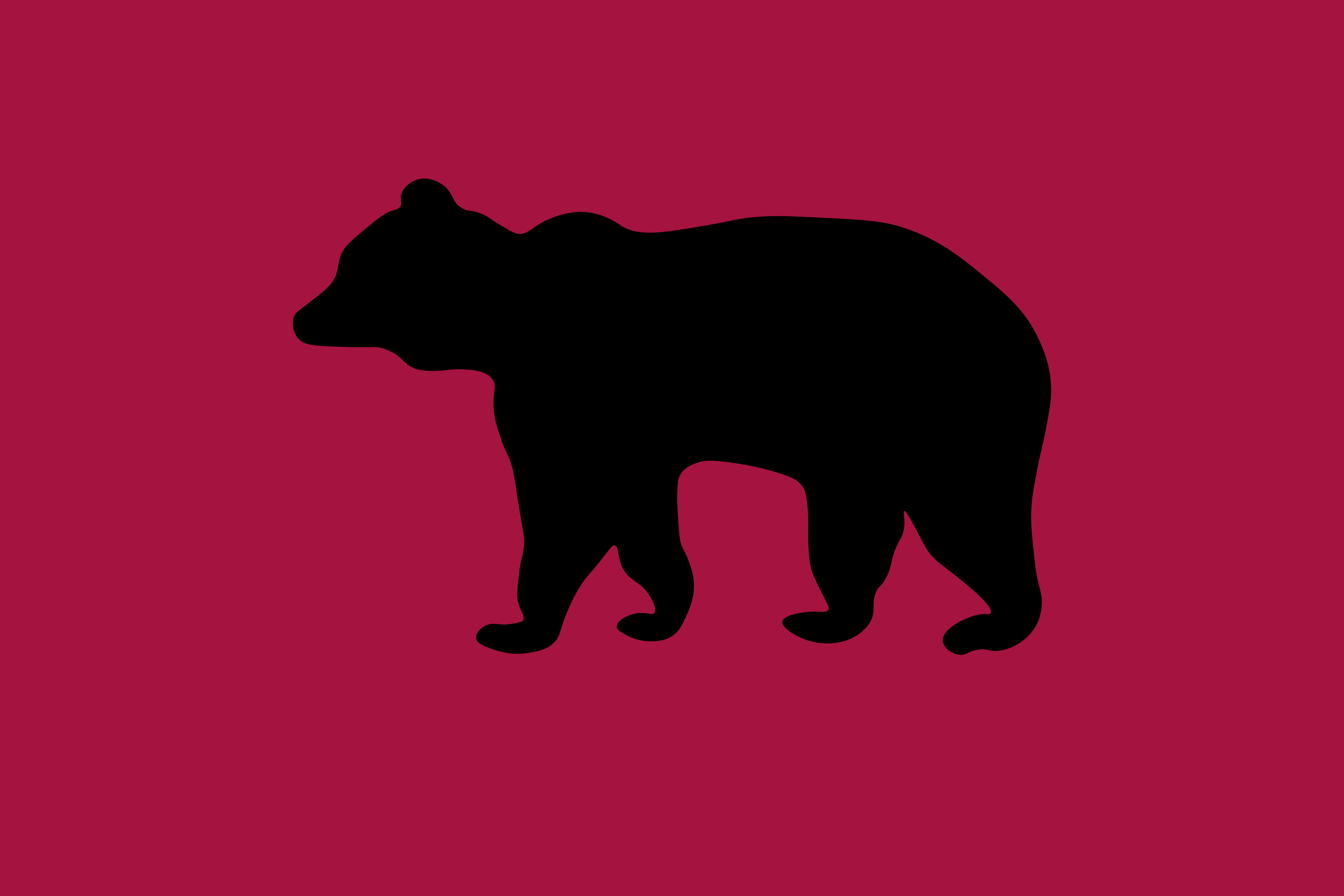
Digital reconstruction of the Bear Flag raised by secessionists in Los Angeles on May 29, 1861

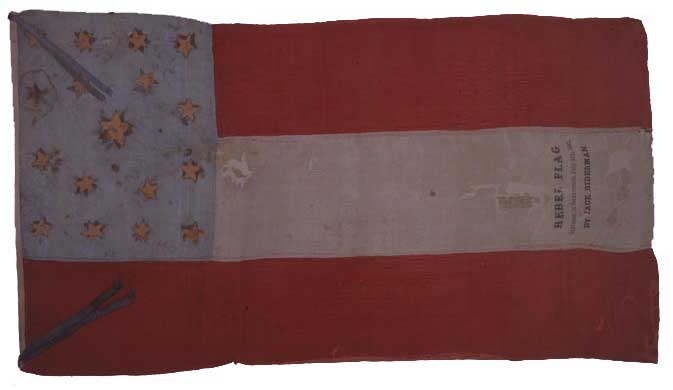
The J. P. Gillis Flag, 1861

=== Reaction to the outbreak of war in California ===
At the outbreak of the Civil War, Southern California secession seemed possible; the populace was largely in favor of it, militias with secessionist sympathies had been formed, and Bear Flags, the banner of the Bear Flag Revolt, had been flown for several months by secessionists in Los Angeles and San Bernardino counties. Two of the Bear Flags were described as "...(4 x 6 feet) with a dark blue field with a single white. The star the scenery appears to represent the foot-hills of our State, and a pine and Manzanita tree appear. An enormous grizzly is the principal-feature of in the painting," and "a deep red flag with a black bear painted on it," and saw no other flag with them. There were no stripes or stars (just) covered with red..." In April two bear flags flew from the Sacramento and San Jose fire stations; they both bore a single star with a grizzly bear. After word of the Battle of Fort Sumter reached California, there were public demonstrations by secessionists. However secession quickly became impossible when three companies of Federal cavalry were moved from Fort Mojave and Fort Tejon to Camp Fitzgerald in Los Angeles in May and June 1861. On May 24 a large mob of secessionist in San Francisco planned to sack the pro-union newspapers Democrat and Anzeiger. Soon the local police and militia were called up to stop the violence, they were both armed with rifles and stationed out front of the offices. Around 10 o'clock the mob started "hooting and yelling," and walked angrily towards the offices. The troops and police were ordered to charge and clear the streets which they did, making the mob retreat with no casualties and stopping any further threats of violence.

Digital reconstruction of the secessionist flag flown in Alpine county in June of 1861

Suspected by local Union authorities, General Johnston evaded arrest and with Lewis Armistead joined the Los Angeles Mounted Rifles as a private. Leaving Warner's Ranch on May 27, they journeyed across the southwestern deserts to Texas, crossing the Colorado River into the Confederate Territory of Arizona, on July 4, 1861. The Los Angeles Mounted Rifles disbanded and members joined the Confederate Army shortly after they reached the Confederate Arizona Territorial capital of Mesilla (in what was then part of the United States' New Mexico Territory and is now New Mexico). Like other pro-Confederates leaving California for the Confederacy, the Rifles joined up principally with Texas regiments. However General Johnston joined the fight in the east as a general with the Confederacy and was later killed leading their army at the Battle of Shiloh. Armistead died leading Pickett's Charge at the Battle of Gettysburg.

Confederate flag carried though the streets of Red Bluff in 1863

One of the few captured Confederate flags in California during the Civil War took place on July 4, 1861, in Sacramento. During Independence Day celebrations, secessionist Major George P. Gilliss, an engineer and Mexican War veteran, celebrated the independence of the United States from Britain as well as the southern states from the Union. He unfurled a Confederate flag of his own design and proceeded to march down the street to both the applause and jeers of onlookers. Jack Biderman and Curtis Clark, enraged by Gilliss' actions, accosted him and "captured" the flag. The flag itself is based on the First National flag of the Confederacy, the Stars and Bars. However, the canton contains seventeen stars rather than the Confederate's seven. Because the flag was captured by Jack Biderman, it is often also referred to as the "Biderman Flag".

=== California volunteers called up ===
California (along with Oregon and Kansas) was not included in the initial callup of 75,000 militia due to its vast distance from the rest of the country. It was only later, as he was recalling Federal troops to the east, on July 24, 1861, the Secretary of War called on Governor John G. Downey to furnish one regiment of infantry and five companies of cavalry to guard the overland mail route from Carson City to Salt Lake City. Three weeks later four more regiments of infantry and a regiment of cavalry were requested. All of these were volunteer units recruited and organized in the counties of the northern part of the state, especially around San Francisco Bay region and the mining camps in counties in the foothills of the Sierra Nevada Mountains; few recruits came from the counties of Southern California. These volunteers replaced the regular troops transferred to the east before the end of 1861.

=== Turmoil in Southern California ===
Charged with all the supervision of Los Angeles, San Bernardino, San Diego, and Santa Barbara Counties, on August 14, 1861, Major William Scott Ketchum steamed from San Francisco to San Pedro and made a rapid march to encamp near San Bernardino on August 26 and with Companies D and G of the 4th Infantry Regiment later reinforced at the beginning of September by a detachment of ninety First U.S. Dragoons and a howitzer. Except for frequent sniping at his camp, Ketchum's garrison stifled any secessionist uprising from Belleville and a show of force by the Dragoons in the streets of San Bernardino at the end of election day quelled a secessionist political demonstration during the September gubernatorial elections in San Bernardino County.

Thereafter, with the Democrats split over the war, the first Republican governor of California, Leland Stanford, was elected on September 4, 1861.

1861 Gubernatorial Candidate	Party	Popular Vote	%
Leland Stanford	Republican	56,056	46.4
John R. McConnell	Southern Democrat	33,750	28.0
John Conness	Northern Democrat	30,944	25.6

Following the elections on September 7, there was a gunfight resulting from a robbery of travelers to Bear Valley and Holcomb Valley on the pack trail in the Upper Santa Ana Canyon where the Santa Ana River runs out of the San Bernardino Mountains. It was suspected by Union men that secessionists had been the culprits, doing the robbery as part of a larger plan of robberies in the valleys of Los Angeles and San Bernardino Counties. However, no such plan materialized. In the later part of the war, an Oregon newspaper reported that bands of horse thieves in Southern California and elsewhere carried with them the Confederate flag.

== Civil War conflicts within California ==
=== Securing Southern California ===
As the California Volunteer regiments formed, some were sent south with Colonel George Wright, commanding officer of the District of Southern California. He was to replace the Federal troops in Los Angeles, gathered there to prevent a rising by the numerous secessionist sympathizers in Southern California. In October 1861, Wright was promoted to Brigadier General of Volunteers and placed in command of the Department of the Pacific, replacing Sumner who had recommended Wright as his replacement. Colonel James Henry Carleton of the 1st California Volunteer Infantry Regiment replaced Wright as commander in the south. Detachments were soon sent out by Carleton to San Bernardino and San Diego Counties to secure them for the Union and prevent the movement of men, horses and weapons eastward to the Confederacy.

One of the earliest conflicts related to the Civil War in California occurred on November 29, 1861, at Minter Ranch, in the hills just south and west of the San Jose Valley, where Warner's Ranch and the military post of Camp Wright was located. Dan Showalter's party of secessionists, like some others, were attempting to avoid the post and make their way across the desert to join the Confederate Army in Texas. They were pursued from Temecula by a Volunteer Cavalry patrol from the camp, intercepted and captured without shots being fired. Later after being imprisoned at Fort Yuma, Showalter and the others were released after swearing loyalty to the Union, but they made their way to the Confederacy later. Earlier in the month in Los Angeles, a secessionist was pistol-whipped and fatally injured by a soldier with whom he had been drinking after the man praised Jefferson Davis and P. G. T. Beauregard.

New Camp Carleton was established on March 22, 1862, near El Monte; its garrison was to keep an eye on that hotbed of secessionist sympathies. On April 10, 1862, as the United States Marshal for Southern California, Henry D. Barrows, wrote to the commander of Union Army Department of the Pacific in San Francisco, complaining of anti-Union sentiment in Southern California. The letter says such sentiment "permeates society here among both the high and the low", and reports:

A. J. King, under-sheriff of this county, who has been a bitter secessionist, who said to me that he owed no allegiance to the United States Government; that Jeff Davis's was the only constitutional government we had, and that he remained here because he could do more harm to the enemies of that Government by staying here than going there; brought down on the Senator (a steam ship) Tuesday last a large lithograph gilt-framed portrait of Beauregard, the rebel general, which he flaunted before a large crowd at the hotel when he arrived. I induced Colonel Carleton to have him arrested as one of the many dangerous secessionists living in our midst, and to-day he was taken to Camp Drum. He was accompanied by General Volney E. Howard as counsel, and I have but little hope that he will be retained in custody.

=== Naval incidents ===
During and after the 1862 Confederate New Mexico Campaign, no rising against Union control occurred in the state. However, in the following years some attempts were made by the Confederate navy to seize gold and silver for the Confederacy.

==== J. M. Chapman plot ====
In 1863, Asbury Harpending, after traveling secretly to Richmond to obtain a letter of marque, joined with other California members of the Knights of the Golden Circle in San Francisco to outfit the schooner J. M. Chapman as a Confederate privateer in San Francisco Bay. Their object was to raid commerce on the Pacific coast carrying gold and silver shipments, to capture and carry it back to support the Confederacy. Their attempt was detected and they were seized on March 15, during the night of their intended departure, by the USS Cyane, revenue officers and San Francisco police.

==== Salvador pirates ====
In spring of 1864, the Confederate navy ordered Captain Thomas Egenton Hogg and his command to take passage on board a coastal steamer in Panama City, seize her on the high seas, arm her and attack the Pacific Mail steamers and the whalers in the North Pacific. In Havana, the American consul, Thomas Savage, learned about this conspiracy, and notified Rear Admiral George F. Pearson at Panama City. The Admiral had the passengers boarding the steamers at Panama City watched and when Hogg's command was found aboard the Panama Railroad steamer Salvador, a force from the USS Lancaster arrested and search them finding pistols, ammunition, handcuffs and a Confederate flag. After being detained they were soon brought to San Francisco. Tried by a military commission, they were sentenced to be hanged, but General Irvin McDowell commuted their sentences. To prevent any further attempts to seize Pacific coast shipping, General McDowell ordered each passenger on board American merchant steamers to surrender all weapons when boarding the ship and every passenger and his baggage was searched. All officers were armed for the protection of their ships.

=== Partisan Rangers in California ===
Late in the war, local secessionists in California made attempts to seize gold and silver for the Confederacy. In early 1864, Rufus Henry Ingram, formerly with Quantrill's Raiders, arrived in Santa Clara County and with Tom Poole (formerly a member of the crew of the J. M. Chapman), organized local Knights of the Golden Circle and commanded them in what became known as Captain Ingram's Partisan Rangers. In the Bullion Bend Robbery they robbed two stagecoaches near Placerville of their silver and gold, leaving a letter explaining they were not bandits but carrying out a military operation to raise funds for the Confederacy.

Also in early 1864, secessionist Judge George Gordon Belt, a rancher and former alcalde in Stockton, organized a group of partisan rangers including John Mason and "Jim Henry" and sent them out to recruit more men and pillage the property of Union men in the countryside. For the next two years the Mason Henry Gang, as they became known, posed as Confederate partisan rangers but acted as outlaws, committing robberies, thefts and murders in the southern San Joaquin Valley, Santa Cruz County, Monterey County, Santa Clara County, and in counties of Southern California. However, despite all these efforts no captured gold was sent to the Confederacy.

In the spring of 1865, Tehachapi valley had bands of guerrillas that started robbing union men of their property, and sometimes killing them. The Army was called to deal with the problem, but no troops could be provided to the valley.

=== 1864 election ===
In July 1864, with many Douglas Democrats having deserted their party over the war, the remaining Democrats formed a fusion party behind the former governor John G. Downey, opposed to continuation of the war, emancipation, the arrest of civilians by the military, the suppression of free speech and of the press and racial equality. The result in the September election was a second Republican governor of California, Frederick F. Low.

1864 Gubernatorial Candidate	Party	Popular Vote	%
Frederick F. Low	Republican	64,447	58.9
John G. Downey	Democratic	44,843	41.1

Lincoln won the 1864 election with almost 59% in California.

1864 Presidential Candidate	Party	Popular Vote	%
Abraham Lincoln	Republican	62,053	58.6
George B. McClellan	Northern Democrat	43,837	41.4

== Civil War Era forts and camps in California ==
At this time, the U.S. had a number of military forts to defend against the Indian threat, and to solidify the U.S. claim to the state. As the conflict began, new forts and camps were founded to protect ports and communications, carry out operations against the Indians, to hold off Confederate soldiers and suppress their sympathizers.

Mustering and training camps for the California Volunteer units were organized at Camp Union south of Sacramento, Camp Sigel, near Auburn, Benicia Barracks, Camp Downy and Camp Merchant near Oakland and Camp Alert near San Francisco, Camp Lyon, Camp Sumner, and the Presidio in San Francisco.

Of the ports, San Francisco Bay was the most important; a coastal fortification at Fort Point was built at the edge of the Presidio, and another supporting installation at Fort Baker on the Marin Headlands. One Civil War-era fort, Post of Alcatraz Island or Fort Alcatraz, on a rocky island just inside the Golden Gate, later became an infamous Federal penitentiary, Alcatraz. The San Francisco Bay was also protected by the Navy at Mare Island, the Benicia Arsenal, and Fort Mason with the posts at San Francisco's Point San Jose, and Camp Reynolds on Angel Island. San Pedro was protected from January 1862 by Camp Drum, later the Drum Barracks, and later a post was established at Two Harbors on Catalina Island called Camp Santa Catalina. San Diego was only defended by a small garrison at the New San Diego Depot occupied in 1860.

In the northwest of the state were several forts, Fort Bragg on the Mendocino County coast supporting Fort Wright. Further north on the coast of Humboldt County was Fort Humboldt, established to maintain peace between the Native Americans and new settlers and Headquarters of the Humboldt Military District supporting other forts in the area. Ulysses S. Grant was briefly stationed here prior to the war. Fort Humboldt supported Camp Curtis, Fort Gaston, Camp Lyon, Fort Baker, Fort Iaqua, Fort Anderson, and Fort Seward which were the base of operations for the soldiers in the Bald Hills War. Camp Lincoln was established north of Crescent City near the Smith River to guard the native people on the Smith River Reservation from settlers and keep prisoners of war from the Bald Hills War settled there from escaping.

In the Northeast were Fort Crook in Shasta County, from which patrols occasionally engaged the Pit River tribes. In Modoc County, Fort Bidwell was established in the far northwestern corner of the state in 1863 to guard against the Snake Indians.

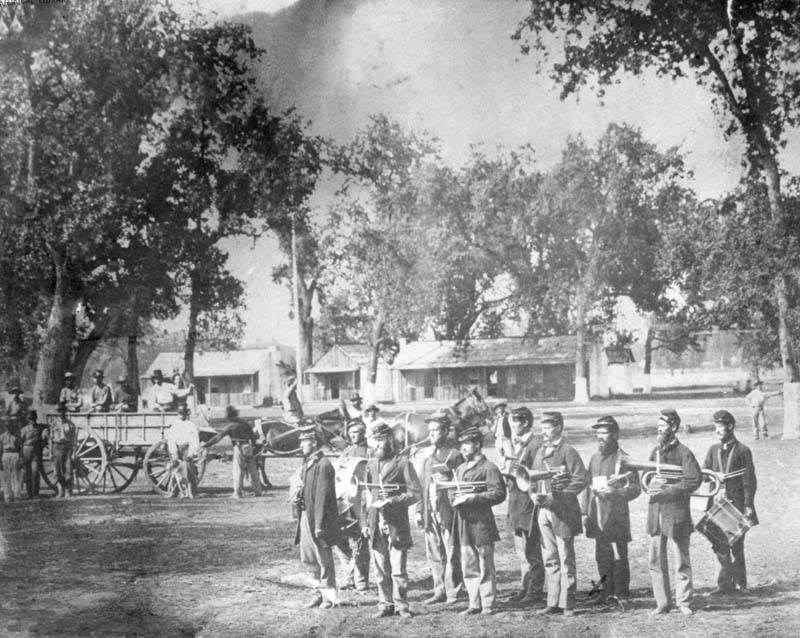
Camp Babbitt c1862

To the south there was Fort Miller in the foothills of the southern Sierra Nevada in Fresno County, and Camp Babbitt outside the town of Visalia, in Tulare County. Fort Tejon in the Grapevine Canyon (La Cañada de las Uvas) had protected the southern San Joaquin Valley and Southern California. It had been the headquarters of the First U.S. Dragoons until those regular army troops were transferred in July 1861 upon the outbreak of war. Fort Tejon was reoccupied by California volunteer troops in 1863 to guard Paiute Indians from the Owens Valley at the nearby Sebastian Indian Reservation and then it was abandoned for good on September 11, 1864. Camp Independence was established on Oak Creek nearby modern Independence, California on July 4, 1862, during the Owens Valley Indian War.

At the beginning of the war Union authorities were worried that the large number of secessionist sympathizers in Southern California might rise in an attempt to join the Confederacy. In June 1861 troops withdrawn from Fort Tejon and Fort Mojave established Camp Fitzgerald outside Los Angeles in various locations as each proved unsuitable.

In late September 1861, troops from Northern California landed in San Pedro and marched to establish a new camp at a more suitable location at Camp Latham in modern Culver City. From this post Ketchum's regular soldiers were relieved on October 20 by three companies of 1st California Cavalry sent out to San Bernardino County. and establish Camp Carleton and later Camp Morris. Volunteer troops were also sent to Camp Wright in San Diego County to watch the southern overland approach to California across the Colorado Desert from Fort Yuma, located on the west bank of the Colorado River.

In March 1862, all the troops that were drilling at Camp Latham were transferred to Camp Drum, leaving a company of soldiers to observe the Los Angeles area. Following flooding at Camp Carleton, the garrison moved to New Camp Carleton, built near the secessionist hotbed of El Monte in 1862.

== Civil War military units associated with California ==
Due to its location, the state's local militia companies remained under state status because of the great number of Southern sympathizers, the Indian threat, and possible foreign attack. The state followed the usual military practice of mustering militia companies into regiments. These Volunteers maintained military posts vacated by the regular army units that were ordered east. However a number of state militias disbanded and went east. Several of these companies offered their services and were accepted by the Union Army.

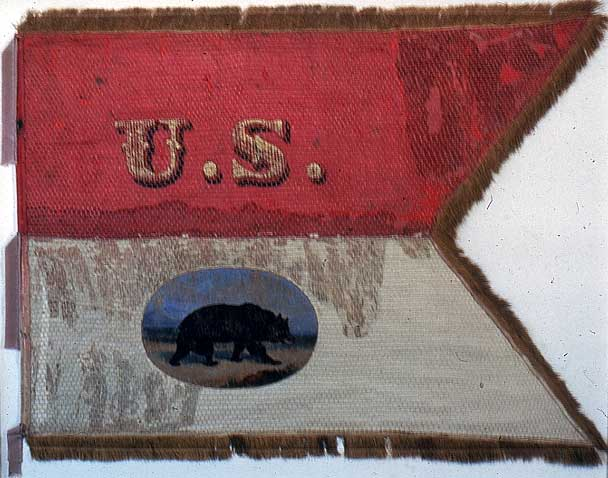
Company Guidon, Company A ('California' 100)

In 1862, five companies of the 2nd Massachusetts Cavalry (also known as The California 100 and the California Cavalry Battalion) were enrolled and mustered into service, and sent to Massachusetts. They left San Francisco by sea for service in the east. The California Battalion consisted of Companies A, C, F, L, and M. They participated in 51 battles, campaigns, and skirmishes.

Oregon U.S. Senator Edward D. Baker raised a regiment of men on the East Coast. These units and others were generally known as the "California Regiment", but later designated the 71st Pennsylvania Infantry. Col. Roderick N. Matheson was the leader of the 32nd New York Infantry, also known as the 1st California Regiment.

In October 1861, Colonel Baker was authorized to increase his command to a brigade. The additional regiments were commanded by Colonels Joshua T. Owen, DeWitt Clinton Baxter, and Turner G. Morehead, all from Philadelphia, respectively designated the 2nd, 3rd, and 5th California Regiments. The 4th California Regiment, as planned, was composed of artillery and cavalry. These troops were soon detached. After Baker was killed in the Battle of Ball's Bluff, Pennsylvania claimed these four infantry regiments as a part of its quota, and they became known as the "Philadelphia Brigade" of Pennsylvania Volunteers. They were initially commanded by Brig. Gen. William W. Burns and first served in John Sedgwick's Division of the II Corps, Army of the Potomac. They had a distinguished service career, highlighted by their actions at the Battle of Antietam and their prominent position in the defense against Pickett's Charge at the Battle of Gettysburg.

Military units associated with California included:

- Los Angeles Mounted Rifles (Confederate)
- Monte Mounted Rifles (Confederate)
- Captain Ingram's Partisan Rangers (Confederate)
- Mason Henry Gang (Confederate)
- 2nd Regiment of Cavalry, Massachusetts Volunteers Company A, E, F, L, and M (the later four called the "California Battalion")
- 32nd Regiment of New York Volunteers
- "Philadelphia Brigade" of Pennsylvania Volunteers
  - 1st California Infantry - 71st Pennsylvania Infantry
  - 2nd California Infantry - 69th Pennsylvania Infantry
  - 3rd California Infantry - 72nd Pennsylvania Infantry
  - 5th California Infantry - 106th Pennsylvania Infantry

== Regiments of the California volunteers in federal service ==
California Troops drilling at Kennedy Farm near Oakland, 1862

The California Volunteer units recruited 15,725 volunteers for Federal service. Nearly all served inside California and in the Department of the Pacific and the Department of New Mexico. These units included two full regiments and one battalion of Native Cavalry, eight full regiments and two battalions of infantry, one of Veterans and another called Mountaineers that specialized in fighting in the mountainous Redwood forests and Bald Hills of Northwestern California. California's Volunteers conducted many operations against the native peoples within the states of California and Oregon, and in the western territories within the Departments of the Pacific and New Mexico, to secure these lands for the Union. Some of most significant of these were the Snake War, Bald Hills War, Owens Valley Indian War, Chiricahua Wars and Carson's Campaign against the Navajo. There was an idea to raised a regiment made up of Chinese men, and it was promoted by a prominent Chinese merchant but it was denied by officials.

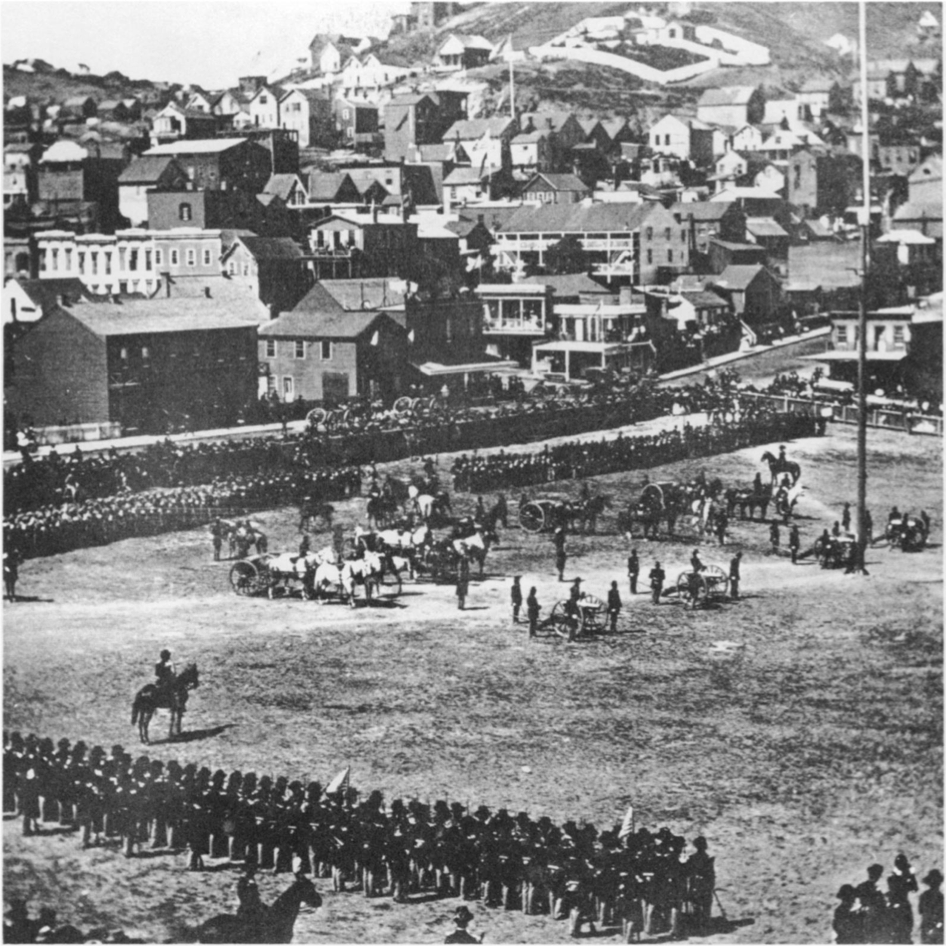
Volunteers in Washington Square, San Francisco on July 4,1862

List of California Civil War units

The California Volunteers most directly in action against the Confederacy were known as the California Column. They were under the command of General James Henry Carleton. At various times the following units served with the Column: 1st Regiment California Volunteer Cavalry, 1st Battalion of Native Cavalry, and the 1st, 5th and 7th Regiment California Volunteer Infantry. This force served in Arizona, New Mexico, and Texas, driving out the Confederate force in the Arizona Territory and defending New Mexico Territory and the southern overland route to California and operating against the Apache, Navajo, Comanche and other tribes.

The command composed of 2nd Regiment California Volunteer Cavalry and the 3rd Regiment California Volunteer Infantry under P. Edward Connor kept the Central Overland Route to California open. As a matter of Connor's proactive style, he led these troops to attack Shoshoni Indians at the Bear River Massacre near what is now the city of Preston, Idaho, on January 29, 1863.

Detachments from the 2nd Regiment California Volunteer Cavalry from Camp Latham under Lieutenant Colonel George S. Evans, fought in the Owens Valley Indian War, and established Camp Independence in 1862.

The 2nd, 4th, 6th, and 8th Regiment California Volunteer Infantry and the 1st Battalion California Volunteer Mountaineers provided internal security in Northern California, Oregon, and Washington Territory. 2nd and 6th Volunteer Infantry Regiments and the 1st Battalion California Volunteer Mountaineers served in the Bald Hills War and some other companies in the Snake War.

Also the 1st Regiment Washington Territory Volunteer Infantry, had eight companies that were recruited in California during 1862, for service in Washington Territory. They were mustered out at Fort Vancouver in 1865.

== The navy and the Civil War in the Pacific ==
- Pacific Squadron Operations

== Lincoln Riot ==
After news of Lincoln assassination reached San Francisco, many grieved, while other celebrated. Unionists in the city thought they needed to punish Democrat Newspaper offices that had been criticizing the President throughout the war. So on April 20, around 2-3 o'clock a mob formed around the offices of the Democratic Pres and sacked it. They threw typewriters and other printing material down the stairs and out the windows of the office. The debris started to pile up on to the street with one newspaper describing the office as "completely destroyed and gutted." A large crowd gathered to watch the destruction with none attempting to help the office.

The military command of the west coast requested help from the city's militias to stop the mob from ransacking the offices. Some of the militias were stationed outside offices to deter the mob.

After attacking the Democratic Pres, the mob moved on the Marriot’s News Letter and destroyed it. At that time Chief Burke, with two companies of police armed with rifles and bayonets fixed, moved up Clay Street. The police pushed the mob away from the office, but the mob ran up the street to the Monitor. It shared the same fate as the others. The crowd then moved to the Occidenta and later Vox de Mejico, after which the mob dispersed. The militias were soon relieved by federal volunteers from Alcatraz to help restore order. No one was killed, but the offices were heavily damaged, with some being burnt to the ground.

== Past residents of California in the Civil War ==
The following famous people visited or lived in California before, during or after the Civil War.

- Lewis Addison Armistead
- Edward Dickinson Baker
- Edward Fitzgerald Beale
- James Henry Carleton
- Mark Twain (Samuel Clemens)
- Patrick Edward Connor
- Ulysses S. Grant
- Antonio Maria de la Guerra
- William M. Gwin
- John Charles Frémont
- Henry Wager Halleck
- Winfield Scott Hancock
- Joseph Hooker
- Albert Sidney Johnston
- Custis Lee
- Thaddeus S.C. Lowe
- Roderick N. Matheson
- Henry Morris Naglee
- Norton I
- Edward Otho Cresap Ord
- William Starke Rosecrans
- William Tecumseh Sherman
- George Stoneman
- Joseph Rodman West

== See also ==
- California State Military Museum
- History of California through 1899
