= District of California =

The District of California was a Union Army command department formed during the American Civil War. The district was part of the Department of the Pacific, the commander of the department also being District commander. The district was created as a separate command on July 1, 1864, after Irvin McDowell took command of the Department of the Pacific, relieving General Wright, who then remained as District of California commander. The District comprised the state of California and the areas of the Rogue River and Umpqua River in Southern Oregon. Its headquarters were in San Francisco, co-located with those of the Department of the Pacific. On March 14, 1865, the District of Oregon was extended to include the entire state of Oregon, removing the Rogue River and Umpqua River areas from the District.

== District of California commanders ==
- Albert Sidney Johnston, January 1861 - March 1861
- Edwin Vose Sumner, March 1861 - October 1861
- George Wright, October 1861 - June 27, 1865

On June 27, 1865, the Military Division of the Pacific was created under Major General Henry W. Halleck, replacing the Department of the Pacific. It consisted of the Department of California and the Department of the Columbia, which replaced the District of Oregon. George Wright, now a U. S. Army Brigadier General, was assigned to command the new Department of the Columbia.

== Oregon posts in the District of California 1861-1865 ==
- Fort Umpqua, 1856–1862
- Camp Baker, 1862-1865
- Fort Klamath 1863-1865 -source is Official Records of the War of the Rebellion, v. 50, pt. 2 semi annual returns beginning December 1863.

== Posts in the District of California ==
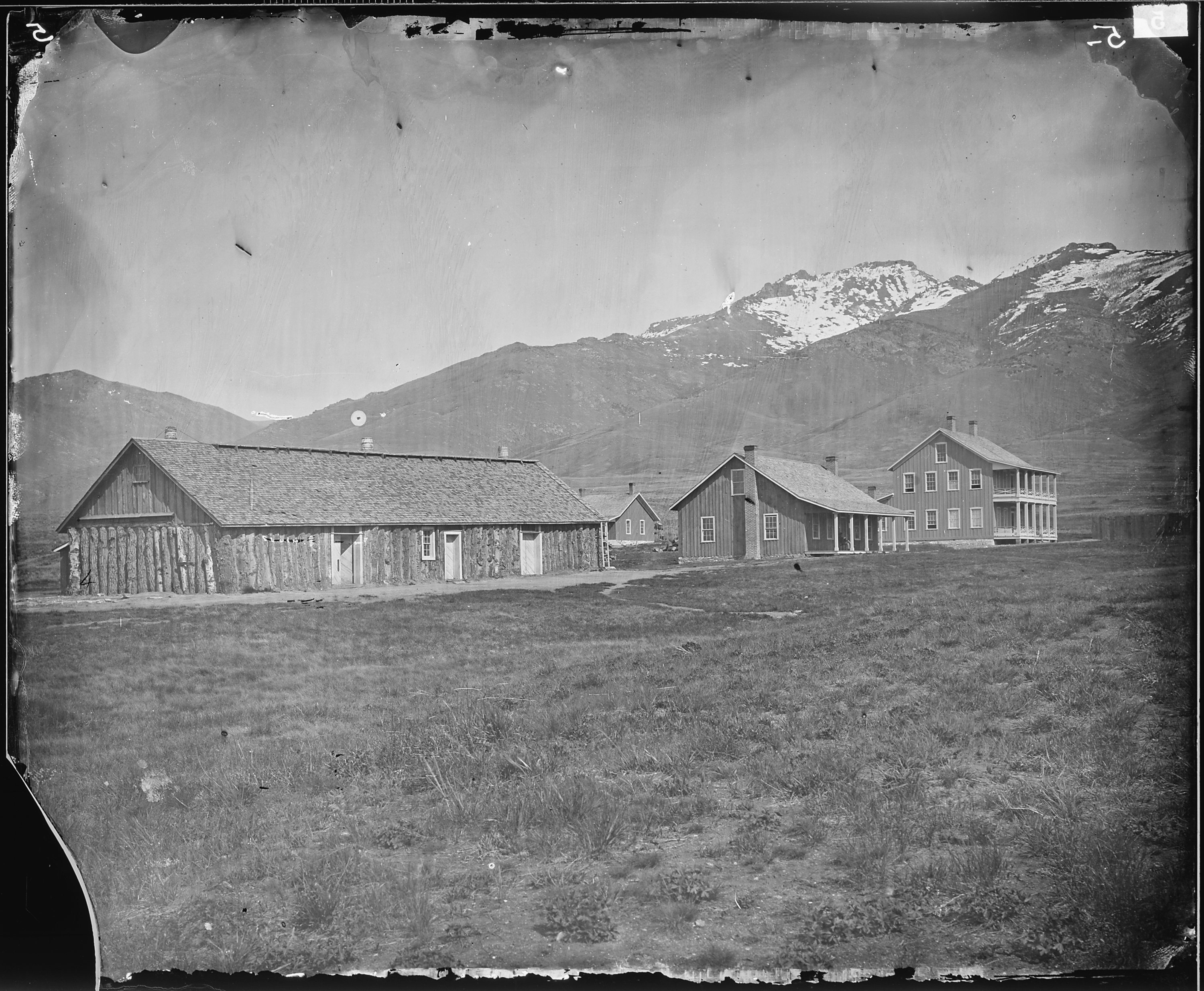
Camp Halleck in 1871

- Benicia Arsenal, 1851–1964
- Benicia Barracks, 1852–1866
- Fort Jones, 1852–1858, 1864
- Post of Alcatraz Island or Fort Alcatraz, 1853–1907
- Roop's Fort, Fort Defiance, Susanville 1853-1863
- Fort Point San José, San Francisco, 1853–1882
- Fort Point, San Francisco, 1853–1886
- Fort Crook 1857-1869
- Camp Allen, Oakland 1860-?
- Camp Cady, 20 miles east of Barstow 1860, 1862, 1864 - 1871
- Camp Dragoon Bridge, south of the town of Litchfield 1860-1863
- Camp Downey, Oakland, 1861
- Camp Halleck, Stockton, 1861-1863
- Camp Fitzgerald, Los Angeles June 1861 - September 20, 1861
- Fort on Pine Creek, Independence 1861-1865
- Camp San Bernardino, San Bernardino 1861
- Camp Lyon, San Francisco 1861-1865
- Mare Island Post, 1861–1862
- Camp McClellan, Auburn 1861
- Camp McDougall, near Stockton, 1861
  - Camp Gilmore, 1863
- Camp Union, Sutterville 1861-1866
- Camp Sigel, near Auburn, 1861–1862
- Camp Sumner, San Francisco, 1861-1865
- Camp Wright, San Francisco, 1861
- Camp Alert, San Francisco, 1862-1865
- Camp Hot Creek Station, 1862
- Camp Hooker, near Stockton, 1862
- Camp at Red Bluff, Red Bluff, 1862
- Camp Reynolds on Angel Island, 1863–1866
- Camp Bidwell, Chico, 1863–1865
  - Camp Chico, Chico, 1865
- Camp Merchant (originally Camp Merritt), 1863
- Fort Miller, 1863–1864.
- Camp Stanford, Stockton, 1863
- Camp Johns, 1864
- Camp Low, 1864-1865
- Camp Pollock 1864
- Camp Susan, Susanville 1864
- Federal Armory, Copperopolis 1864-1875
- Post at Friday's Station, 1864
- Colusa Post, 1864-1865
- Camp Bidwell 1865-1879 (Later Fort Bidwell)
- Camp near Hornitos, 18 miles northeast of Merced, 1865
- Camp Jackson, near Ione, 1865
- Monterey Barracks, 1865-1866
- Camp at Pierson's Ranch, 1865
- Camp Waite, 1865-1866

== Events, skirmishes, and battles ==
1861

- January 15, 1861. The Departments of California and Oregon merged into the Department of the Pacific. Col. Albert Sidney Johnston, 2nd US Cavalry, Brevet Brigadier General, U. S. Army, assumes command of the Department of the Pacific (including direct command of the District of California).
- March 23, 1861. Brigadier General Edwin V. Sumner, U. S. Army, assigned to command the Department of the Pacific.
- April 25, 1861. Brig. Gen. Edwin V. Sumner, U. S. Army, assumes command of tho Department of the Pacific, relieving Col. Albert Sidney Johnston, 2nd US Cavalry, brevet brigadier-general, U. S. Army.
- August 3–12, 1861. Scout from Fort Crook to Round Valley, California, with skirmish on the 6th in the Upper Pitt River Valley.
- August 15–22, 1861. Expedition from Fort Crook to tho Pitt River, California, with skirmish on the 19th near Kellogg's Lake, California.
- Sept. 7, 1861. Skirmish near the Santa Ana Canyon, California.
- Sept. 14, 1861. Col. George Wright, 9th US Infantry, assigned to command all troops serving in Southern California.
- Sept. 25, 1861. The District of Southern California created, comprising the counties of San Luis Obispo, Tulare, Santa Barbara, Los Angeles, San Bernardino, and San Diego, and Col. George Wright, assigned to its command.
- Oct. 11, 1861. Lieut. Col. Albemarle Cady, 7th US Infantry, assigned to command the District of Oregon.
- Oct. 20, 1861. Brig. Gen. Edwin V. Sumner, U. S. Army, relinquishes command of the Department of the Pacific to Col. George Wright.
- Oct. 26, 1861. Col. George Wright, assumes command of tho Department of the Pacific.
- Nov. 19, 1861. Brig. Gen. George Wright, U. S. Army, formally assigned to command the Department of the Pacific.
- Dec. 12, 1861. Humboldt Military District created to prosecute the Bald Hills War, to consist of the counties of Sonoma, Napa, Mendocino, Trinity, Humboldt, Klamath, and Del Norte, in Northern California, and Col. Francis J. Lippitt, Second California Infantry, assigned to its command.

1862

- Sept. 21, 1862. Affair on the Yreka Road, near Fort Crook, Cal.
- Nov. 3-29, 1862. Scouts from Fort Crook, Cal., and Fort Churchill, Nev. Ter., to Honey Lake Valley, Cal.

1863

1864

- July 1, 1864. Brig. Gen. George Wright, U. S. Army, retained command of the District of California but Maj. Gen. Irvin McDowell, U. S. Army, relieved him and assumed command of the Department of tho Pacific.

1865

- Apr. 5–18, 1865. Expedition from Camp Bidwell to Antelope Creek, Cal.
- June 27, 1865. Military Division of the Pacific created, to consist of the Departments of California and the Columbia. Department of California consisted of the States of California and Nevada and the Territories of New Mexico and Arizona. Maj. Gen. Irvin McDowell, U. S. Army, assigned to command the Department of California.

== See also ==
- California in the American Civil War
