= Fort Crook =

Fort Crook may refer to two U.S. military posts, both named after Gen. George Crook:

- Fort Crook (California) (1857–1869), near Fall River Mills, California
- Fort Crook, Nebraska (1891–1946), near Omaha, Nebraska, now Offutt Air Force Base
