= Henry Barrows =

Henry Barrows may refer to:

- Henry A. Barrows (1875–1945), American actor
- Henry Dwight Barrows (1825–1914), American teacher, businessman, farmer, goldminer, reporter

== See also ==
- Henry Barrowe (c. 1550–1593), English Puritan
