= Camp Downy =

Coordinates: 37°47′44″N 122°15′53″W

Camp Downey was an early training camp for California Volunteers, overlooking Lake Merritt, on what is now Seventh Avenue in Oakland, California.

Camp Downey was established on August 31, 1861, by Lieutenant Colonel Joseph R. West with the 1st Infantry, California Volunteers. After September 15, 1861, the camp was abandoned as the Volunteers took ship for Camp Latham in Southern California to suppress secessionists disturbances there.
