= Andrew Jackson King =

American lawyer

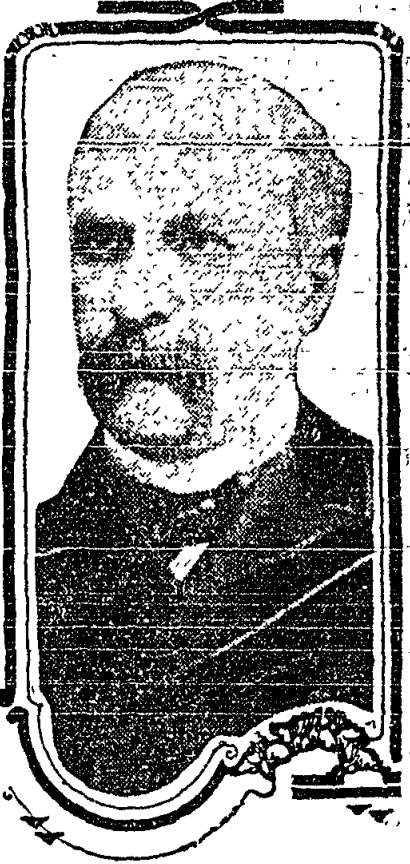
- Born: c. 1833; Union County, Georgia, U.S.
- Died: 1923 (aged 89–90); Los Angeles, California, U.S.
- Occupations: Lawyer, judge
- Spouse: Laura Cecelia Evertson
- Children: 4 sons, 4 daughters
- Parent(s): Samuel King; Martha Mee

Andrew Jackson King (c. 1833–1923), or A. J. King, was a lawman, lawyer, legislator and judge in 19th Century Los Angeles County, California.

== Personal ==
King was born in Cherokee Purchase Land in Union County, Georgia, the son of Samuel and Martha King. Later his father, Samuel King, who was a tanner and a saddler, took the family to Helena, Arkansas. In 1849 the family moved to Santa Fe, New Mexico Territory.

He traveled with his father and brothers Samuel Houston King and Francis King overland in 1852 with forty or fifty other pioneer families to El Monte, the oldest American settlement in Los Angeles County, along the San Gabriel River (now the Rio Hondo), which was inhabited by a mixture of emigrants, largely Texans. The King family laid out a town there that was called Lexington, the present site of El Monte, California.

King was married on December 31, 1862, to Laura C. Evertson of Los Angeles, she of French and Dutch ancestry. On October 14, 1923, King died at his home in Boyle Heights, 90 years old and the oldest member of the bar in Los Angeles. He was survived by his wife and three children, Frank E. King, Carroll E. King and Corrinne King.

== Vocation ==
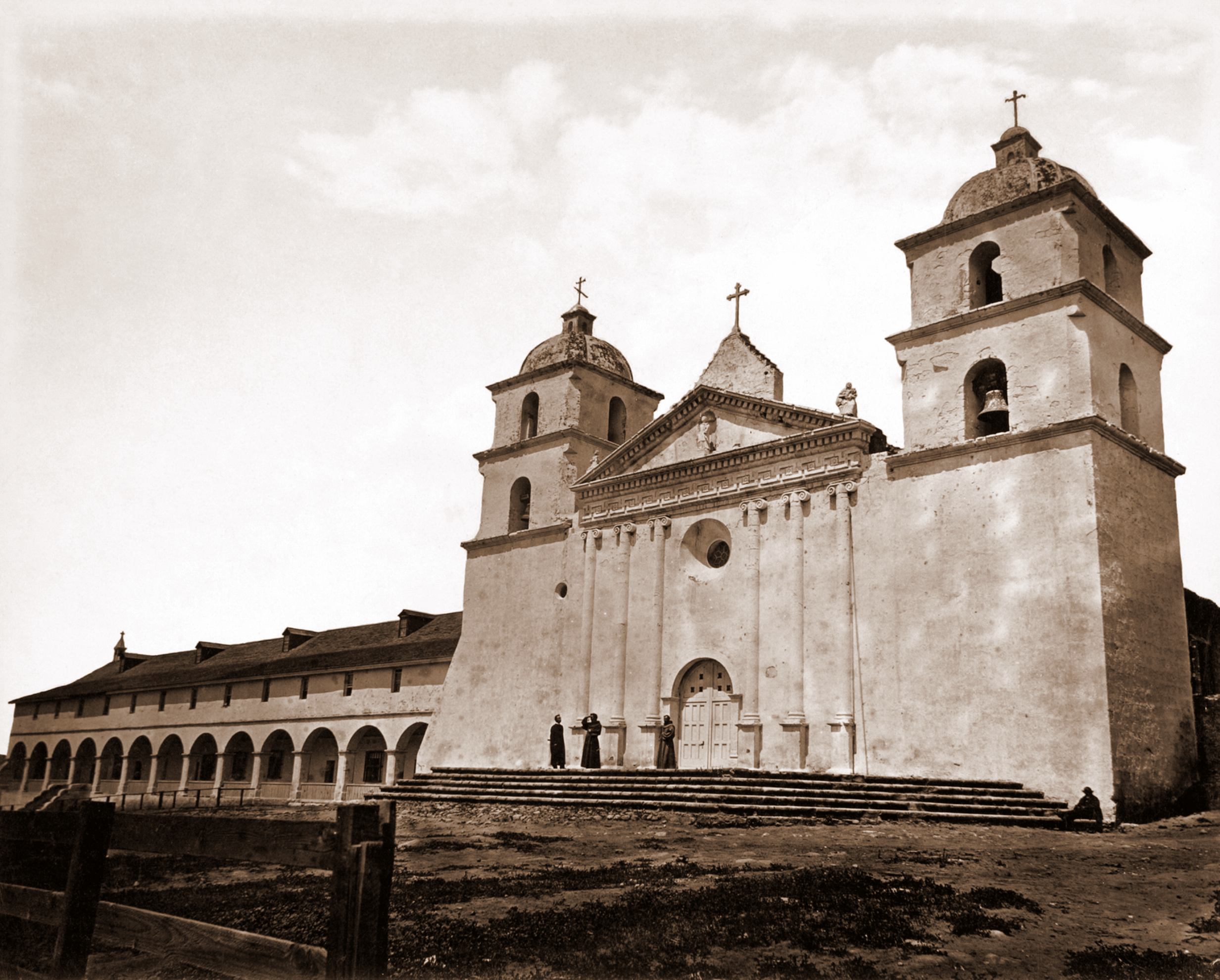
Santa Barbara Mission in 1876

King studied law in Los Angeles with Judge Benjamin Ignatius Hayes, the first district judge of the county. Then they and Judge Scott opened a law office on Main Street, a short distance south of the Los Angeles Plaza. King was also a judge, and he was praised by the Los Angeles Herald in December 1853 for putting an end to the practice by the city marshal of spending Sunday "in arresting and imprisoning Indians, supposed to be drunk, until Monday morning and discharged on paying a bill of two dollars and a half each, one dollar of which is the fee of the Marshal." King declared the practice to be unlawful. In 1855 he issued a ruling that Governor Pio Pico "had no authority by law to sell the personal property, Cattle, Horses, &c., of the Mission of Santa Barbara."

King became the first county clerk of San Bernardino County in 1853.

In March 1854, King was one of the members of the California Militia Company called the Monte Rangers, organized by John G. Downey and others. The unit operated against the Indian raiders and bandits who plagued Southern California like those driven out of San Francisco and the northern gold fields by vigilantes or local bandits like the Flores Daniel Gang.

King was elected a member of the California State Assembly in 1859 and was on the committee that located the site for the State Capitol. From 1861 to 1865 he was an undersheriff of Los Angeles County.

In 1865, King became a law partner of Judge Murray Morrison. From 1865 to 1870 he was also one of the proprietors and editors of the Los Angeles News. In 1866 and 1867 he was City Attorney and in 1869, County Judge. In 1873 he printed and published the first city directory. He was one of the founders of the County Agricultural Society in 1871. He was active in aiding and inaugurating many of the early municipal projects of the city of Los Angeles.

== U.S. Civil War ==
As early as 1856, A. J. King, as a Southerner, demonstrated his pro-slavery attitude when as the secretary of the Democracy of El Monte organization, signed his name to their resolution:

That we will cheerfully support the nominees for State and County officers [of the Democratic Party] at the next general election, and that we will use all honorable means to defeat our opponents, under whatever name they may assume, more especially those who style themselves Black Republicans.

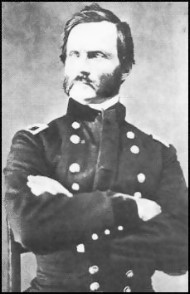
Carleton

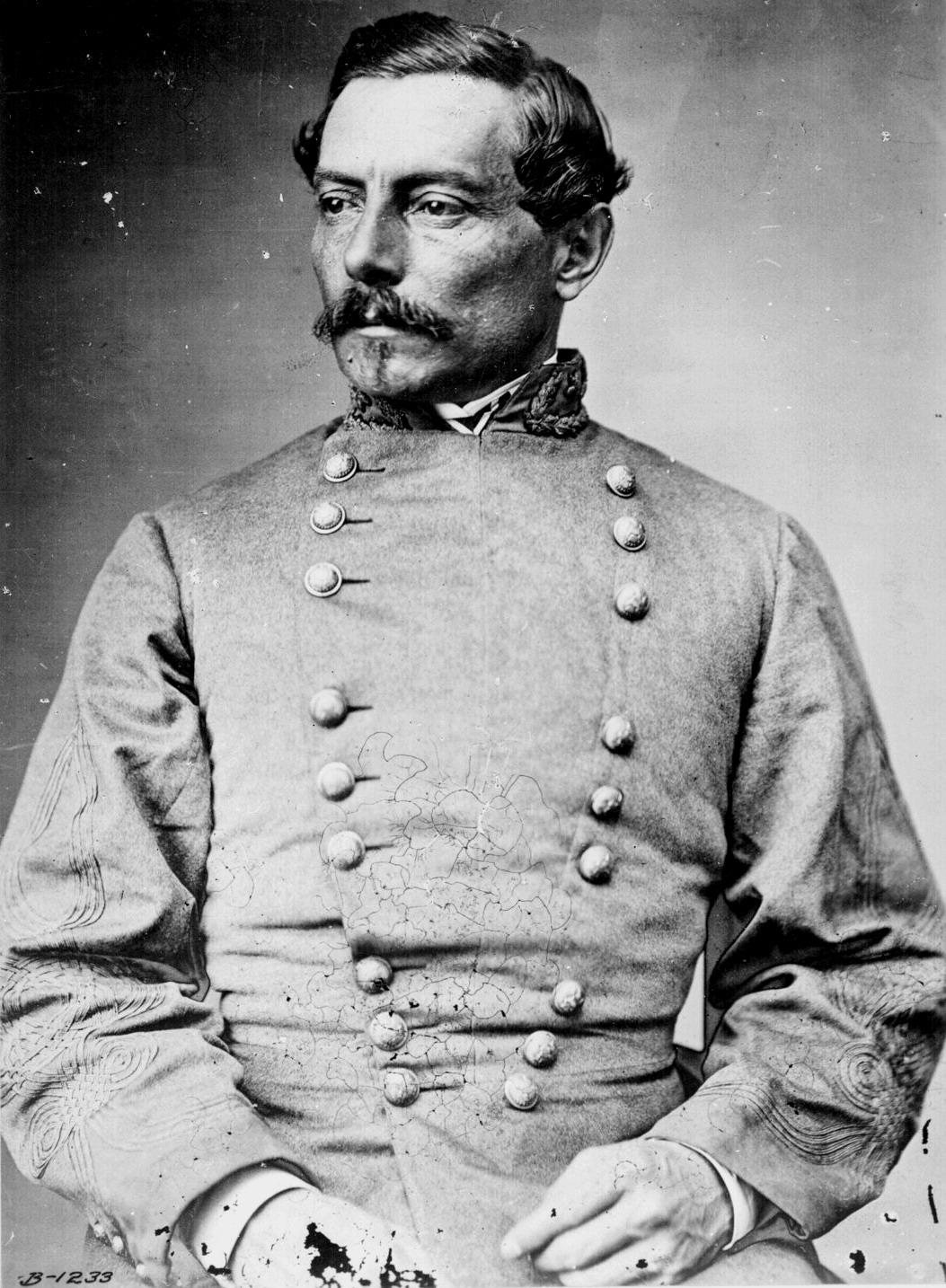
Beauregard

During the secession crisis of 1861, he tried to form another militia Company like the Los Angeles Mounted Rifles, the Monte Mounted Rifles, both units with secessionist sympathies. On April 26, 1861, the Monte Mounted Rifles asked Governor Downey for arms. But King ran afoul of Federal authorities. According to the Sacramento Union of April 30, 1861, King was brought before Colonel James Henry Carleton and was made to take an oath of allegiance to the Union and was then released. The governor sent the arms, but army officers at San Pedro held them up, preventing the activation of the Monte Mounted Rifles.

King did not flee eastward to the Confederacy with the Los Angeles Mounted Rifles but continued his secessionist activities. On April 10, 1862, as the United States Marshal for Southern California, Henry D. Barrows, wrote to the commander of the Department of the Pacific of the Union Army in San Francisco, complaining of anti-Union sentiment in Southern California. The letter said such sentiment "permeates society here among both the high and the low," and reported that:

A. J. King, under-sheriff of this county, who has been a bitter secessionist, who said to me that he owed no allegiance to the United States Government; that Jeff Davis was the only constitutional government we had, and that he remained here because he could do more harm to the enemies of that Government by staying here than going there; brought down on the Senator (a steam ship) Tuesday last a large lithograph gilt-framed portrait of Beauregard, the rebel general, which he flaunted before a large crowd at the hotel when he arrived. I induced Colonel Carleton to have him arrested as one of the many dangerous secessionists living in our midst, and to-day he was taken to Camp Drum. He was accompanied by General Volney E. Howard as counsel, and I have but little hope that he will be retained in custody.

King was released and remained in office as undersheriff until 1865.

== Bella Union Hotel shootout ==
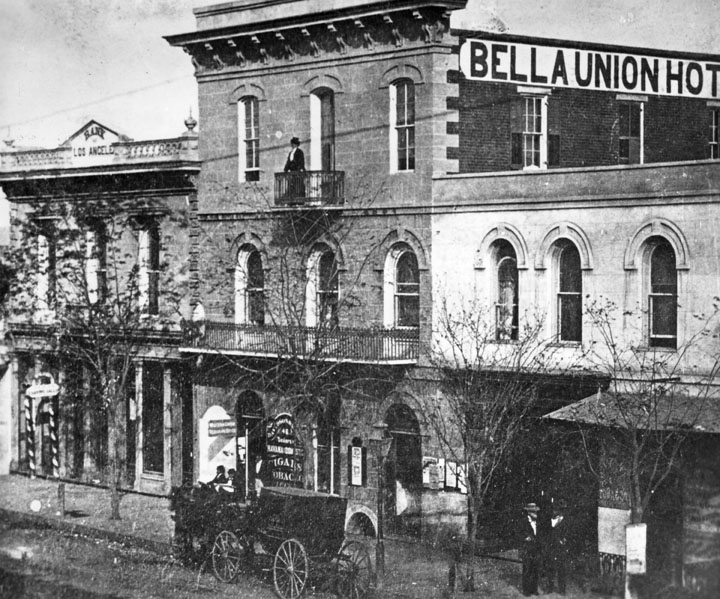
Bella Union Hotel

In 1865 there developed a conflict that came to be called the King-Carlisle feud. There are two stories of the origin of this feud, but the dispute festered between the friends and families of A.J. King and Robert Carlisle for some time. At a ball held in Los Angeles on July 5, 1865, Carlisle attacked A.J. King, and friends separated the men, with King suffering "a gash over the heart and a wound in his right hand." The next day, King's brothers, Frank and Houston, had a shootout with Carlisle inside the saloon of the Bella Union Hotel (owned by John King, another King brother); it resulted in the death of both Frank King and Carlisle. Houston King was charged with the murder of Carlisle, and A.J. King was released from his duties as undersheriff to assist in his brother's legal defense: Houston was acquitted.
