= Ferris Foreman =

American politician

Engraving of Foreman published 1858

Ferris Foreman (August 24, 1808 – February 11, 1901) was an American lawyer, politician, and soldier. He fought in the Mexican–American War, and was a colonel commanding a volunteer regiment and the District of Southern California during the American Civil War. He was a presidential elector for Illinois in the 1848 elections.

== Early life ==
Born in Nichols, Tioga County, New York. In 1836, he was practicing law in Utica, New York. However the next year he was a clerk of the Illinois House of Representatives in Vandalia, Illinois.

He secured an appointment as U.S. Attorney for Illinois, from 1839 to 1841. In 1839, Ferris Foreman prosecuted the case of U.S. v. Gratiot, in a case arising under a lease, by the government of a portion of the lead mines of Galena.

On January 11, 1844, Foreman was married, to Lucinda Boothe (died 1880) and they had one daughter, Ann, and a son, Sands William. He was a Democrat member of the Illinois Senate from 1845 to 1846.

== Mexican War ==
During the Mexican–American War he raised a company of volunteers in Vandalia, Fayette County, Illinois, and was appointed colonel commanding the 3rd Regiment of Illinois Volunteers. It was composed of ten companies and served in the war from July 1846 to May 1847.

His 3rd Regiment with Colonel Foreman in command was attached to the Army of Invasion of General Winfield Scott, and played a part in the siege of Veracruz, and in the march on Mexico City, Col Foreman's 3d Ill fought under General Shields at the battle of Cerro Gordo the 3d and 4th Ill "carried a battery of the enemy's on his extreme left (Santa Anna's), gain the national road and cut off his retreat route" (History of Illinois, Illinois in the Mexican War). For this action he was awarded a cased sword by the State of Illinois. Colonel Foreman was especially commended in the report by General Scott.

== 49er ==
After returning from Mexico, Foreman was a presidential elector for Illinois in 1848. In 1849, he went to California during the 1849 California Gold Rush.

Soon after he arrived he assisted in the relief of emigrants coming overland, taking command of one of the relief columns sent by the Territorial government over the Sierra passes. He later became a Postmaster and for a short time in the summer of 1850 was a Sacramento County Judge.

He became involved in business and in 1853 was elected to the board of the Alta California Telegraph Company. He became involved in California politics and from 1859 to 1860 he was Secretary of State of California, during the administration of Governor John B. Weller.

== Civil War ==
Following the beginning of the Civil War, he joined the 4th Regiment of California Infantry as lieutenant Colonel but became colonel commanding the 4th Regiment from November, 1861 succeeding Colonel Henry M. Judah in command of the regiment. His regimental headquarters and several companies were sent from San Francisco to Camp Latham in Southern California in late 1861.

On May 2, 1862, General George Wright wrote to Colonel Ferris Foreman, the new commander of Camp Latham to send, two or three companies of the Second Cavalry with Lieutenant Colonel George S. Evans as commander to establish a post in the Owens Valley. He was Commander of the District of Southern California from May 15, 1862, to May 17, 1862, and from April 10, 1863, to July 7, 1863. Colonel Foreman commanded the 4th Regiment until August 20, 1863, when he resigned.

Shortly afterward, Foreman's daughter Ann was discovered to have been in communication with the infamous secessionist and duelist Daniel Showalter who wrote her an affectionate letter that was found on the body of a Confederate spy in west Texas in September 1863.

== Later life ==
With the Republicans dominating California politics, Foreman returned to Illinois and became the Fayette County State's Attorney and was a delegate to the Illinois state constitutional convention for the 13th District in 1870. He returned to California in his later years, and died in Stockton, San Joaquin County, February 11, 1901. He was buried at San Joaquin Catholic Cemetery, in Stockton.

Political offices
Preceded by David F. Douglass	Secretary of State of California; 1858–1860	Succeeded by Johnson Price
