= California State Military Museum =

Coordinates: 38°34′53″N 121°30′17″W

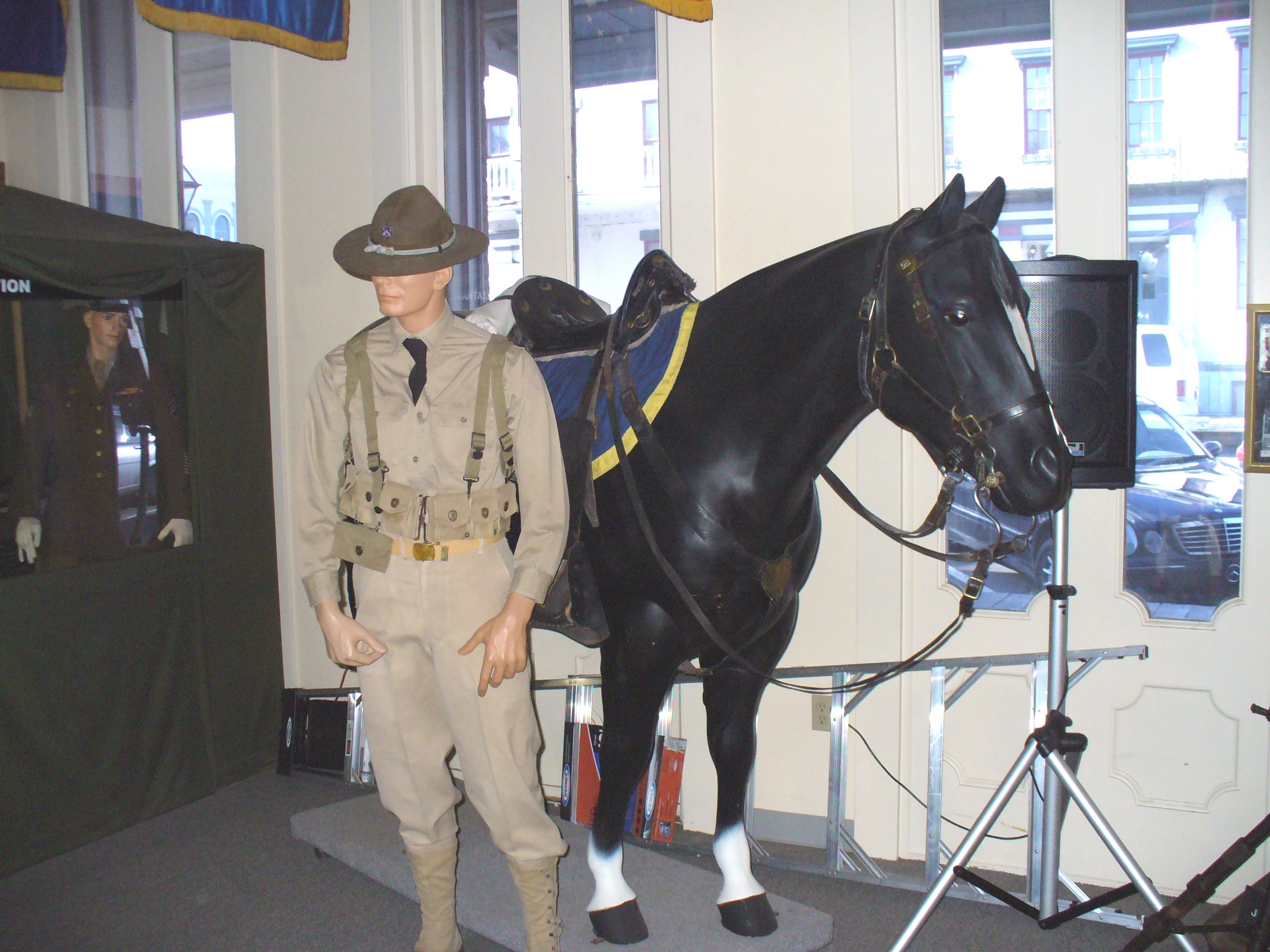
- Cavalry display
- Established: 1991
- Location: Sacramento, California
- Type: Military museum
- Director: Sgt Maj Dan Sebby
- Curator: Sgt Maj Dan Sebby
- Owner: California Military Department
- Website: http://www.militarymuseum.org/

The California State Military Museum was the official military museum of the State of California. It was located in the Old Sacramento State Historic Park at 1119 Second Street. A new site is under development.

The museum begun in 1991, during the administration of California governor Pete Wilson. Eleven years later, Governor Gray Davis made it a permanent museum under the California State Military Department, providing it permanent funding. On 13 July 2004, Governor Arnold Schwarzenegger made it the State's official Military Museum.

The museum highlights contributions of individuals and units from California in the US military, and its various military operations and wars. The museum in 2011, through a collaborated effort with the California Department of Veteran Affairs and the United States Department of Veterans Affairs, represented by guest curator Natalia Visante, created themed exhibitions showcasing various military units.

In addition to its main location in Sacramento, the museum has five satellite museums located at Camp Roberts in southern Monterey County, Camp San Luis Obispo, Fresno Air National Guard Base, the Los Alamitos Joint Forces Training Base in Orange County, and the National Guard Armory in San Diego.

To honor Californians who have laid down their lives in the global war on terrorism, the California State Military Museum built a "Global War on Terrorism Wall of Honor". Constructed of black granite, this memorial is located in the entrance of the museum. The names of the service members who died on September 11, 2001, in the attack on the Pentagon, as well as casualties of the Afghanistan and Iraq Campaigns are listed chronologically. The memorial includes their rank, branch of service, and age. Currently, the annual wreath-laying ceremony has ended, due to the museum's closure.

The Major General Walter P. Story Memorial Library is one of the finest collections of military history writings in the western United States. With over 10,000 volumes and growing rapidly, the library is one of the state's hidden educational and historical treasures. Topics range from general military history to very specific and one-of-a-kind documents, such as original unit rosters of early California Militia units.

As of March 2014, the California State Military Museum was closed amid disputes between the non-profit foundation operating it and the California Military Department, which oversees its operation. This conflict, in addition to state of California budget constraints, forced indefinite closure of the museum.

== See also ==
- California in the American Civil War
