= New Camp Carleton =

New Camp Carleton was a Union Army garrison of the District of Southern California during the American Civil War. It was established on March 22, 1862, near El Monte, California. It was located "on the right bank of the San Gabriel River, four miles north east from El Monte, the nearest post office, and which is distant thirteen miles from Los Angeles." The garrison was transferred there from San Bernardino because it was in a better location to supply the camp, and also to oversee the area which was a hotbed of secessionist sympathizers. The camp was closed in 1865.

== See also ==
- California in the Civil War
