= Harvey Lee =

Harvey Lee (1819–1866) was a lawyer, politician, judge and soldier. He was captain of a company of Illinois Volunteers in the Mexican–American War and lieutenant colonel of California Volunteers in the American Civil War.

During the Mexican–American War Harvey Lee from Fayette County, Illinois, was a captain of a company from Alton, Illinois, in the 2nd Illinois Volunteers; for the war with Mexico from August 1847 until the regiment disbanded July 1848. His unit saw no fighting but was part of the garrison of Tampico.

Lee came to California after the Mexican War, and practiced as a lawyer in Benicia, California. On September 13, 1853, he was married to Mary Ferguson, of Benicia. In 1858 he was elected a member of California State Assembly, for the 18th District in Amador County. He was then appointed as recorder of the California Supreme Court in 1858–59 by the Assembly, unlike all previous recorders who had been appointed by the court.

The court was not happy with this new arrangement. Justice Stephen Johnson Field later commented that Lee's work was so defective that the judges sought to have the new law repealed and the appointing authority returned to the court. As a result of this dispute, Lee held bitter feelings toward the judges that he vented during a conversation with the clerk of the court, a Mr. Fairfax. An altercation ensued in which Lee drew his sword cane, and ran it into Fairfax's body twice, inflicting a serious wound in the chest just above the heart. Fairfax drew his pistol in self-defense as Lee raised his sword for a third thrust but, let the pistol drop, restrained by the thought of Lee's wife and children.

During the American Civil War he was given a commission as a Lt. Colonel of 4th Infantry California Volunteers in 1861. He first served at Benicia, and then at San Pedro at Camp Drum. He later became Commander of the District of Southern California, from February 7, 1863, to April 10, 1863. Sent in March 1863 to Fort Yuma, Lieutenant Colonel Harvey Lee, either signed as a witness or authenticated the copy of an April 9, 1863, peace and mutual defense treaty between the Indian tribes along the Colorado river and in western Arizona. Lee's junior officers believed that their commander slipped in and out of insanity. He was relieved of command of Fort Yuma on April 20, 1863, and was ordered to report to Headquarters in San Francisco and resigned from the Army thereafter.

Elected again a Member of the California state assembly, in 1865 for the 14th District. He served in the assembly until 1866, when he was appointed District Judge of the 16th Judicial District. He held that office only a short while until his death on August 19, 1866, at the age of 47, in a horse and buggy accident.
