= Roderick N. Matheson =

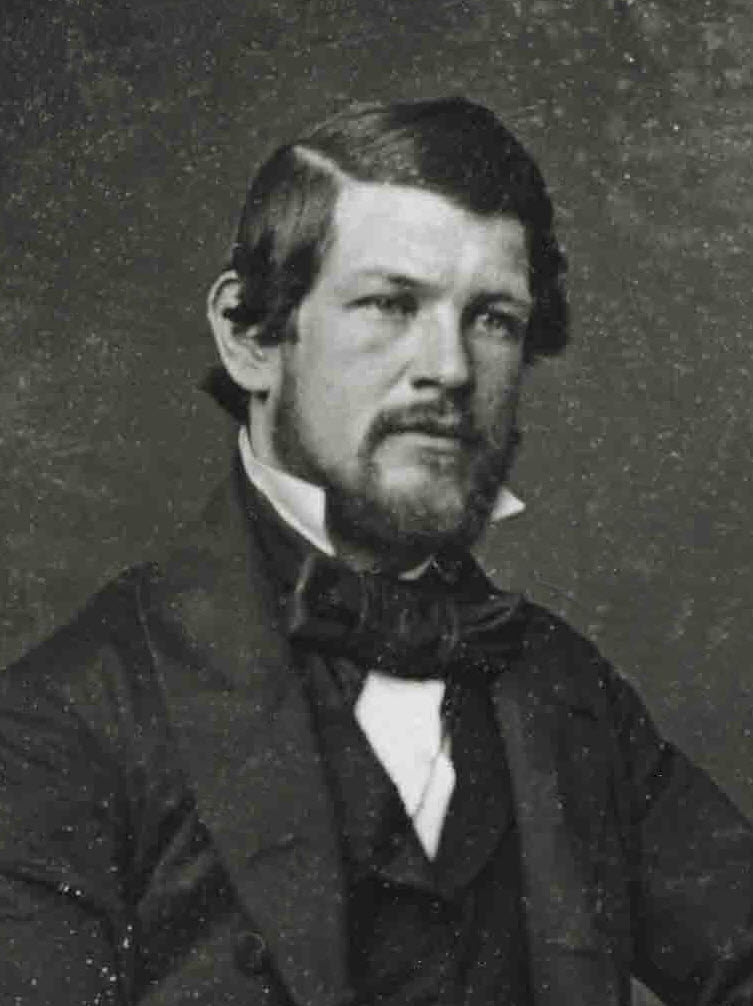
- Colonel Roderick N. Matheson, c. 1861
- Born: May 28, 1824; Inverness, Scotland
- Died: September 14, 1862 (aged 38); Crampton's Gap, Maryland, U.S.
- Military career
- Allegiance: Union
- Branch: United States Army
- Service years: 1861–1862
- Rank: Colonel
- Commands: 32nd New York Volunteer Infantry Regiment
- Conflicts: American Civil War

Roderick Nicol Matheson (May 28, 1824 – September 14, 1862) was a colonel in the Union Army during the American Civil War and the commander of the 32nd New York Volunteer Infantry Regiment. He was killed at Crampton's Gap during the Maryland Campaign of 1862.

== Biography ==
Matheson was born in Inverness, Scotland, in 1824. At the age of 15, he emigrated with his parents to New York City. He later moved to California during the Gold Rush and settled in Healdsburg, California in 1856. There, he became a well-known landowner and benefactor.

In 1861, Matheson traveled to Washington, D.C. to witness the first inauguration of Abraham Lincoln. Though intending to stay briefly, he became caught up in the events surrounding the start of the Civil War. He went on to organize and lead the 32nd New York Infantry, sometimes referred to as the "1st California Regiment."

Matheson fought in several major battles, including:

- First Battle of Bull Run
- Peninsula Campaign
- Seven Days Battles

He was mortally wounded at Crampton's Gap during the Battle of South Mountain on September 14, 1862.

A major street in Healdsburg is named in his honor.
