= Territory of Colorado (California) =

Proposed U.S. Territory encompassing southern California counties

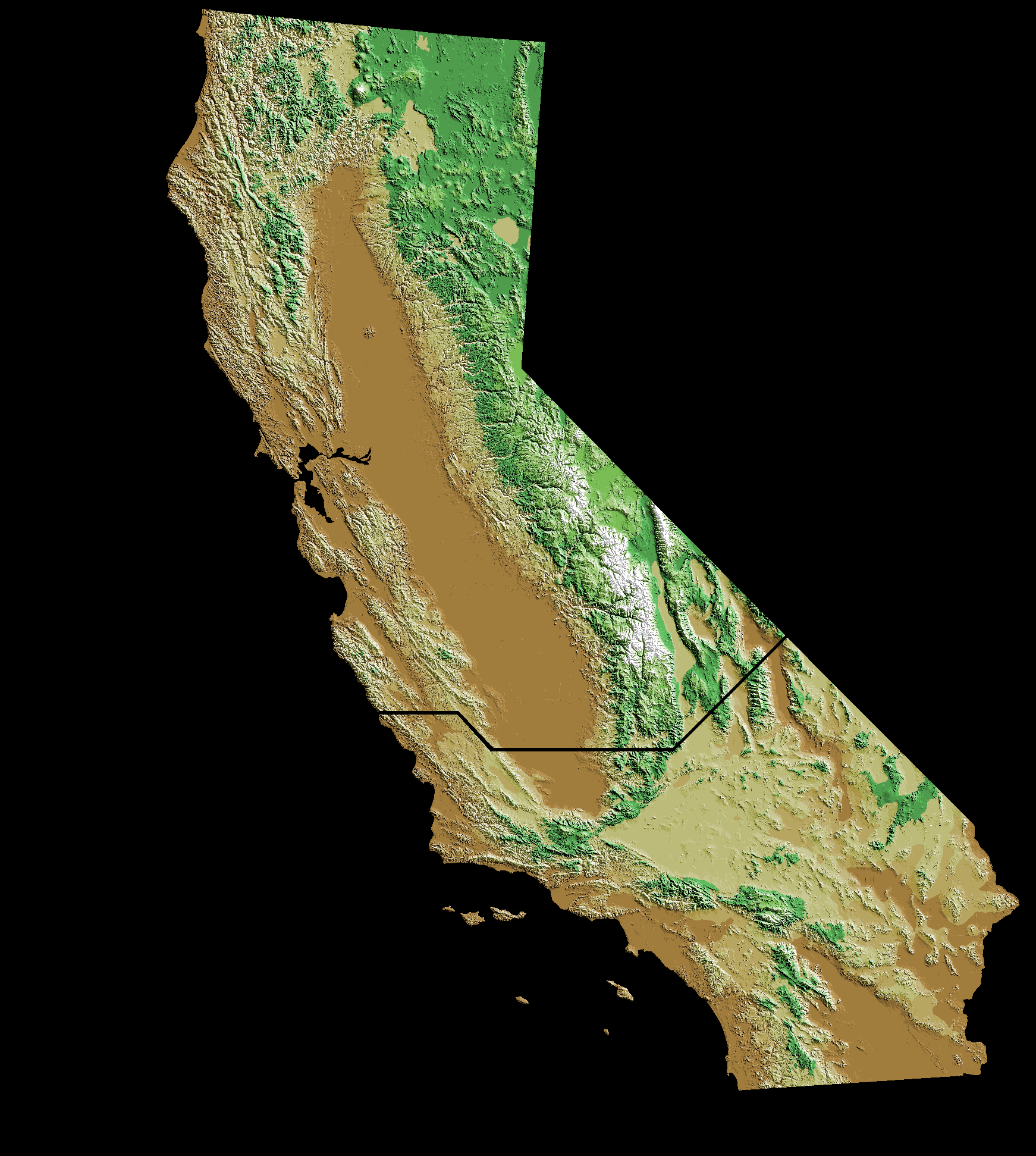
The Pico Act of 1859 proposed to divide California

Territory of Colorado (California) was an 1859–60 attempt by Californios to separate the southern counties of California into a separate Territory of the United States.

== Pico Act of 1859 ==
Spanish-speaking Californios, dissatisfied with inequitable taxes and land laws in the lightly populated "Cow Counties" of the southern part of California, attempted three times in the 1850s to achieve a separate statehood or territorial status separate from Northern California. In early 1859, a resolution introduced by Andrés Pico was submitted to the California Assembly. This last attempt, the Pico Act of 1859, was passed by the California State Legislature, and signed by the State governor John B. Weller. It was approved overwhelmingly by nearly 75% of voters in the proposed Territory of Colorado. The act aimed to cut through the county of Tulare which was much larger at the time, to create a boundary line starting at the northwest corner of San Luis Obispo County, continuing eastward until it bent around the Central Valley, then cutting northeast to Nevada. The proposed border was described as follows:

...a line drawn eastward from the west boundary of the state along the sixth standard parallel south of the Mount Diablo meridian, east to the summit of the coast range; thence southerly following said summit to the seventh standard parallel; thence due east on said standard parallel to its intersection with the northwest border of Los Angeles county; thence northeast along said boundary to the eastern border of the state.

The proposal was sent to Washington, D.C., with a strong advocate in Governor Milton Latham, who continued to shepherd the document after he resigned the governorship to become a US senator. However the secession crisis following the election of Abraham Lincoln in 1860 led to the proposal never coming to a vote.

As drawn, this border was observed in 1907 by attorney Grant Jackson to contain a fatal flaw: it would have cut off from Angelenos the potentially valuable water supply from the Owens River in the Owens Valley, leaving it in the hands of northern Californians. This would have threatened the viability of the Los Angeles Aqueduct water project then underway.

=== Results ===
Pico Act of 1859
Choice	Votes	%
For	2,447	74.72
Against	828	25.28
Total	3,275	100.00
