= Camp Latham =

U.S. Army site in California (1861–1862)

Camp Latham
- La Ballona Township, Los Angeles County, California in United States
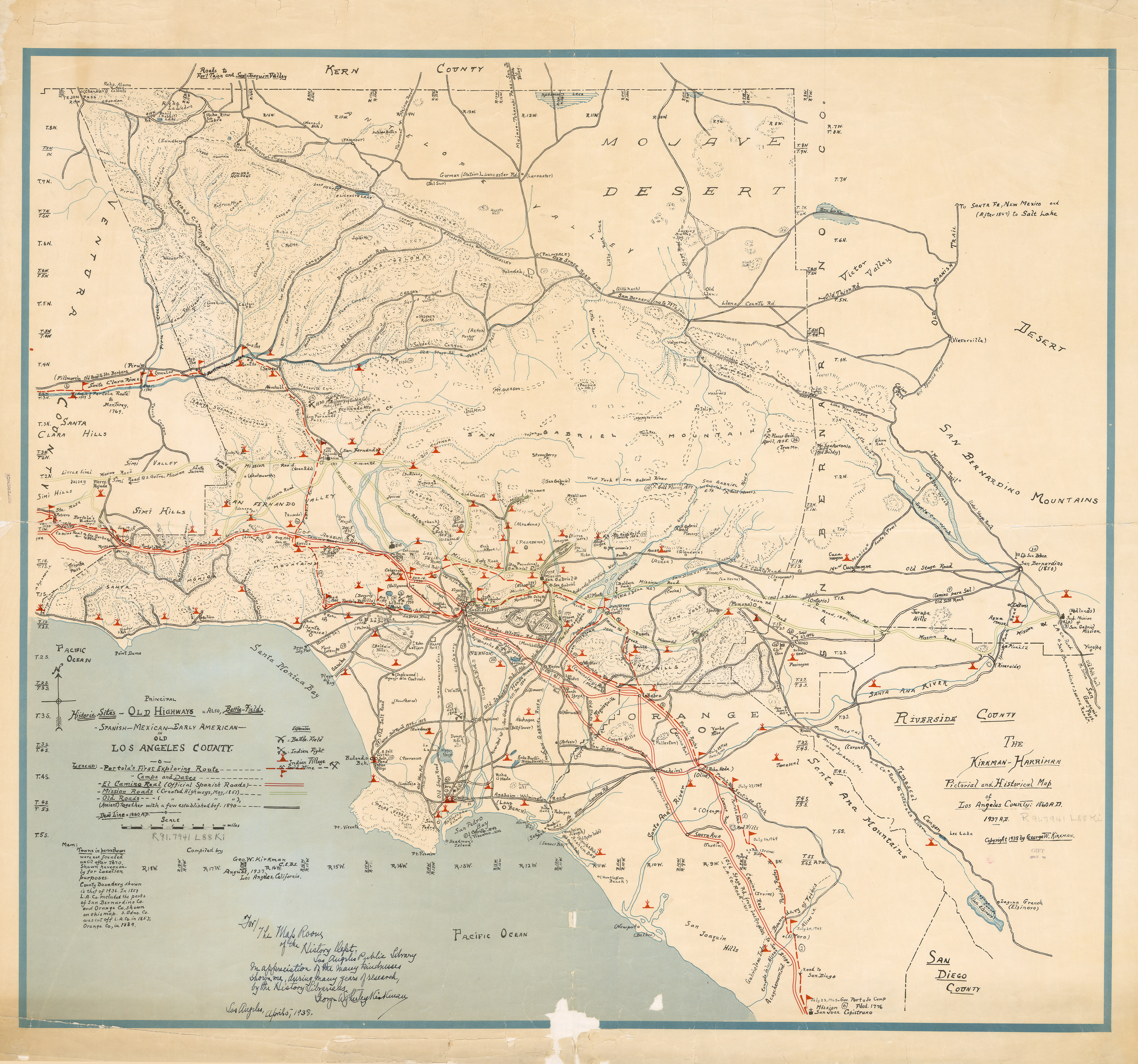
- George W. Kirkman's hand-drawn 1938 Pictorial and Historical Map of Old Los Angeles County, depicting the region through 1860

Site information
- Owner: United States Army

Location
- Coordinates: 34.0060°N 118.3950°W

Site history
- Built: 1861
- In use: 1862
- Fate: Closed, troops relocated to Camp Drum

Camp Latham was a temporary United States Army tent camp located in Los Angeles County, California extant from the fall of 1861 to fall of 1862 in the military District of Southern California during the American Civil War. Camp Latham was located on the south bank of Ballona Creek, approximately .75 mi (1.21 km) southwest of what is now called Culver City station. Short-lived Camp Kellogg was located nearby, just north across the creek.

== Background ==
While located well outside of the disputed battleground of the American Civil War, the Union still saw fit to station active-duty troops in the west, to discourage Confederate tendencies among the populace, protect supply and communications routes, and for intercessions with Native Americans. Los Angeles was a small town in 1860, with an estimated population of perhaps 4,400 people, but it was centrally situated along extant roads, such as the Gila Trail and the Old Spanish Trail, and had a functioning harbor at San Pedro that had been established for shipping the tallow and hides produced by the region's vast cattle ranches. So, when hostilities broke out back east—and pro-Confederate units such the Los Angeles Greys and the Los Angeles Mounted Rifles began mustering locally—U.S. Army posts were established in the remote, but not entirely inessential, area of coastal southern California. As the newsletter of the Drum Barracks historical society put it:

Demonstrations in Los Angeles and other Southern California towns had shown that much of the local population, perhaps a majority, were Southern sympathizers, and a "secession company" was even holding public drills, deliberately displaying the Bear Flag instead of the Stars and Stripes. The military units ordered to the Los Angeles post were encamped first close to town at a site called Camp Fitzgerald after a recently deceased Ft. Tejon officer, then moved to the new Camp Latham, located eight miles southwest, where Culver City is today.

Additionally, a word about the weather in the West at the beginning of the Civil War era may be helpful in setting the scene at Camp Latham. Per a history of Los Angeles written nearly 50 years later, "January 1862 was noted for the greatest flood in the history of California. It began raining December 24, 1861, and kept it up almost without cessation for a month." As more recent scholarship put it: the winter of 1861–1862 was "the wettest and coldest winter on the West Coast in the last three centuries." Animals and people drowned by the dozens, rivers washed away roads and bridges (cutting off supply and mail routes between Camp Latham, Los Angeles, and Fort Tejon), and as the waterways, marshes and ciénegas of the Los Angeles Basin overspilled their banks, everything that was not washed downriver was mired in mud.

== History ==
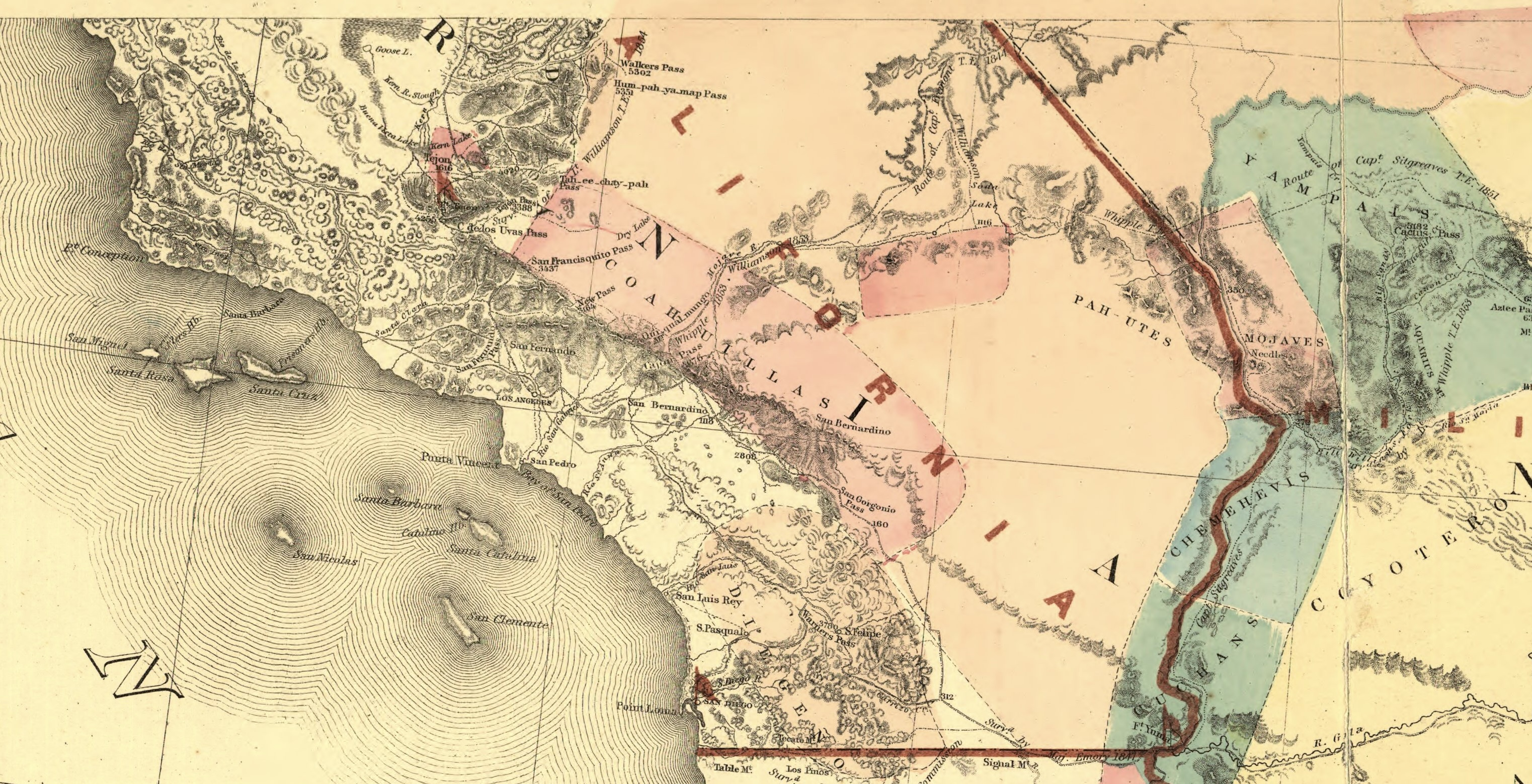
Southern half of the Military Department of California, c. 1858

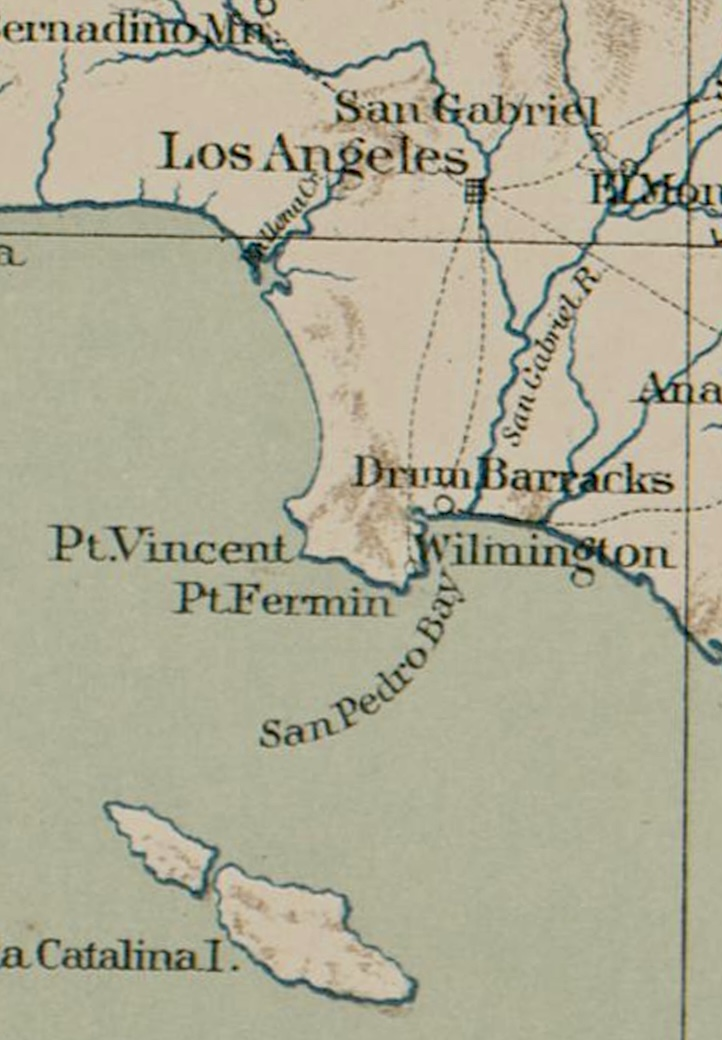
Southern California in the Atlas of the War of the Rebellion indicating locations of Ballona Creek, Los Angeles, and Drum Barracks, along with route northwest to Fort Tejon and routes between town and harbor, et al. (map drawn 1867, atlas published 1895)

Camp Latham was established by the 1st California Infantry under Col. James H. Carleton and the 1st California Cavalry under Lt. Col. Benjamin F. Davis. It was named for U.S. Senator Milton S. Latham, and Camp Kellogg, which may have been extant for no more than a month, was named for John Kellogg, who organized the 5th California Infantry Regiment. Camp Latham may have been first established when Company A of the First Infantry arrived at the site on September 22, 1861.

By October 2, the local pro-Union newspaper Semi-Weekly Southern News reported that "three lines of stages now run regularly between the city and Camp Latham." On October 19, 1861 the Nevada Democrat newspaper reported, "Camp Latham is the name given to the encampment of volunteers near Los Angeles, where there are now stationed 769 infantry and 454 cavalry, making 1,223 troops in all." Companies D, G, I of the 2nd California Volunteers and companies F, G, and H of the 4th California Volunteers were among those units stationed at Camp Latham.

Camp Kellogg was seemingly founded February 4, 1862 with the contents of 26 wagons and the soldiers of companies C, E, F, G, and I of the Fifth Regiment, arrived from San Pedro. A Fifth Regiment correspondent reported: "Camp Kellogg will be short lived, I think, as Camp Latham will soon be vacated by the First Regiment and we will take their place; they have a fine place, neatly arranged, and a clear, graveled parade ground. Only a portion of the regiment is there now, being companies K and C, First Infantry, and company C and a part of B, First Cavalry, who are without horses." As of March 1862, per the Daily Alta California, "At Camp Latham there are three companies of cavalry and two of infantry. In Camp Kellogg, adjoining Camp Latham, there are six companies." The Alta California also reported that the rains had turned Ballona from a rill to a river, seemingly swamping Camp Kellogg, resulting in its closure.

Also in March 1862 an intoxicated soldier named George McDermott stabbed to death a local man named Guadalupe Moreno, at "a low liquor shanty operated by a Mexican" that was located just outside the perimeter of Camp Latham. Per the Weekly Butte Record, "The murderer was sent to town under a guard of soldiers, and placed in jail. He attempted to escape after committing the deed. He is said to be only twenty years of age, and until this time was never known to drink, and had always borne a good character. A bill has been found against him for murder by the Grand Jury." In April 1862 McDermott was sentenced to 10 years "in the penitentiary" by the Los Angeles District Court.

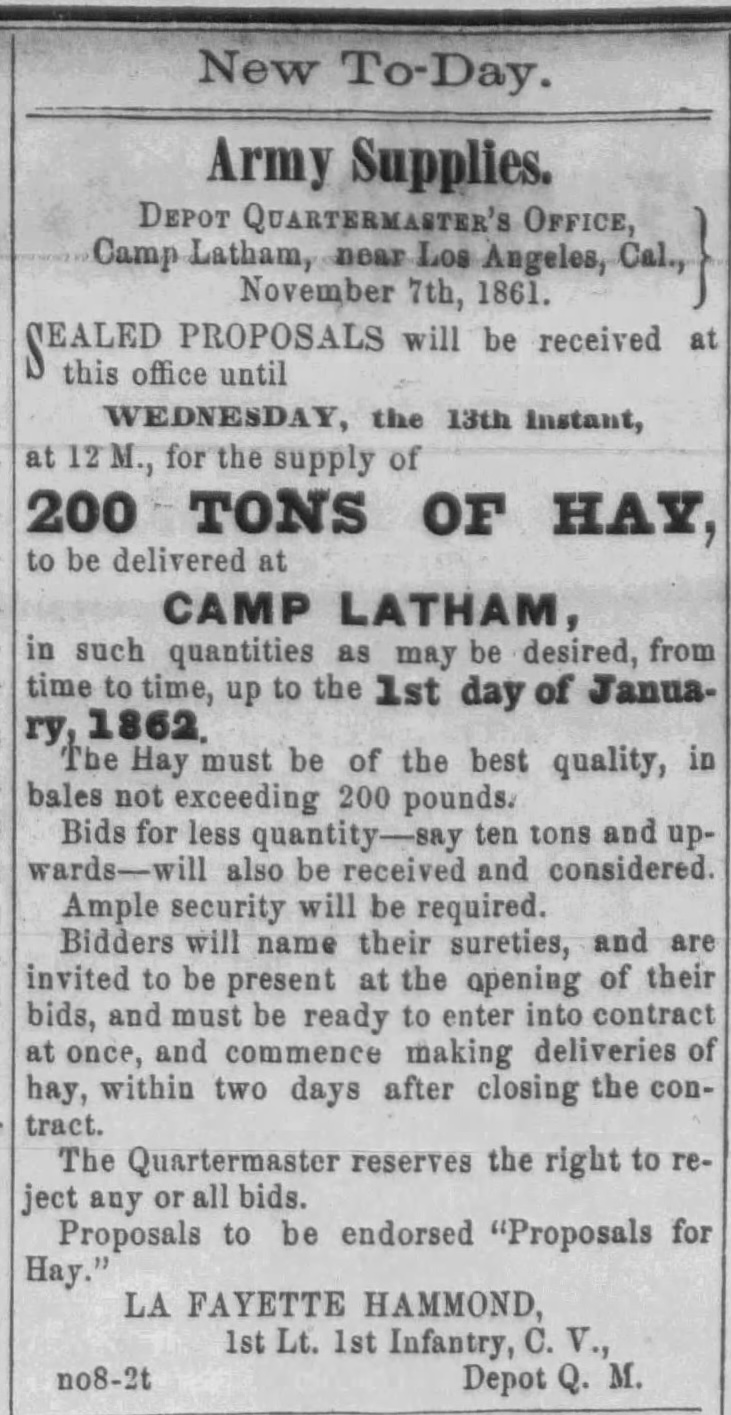
"200 tons of hay to be delivered at Camp Latham": Ballona Creek provided ample water, but the cavalry horses still needed forage

An expedition to the Owens River led by George S. Evans from Camp Latham resulted in the establishment of Camp Independence. Camp Independence was the base of the U.S. Army during the Owens Valley Indian War. The California Column also departed from Camp Latham. Approximately 36 camels from the U.S. Camel Corps were temporarily relocated to Camp Latham when Fort Tejon briefly closed.

Los Angeles is a rebel hole. If San Joaquin was the South Carolina of California, Los Angeles is its Mississippi. Yet there was a celebration there on the Fourth.

— Sacramento Bee, Tuesday, July 15, 1862, page 4

On the Fourth of July 1862, there was a "dress parade and grand review" before Col. Ferris Foreman, George Washington's Farewell Address and the Declaration of Independence were read aloud, there was a 100-gun salute to the Union, and finally soldiers from Camp Latham and their guests "visited the Willows, a beautiful grove on the right bank of Ballona Creek, for a promenade to enchanting music." (Note: Per Goldman (1965), "In 1863 and 1864, Independence Day was not celebrated openly in Los Angeles. Those who expressed loyalty to the Union cause were forced to travel the twenty-odd miles to Fort Drum in Wilmington or to Camp Latham south of Santa Monica.") Guests from town included John Frohling, Pedro Sainsevain, John Leonce Hoover, and William Wolfskill. The University of Iowa Library holds the 1862 diary of an unknown soldier stationed at Camp Latham who was assigned in August 1862 to escort a "specie train" to New Mexico Territory. In September 1862, the U.S. military residents of the camp were accused of voting fraud and intimidation of election officials, "wherein the military took possession of the ballot box, and placed therein about 200 illegal votes for county and township officers—being the votes of soldiers in the service of the United States, who are not citizens of this county." The election officers reported their concerns about the conduct of the soldiers to the county. As James Miller Guinn told it in 1915: "The soldiers at Camp Latham at the September election took possession of the polls and cast over 200 votes for the Union candidates for the legislature, defeating the Confederate sympathizers on the Democratic ticket. A great outcry was raised by the defeated candidates over the outrage and the vote of the precinct was thrown out."

In early October 1862 several newspapers reported that "The troops stationed at Camp Latham have been removed to San Pedro for Winter quarters. Two companies of cavalry, under Colonel Evans, now at Owens river, are to be stationed at Visalia [Camp Babbitt]." The troops never returned to Camp Latham, and the San Pedro post, then called Camp Drum, later became the still-extant Drum Barracks.

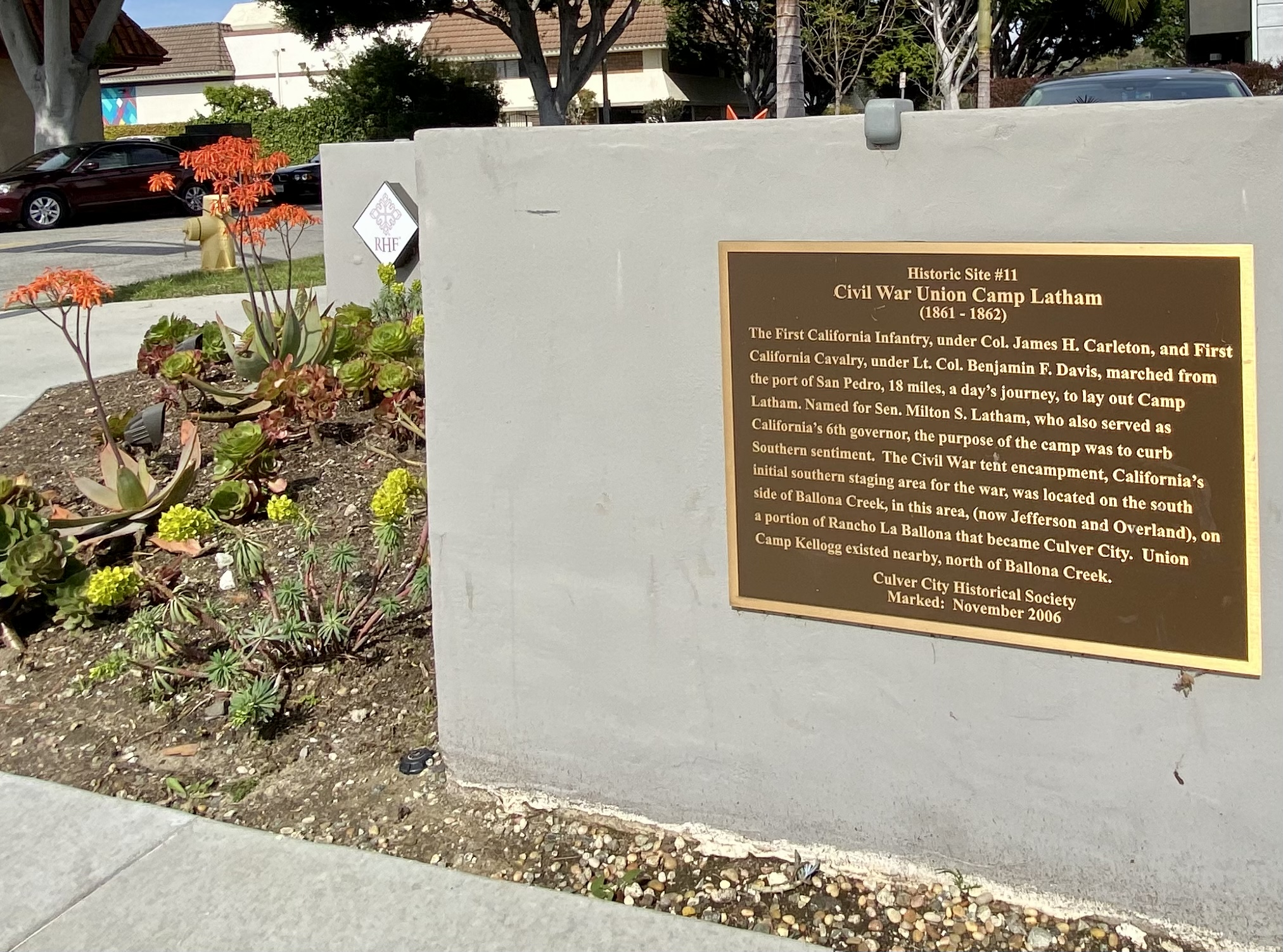
Camp Latham marker, Rotary Plaza, Culver City

No trace remains today of Camp Latham but for many years there stood "the ruins of an old brick oven" built just outside the camp to provide bread for the soldiers. The oven was a relic of Louis Mesmer's bakery operation on the site, built when the Alsatian immigrant won the contract to supply Camp Latham with bread. Louis Mesmer later purchased large parts of Rancho La Ballona, and was involved in the failed attempt to create a Port Ballona harbor. Mesmer's son and heir Joseph Mesmer later sold his holdings in the area to one Mr. Howard Hughes, who used the land for his Hughes Airport. Following Hughes' death in 1976, the land has since been developed into the Playa Vista neighborhood.

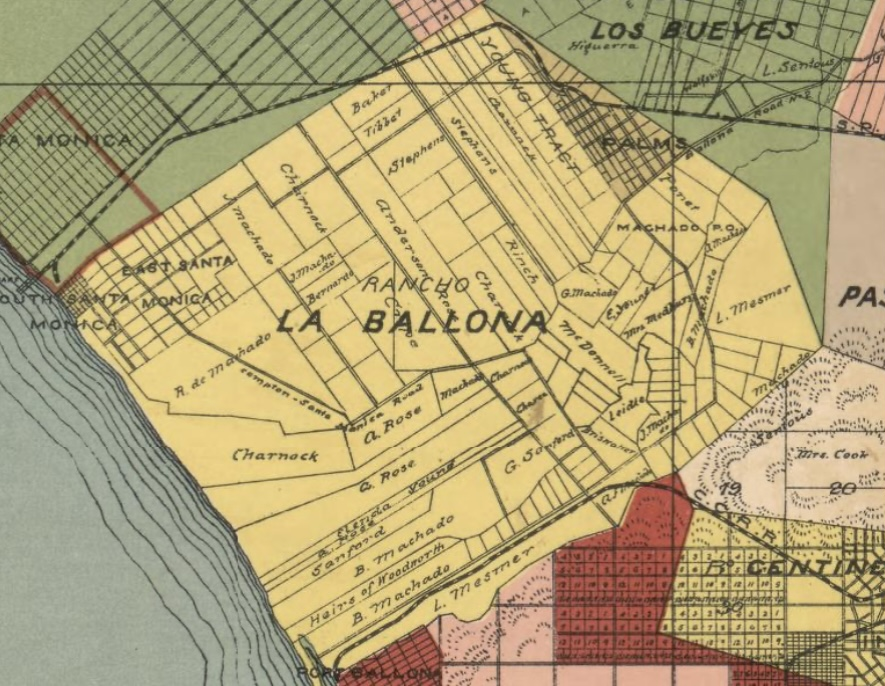
La Ballona, including Louis Mesmer's holdings, c. 1888

== Description ==
In October 1861 a Camp Latham soldier wrote the Daily Alta California expressing a desire for newspapers, and for good horses from Los Angeles (they currently had none), and provided this description of the site:

The camp is situated about nine miles eastward of Los Angeles, near a stream of good water and on level ground, but to the south and north at a distance of a half mile, or less, is a range of low hills, from which a hostile battery could sweep the whole command.

Sgt. Owen of the San Jose Volunteers wrote his mother, "Camp Latham is a fine spot, seven miles from Los Angeles, bounded by high, rough old mountains on the North—hills, and a perfect love of a brook to the South—sea on the West, and on the East, hills and forests."

On January 6, 1862 a "Letter from Camp Latham," dated to December 30, 1861, was published in the Sacramento Daily Union. The writer described the conditions of the camp:

For the past week it has rained nearly the whole time, and our parade ground is nearly floating, as we are encamped in a low valley. We are in tents without floors and without fire, so that it is no easy matter for us to keep dry, or rather, we are unable to do it, our beds and clothing being damp, and in many instances mildewed. The health of the men is very good, and if we are serving the great cause of "our country" by being here, we are content. _____________ Soldier.

In May 1862 the Trinity Journal published this account from "Charley," Company H, 4th California Infantry Regiment:

The next afternoon we sailed into the harbor of San Pedro, and were taken to the landing by a light draught steamer. San Pedro is a one-horse town, with a store, blacksmith shop and two or three third-class boarding houses, for the accommodation of those who are so unfortunate as to arrive hungry. The beef in this section is the finest I have ever seen, anywhere. We remained at San Pedro one night, making our beds in alkali dust six inches deep. At 10 o'clock next morning we filled our canteens and haversacks, and started for Camp Latham, twenty miles distant. This is the finest country I have ever seen, without exception.— We traveled through a rich grazing country the whole distance, which, however, is equally valuable for farming purposes. The clover known with you as "Alfalfa," is knee high the whole distance, We passed but two fields of grain, which would equal, if not excel, any I had ever seen. For the whole distance there is not a drop of good water—but little of any kind—and but one human habitation op the road. The lands are in the hands of monopolists, and years will expire before they will be properly cultivated, the owners in many cases, being Spanish or Mexican, of whose indolence you are well aware. After a walk of seven hours the main body of the detachment reached Camp Latham, and no one who has ever been here can deny but that it is the finest-situated camp and drill ground in the State. The camp is situated on an eminence, one hundred yards from which flows a beautiful stream of sparkling water, about the size of main Weaver Creek, lined with a dense grove of sycamores, and in the immediate vicinity of camp is a pretty grove of willows, planted tastefully by an old Spaniard, and which is beginning to form a pleasant retreat for the inhabitants of the neighborhood, and the troops at this point.

== Relative location ==
This is a table of distances (using original/archaic spelling as provided) between Camp Latham and Camp Wright via the wagon roads and footpaths of the day. Many of these locations were stops on the Butterfield Overland Mail in California that became U.S. Army camps during the Civil War era. This distances appeared in a guidebook to the western United States that was published just after the war in 1866.

Camp Latham to	Miles
Cienega	6 mi (9.7 km)
Los Angeles	12 mi (19 km)
Camp on Rio Los Angeles	18 mi (29 km)
Rio San Gabrielle	29 mi (47 km)
Chino Ranch	54 mi (87 km)
Rio Santa Ana	64 mi (103 km)
Temescal	79 mi (127 km)
Laguna Grande	93 mi (150 km)
Temacula	117 mi (188 km)
Camp Wright	137 mi (220 km)

== See also ==
- 1862 United States elections
- Rancho La Ballona
- Rancho Rincón de los Bueyes
- SS Ada Hancock
- California Road – Former route through the southwestern U.S.
