= District of Southern California =

19th c U.S. Army command

Scenery of Fort Tejon, a U.S. Army post in Southern California that was active during the American Civil War

The District of Southern California was a 19th-century district of Department of the Pacific, a command of the United States Army.

== History ==
Department of the Pacific was created January 15, 1861, during the American Civil War. The District of Southern California was established on September 25, 1861.

The district was composed of San Luis Obispo County, Tulare County, Santa Barbara County, Los Angeles County, San Bernardino County, and San Diego County. Tulare County at the time was composed of additional territory now belonging to Kern County, to Inyo County, Kings County and a small part of southeastern Fresno County. Santa Barbara County included what is now Ventura County, Los Angeles County included what is now Orange County and parts of Kern and Inyo County. San Bernardino County contained parts of Inyo and Riverside Counties. San Diego County included most of Riverside County, and Imperial County.

Its first headquarters was located at Camp Latham, located west of Los Angeles. The headquarters was later moved to Drum Barracks. On July 27, 1865, the Military Division of the Pacific was created under Major General Henry W. Halleck, replacing the Department of the Pacific. The department consisted of the Department of the Columbia and the expanded Department of California absorbing the District of Southern California that now consisted of the States of California and Nevada and the Territory of New Mexico and Territory of Arizona.

== Commanders ==
- Colonel George Wright, October 4, 1861 - October 14, 1861
- Colonel James H. Carleton, October 14, 1861 - November 18, 1861 (Carlton was relieved from command November 18, 1861 and resumed command February 5, 1862.)
- Colonel Joseph R. West, January 1862 - February 5, 1862
- Colonel James H. Carleton, February 5, 1862 - May 15, 1862
- Colonel Ferris Foreman, May 15, 1862 - May 17, 1862
- Colonel George W. Bowie, May 17, 1862. - February 7, 1863
- Lieutenant Colonel Harvey Lee, February 7, 1863 - April 10, 1863
- Colonel Ferris Forman, April 10, 1863 - June 19, 1863
- Lieutenant Colonel James F. Curtis, June 19, 1863 - July 27, 1865

== Events, skirmishes, and battles ==
=== 1861 ===
- Sept. 7, 1861. Skirmish near the upper Santa Ana Canyon, California.
- Sept. 14, 1861. Col. George Wright, U. S. 9th Infantry Regiment, assigned to command all troops serving in Southern California.
- Sept. 25, 1861. The District of Southern California created, uniting the counties of San Luis Obispo, Buena Vista, Tulare, Santa Barbara, Los Angeles, San Bernardino, and San Diego. Col. George Wright was assigned to its command.
- Oct. 5, 1861. Expedition from San Bernardino to the Temecula Ranch and Oak Grove, California.
- Oct. 4, 1861. Col. George Wright, U. S. 9th Infantry Regiment, assumes command of the District of Southern California.
- Oct. 14, 1861. Col. George Wright, U. S. 9th Infantry Regiment, transfers command of District of Southern California to Col. James H. Carleton, First California Infantry.
- Nov. 18, 1861. Col. James H. Carleton, First California Infantry, relieved from command of the District of Southern California.
- Nov. 20–29, 1861. Pursuit and capture of the Showalter Party at Warner's Ranch in the San Jose Valley, California.

=== 1862 ===
- Feb. 5, 1862. Col. James H. Carlton, First California Infantry, resumes command of the District of Southern California.
- March 19-Apr. 28, 1862. Expedition from Camp Latham to Owens River, California, with skirmish on April 9 near Bishop Creek, in the Owens River Valley.
- Apr. 10, 1862. Col. Ferris Forman, 4th California Infantry, assumes command of the District of Southern California.
- Apr. 13 - Sept. 20, 1862. Expedition from Southern California, through Arizona, to northwestern Texas and New Mexico.
- May 15, 1862. Expedition from California to Arizona and New Mexico, organized as the Column from California, Col. James H. Carleton, First California Infantry, commanding. Col. James H. Carleton relinquishes command of the District of Southern California.
- May 17, 1862. Col. George W. Bowie, Fifth California Infantry, assumes command of the District of Southern California.
- June 11 - Oct. 8, 1862. George S. Evans expedition from Camp Latham to Owens River, California, with skirmish on June 24 at Owens Lake.
- August 26, 1862. Col. James H. Carleton, First California Infantry, assigned to command the Department of New Mexico.
- August 30, 1862. The District of Arizona constituted to comprise all the territory from Fort Thorn, New Mexico, along the north bank of the Rio Grande to Fort Quitman, Texas.
- Sept. 5, 1862. Maj. David Fergusson, First California Cavalry, relieved from command of the District of Western Arizona. Maj. Theodore A. Coult, Fifth California Infantry, assigned to command of the District of Western Arizona. Col. Joseph R. West, First California Infantry, assumes command of the District of Arizona.

=== 1863 ===
- Feb. 7, 1863. Lieut. Col. Harvey Lee, Fourth California Infantry, assumes command of the District of Southern California.
- April 10, 1863. Col. Ferris Forman, Fourth California Infantry, assumes command of the District of Southern California.
- April 12–24, 1863. Expedition from Camp Babbitt to Keysville, California.
- April 24 - May 26, 1863. Operations in Owens River and adjacent valleys, Cal.
- May 19, 1863. Lieut. Col. James F. Curtis, Fourth California Infantry, assigned to command the District of Southern California, relieving Col. Ferris Forman.

=== 1864 ===
- Jan. 2, 1864. Occupation of Santa Catalina Island, Cal.
- July 1, 1864. Maj. Gen. Irvin McDowell, U. S. Army, assumes command of the Department of the Pacific. Brig. Gen. George Wright, U. S. Army, assigned to command the District of California.

=== 1865 ===
- July 27, 1865. The Military Division of the Pacific replaced the Department of the Pacific and consisted of the Departments of California and the Columbia. Maj. Gen. Henry W. Halleck, U. S. Army, was assigned to command the Military Division of the Pacific. The District of Southern California was absorbed into the newly created Department of California, consisting of the States of California and Nevada and the Territories of New Mexico and Arizona. Maj. Gen. Irvin McDowell, U. S. Army, was assigned to command the Department of California.

== Posts in the District of Southern California ==
- New San Diego Depot, 1851 - June, 1866.
- Fort Yuma, 1851 – 1883
- Fort Tejon 1854 - 1861, 1863 - 1864
- Camp San Bernardino 1858, 1861
- Fort Beale 1859 - 1861
- Fort Piute 1864 - 1868
- Fort Soda, Hancock's Redoubt 1860
- Fort Soda Lake or Camp Soda Springs 1863 - 1868
- Camp Cady, 20 miles east of Barstow 1860, 1862, 1864 - 1871
- Camp Fitzgerald June 1861 - September 20, 1861
- Fort on Pine Creek 1861-1865
- Camp Latham, September 1861 - March 1862
- Camp Kellogg 1861 - 1862
- Camp Carleton Fall 1861 - 1862
- Camp near Temecula 1861-1865
- Camp Wright, October 18, 1861 - December 1866
- Camp Drum later the Drum Barracks, January, 1862 - November 7, 1871.
- New Camp Carleton 1862-1865
- Post at Kline's Ranch, 1862
- Camp Laguna Grande 1862
- Camp Babbitt, June 24, 1862 - August 19, 1866
- Camp Leonard, 15 miles northeast of Keysville 1863
- Camp Morris, in San Bernardino June 6, 1863 - October 27, 1863
- Camp Independence July 4, 1862 - July 5, 1877
- Camp Coster, 1862 - 1863
- Camp Bishop Creek, 1863
- Camp Leonard, 1863
- Redoubt Bitter Springs, 1863-1868
- Camp Giftaler Ranch, 1863
- Camp Santa Barbara, 1864
- Camp Santa Catalina Island, 1864
- Camp Rancho Cucamonga, 1864
- Camp San Felipe, 1865

== See also ==
- California in the American Civil War
