= Camp Fitzgerald =

U.S. Army camp (1861), downtown Los Angeles

Coordinates: 34.0005°N 118.2317°W

Flag of the United States of America (1861–1863)

Before Camp Latham or Camp Drum existed in the District of Southern California during the American Civil War there was Camp Fitzgerald, located somewhere near downtown Los Angeles. Camp Fitzgerald was organized sometime after May 3 and before October 1861 by James H. Carleton out of Fort Tejon. Camp Fitzgerald was named for Edward H. Fitzgerald, a U.S. Army Major who had himself established Fort Jones but had died of consumption in January 1860. The New York Times mentioned the establishment of the camp, which then had four companies of men, on July 31, 1861: "...four companies of United States regulars were recalled from neighboring stations, and now occupy tents fronting the city named."

However Camp Fitzgerald was in a disadvantageous location for a "permanent camp and supply base," not least because of the distance from the port at San Pedro. Camp Fitzgerald was apparently relocated three times in hopes of finding better water and pasture for the horses but an ideal site was never found and Camp Fitzgerald, like Camp Latham, was eventually closed in favor of the Drum Barracks site which ultimately became the headquarters of the Army of the Pacific in southern California. Camp Fitzgerald likely lasted for less than a year, if that, but the exact date of closure is unclear.
