= Henry Dwight Barrows =

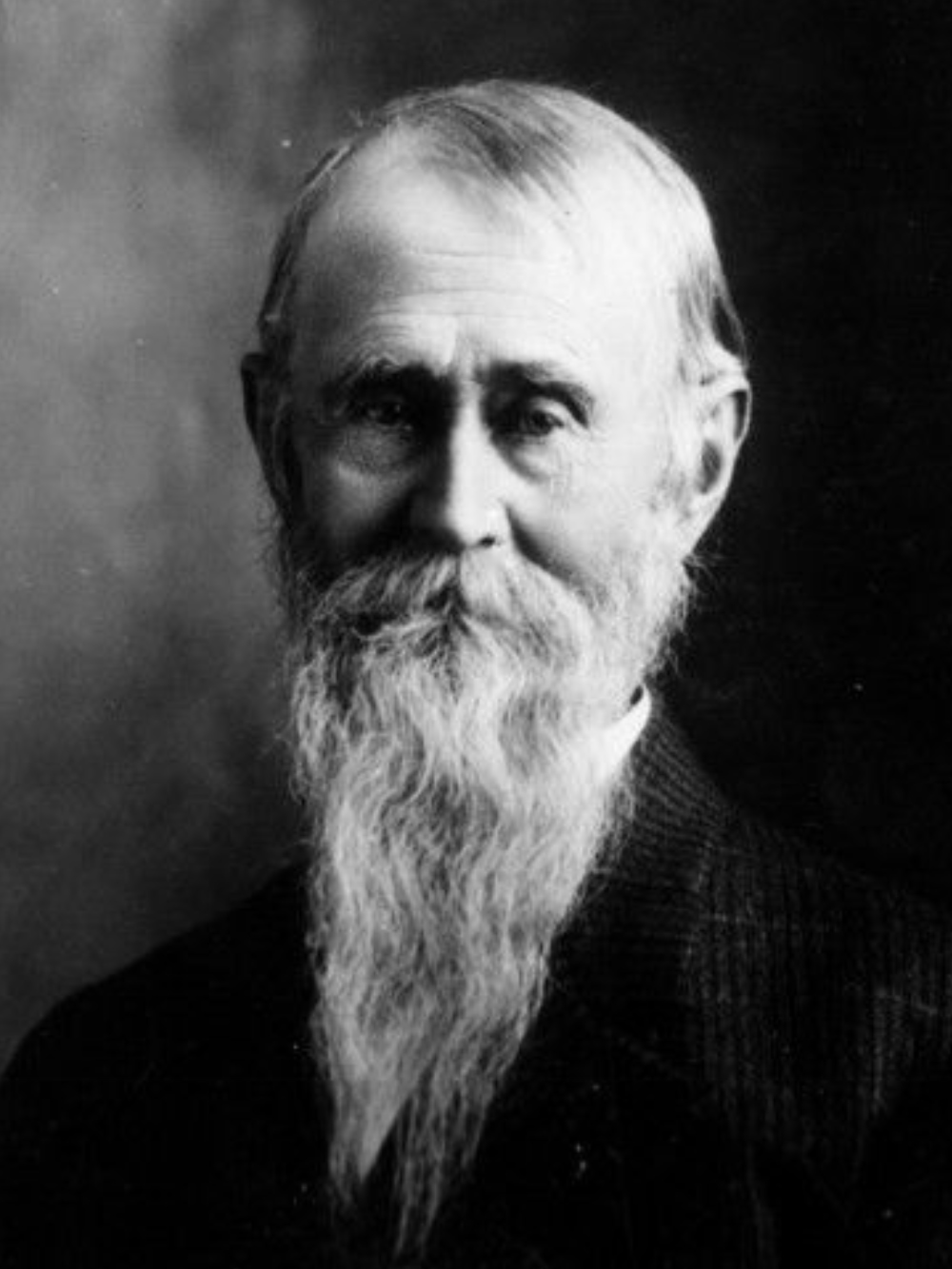
- Born: February 23, 1825; Mansfield, Connecticut
- Died: August 7, 1914 (aged 89); Los Angeles, California
- Burial place: Forest Lawn Memorial Park (Glendale); Glendale, California

Henry Dwight Barrows (February 23, 1825 – August 7, 1914) was an American teacher, businessman, farmer, goldminer, reporter, United States Marshal, Los Angeles County School Superintendent, manufacturer, writer, and a founder and president of the Historical Society of Southern California.

== Early life ==
Henry D. Barrows was born in Mansfield, Connecticut, February 23, 1825, a son of Joshua Palmer and Polly (Bingham) Barrows. The early years of his life were spent on a farm a village known as South Mansfield, or Mansfield Center. He received his education, in the public school, and later in the high school at South Coventry Afterward he spent several terms in the academy at Ellington When he was seventeen, he taught school for four years, and devoted considerable time to music, joining the local band, of which he became the leader, and taking lessons on the organ at Hartford.

His first business experience was clerking in New York City in 1849. The next year he went to Boston, where, as entry clerk and then as bookkeeper, he worked in the dry goods business of J. W. Blodgett & Co. for over two years acquiring business experience. While there he enjoyed the books, lectures, music, and opera., which that city afforded.

== Gold Rush and early life in Los Angeles ==
On April 26, 1852, he sailed for California from New York on the steamer SS Illinois to Aspinwall, crossed the isthmus of Panama, then took the connecting steamer SS Golden Gate to San Francisco. Soon after arrival, he went to the northern mines, going as far as Shasta County; but, as the dry season had set in, he returned down the valley, working at haying at $100 a month on Thomas Creek, near Tehama. He returned to San Francisco on July 31 with chills and fever, which the climate of that city only aggravated. He then went south to San Jose, where he raised a crop of wheat and barley which in 1852 to 1853 sold at a very high price. In the fall of 1853 he went to the Southern Mines, working at placer gold mining near Jamestown.

Later Barrows obtained an engagement as teacher of music in the Collegiate Institute in Benicia, remaining there until October 1854, when William Wolfskill, one of the earliest American pioneers of Los Angeles, hired him to teach a private school in his home at Los Angeles, from December 1854 until the latter part of 1858. His pupils were the sons and daughters of Mr. Wolfskill, the sons of his brother, Mathew; the children of Lemuel Carpenter, J.E. Pleasants, and others.

From 1856, for nearly ten years, he was the Los Angeles correspondent of the San Francisco Bulletin, then one of the most influential newspapers in California. In 1859-1860 he again turned to farming, cultivating a vineyard near the city on the east side of the Los Angeles River. On November 14, 1860, Barrows was married to his former pupil, Juanita Wolfskill, daughter of William Wolfskill and Magdalena (Lugo) Wolfskill, giving him family connections to several influential Californio families.

== Civil War ==
Until the formation of the Republican party Henry D. Barrows was a Whig when he voted for Fremont in 1856. He voted for every Republican candidate for president thereafter till 1900. During Lincoln's election campaign, he was chairman of his Los Angeles County committee.

By President Lincoln's recess appointment on April 9, 1861, he became the United States Marshall for the southern district of California, holding the office for four years. He replaced James C. Pennie, who had been removed from office. His appointment was confirmed by the Senate July 22, 1861, and was again appointed and confirmed by the Senate January 2, 1866.

On April 10, 1862, as the federal Marshal for Southern California, Henry D. Barrows, wrote to Brigadier General George Wright, commander of the Pacific Department of the Union Army, headquartered in San Francisco, complaining of anti-Union sentiment in Southern California. The letter says such sentiment "permeates society here among both the high and the low," and reports:

Andrew Jackson King, under-sheriff of this county, who has been a bitter secessionist, who said to me that he owed no allegiance to the United States Government; that Jeff Davis' was the only constitutional government we had, and that he remained here because he could do more harm to the enemies of that Government by staying here than going there; brought down on the Senator (a steam ship) Tuesday last a large lithograph gilt-framed portrait of Beauregard, the rebel general, which he flaunted before a large crowd at the hotel when he arrived. I induced Colonel Carleton to have him arrested as one of the many dangerous secessionists living in our midst, and to-day he was taken to Camp Drum. He was accompanied by General Volney E. Howard as counsel, and I have but little hope that he will be retained in custody.

Brought before Colonel Carleton, A. J. King was made to take an oath of allegiance to the Union and was then released. King unlike the members of the Los Angeles Mounted Rifles, was true to his word and did not flee to the Confederacy and in 1862, he was married to Laura Evertson, and remained in office as Undersheriff to 1865.

Also while Marshall, Barrows successfully petitioned to have the anti-Lincoln, pro-Democrat and pro-secessionist newspaper The Los Angeles Star banned from the use of the mails in October 1864 which ended its long existence as the city newspaper.

Barrows wife, Juanita Wolfskill, died January 31, 1863, some months after giving birth to their daughter, Alice Wolfskill Barrows, who was born July 16, 1862.

== Later life ==
From 1864 Barrows engaged in the mercantile business for fifteen years. On August 14, 1864, he married Mary Alice Workman, daughter of John D. Woodworth and widow of Thomas H. Workman, who was killed by the explosion of the steamer SS Ada Hancock in San Pedro Bay April 23, 1863. She died in Los Angeles March 9, 1868, leaving two daughters: Ada Frances, born May 21, 1865, and Mary Washington, born February 22, 1868, and died in infancy. Barrows third wife was Bessie A. Greene, a native of Utica, N.Y. They were married November 28, 1868, and had a son, Harry Prosper Barrows, born December 14, 1869.

For many years prior to the 1880s Barrows took an active part in public education. For much of the time during fifteen years he served as a member of the school board of Los Angeles. In 1867 he was elected city superintendent, and in 1868, county superintendent.

Barrows wrote on many subjects for the local press, and especially on financial questions, including resumption of specie payment and bimetallism. He contributed an essay to the contest in 1889 by M. Henri Cernuschi on International Bimetallism.

Mr. Barrows administered a number of large estates, including that of William Wolfskill. He was appointed by the United States district court one of the commissioners to run the boundary line between Rancho Providencia and that of the Rancho Ex-Mission San Fernando. Also, by appointment of the superior court, he was one of the commissioners who partitioned the Rancho San Pedro, which contained about 25,000 acres (100 km^{2}).

In 1868 he was president of the Historical Society of Southern California, of which he was one of the founders, and to the records of which he contributed many valuable papers of reminiscences. Barrows was also one of the charter members of the founders of the Society of Los Angeles Pioneers. He wrote about one hundred sketches of early pioneers of Los Angeles, most of whom he knew personally, for the Illustrated History of Los Angeles County, issued in 1889. He also wrote the text of the Illustrated History of Central California, published in 1893.

Barrows voted for every Republican candidate for president until 1900, when he voted for William J. Bryan. He believed that it had departed from its earlier dedication on behalf of universal freedom, and "to the happiness of free and equal men." Henry Dwight Barrows died on August 7, 1914, in Los Angeles.
