= 32nd New York Infantry Regiment =

- Active: May 31, 1861, to June 9, 1863
- Country: United States
- Allegiance: Union
- Branch: Infantry
- Engagements: First Battle of Bull Run; Peninsular Campaign; Battle of South Mountain; Battle of Antietam; Chancellorsville Campaign

The 32nd New York Infantry Regiment, also known as the "1st California Volunteers", was an infantry regiment that served in the Union Army during the American Civil War.

== Service ==
The regiment was organized in Staten Island, New York, from companies recruited in New York City, Amsterdam, Ithaca, Tarrytown, Johnstown, and Tompkins County. Initially, it also had several companies recruited in California, leading to the naming of the regiment as the "1st California," but those were soon transferred to a separate regiment; the nickname, however, remained attached to the 32nd New York unit. The regiment was mustered in for a two-year enlistment on May 31, 1861.

The regiment was mustered out of service on June 9, 1863, and those men who had signed three year enlistments or who re-enlisted were transferred to the 121st New York on April 19, 1864.

== Total strength and casualties ==
The regiment suffered 8 officers and 37 enlisted men who were killed in action or mortally wounded and 1 officer and 53 enlisted men who died of disease, for a total of 99 fatalities.

== Commanders ==
- Colonel Francis Effingham Pinto

== Flag ==
The of the regiment was presented with a National flag that was made in California in 1861. They later added the names of the battles they took part in across the stripes. In June of 1864, the flag was sent to San Francisco, California and was carried into City Hall where a large gathering of former members gave speeches about the flag than presented it to the Pioneer Society of the city. The flag was mostly likely lost during the 1906 earthquake.

== See also ==
- List of New York Civil War regiments
- James Hard
