= Fort Crook (California) =

Fort Crook was a U. S. Army post, first established as Camp Hollenbush in 1857, in Shasta County, California, northeast of Fall River Mills, California. The Fort Crook Museum covers its history.

== History ==
Camp Hollenbush was established by Captain John W.T. Gardiner commanding a detachment of soldiers from the 1st U.S. Dragoons and the 4th U.S. Infantry. The post was named for Assistant Surgeon Calvin G. Hollenbush. The post was later renamed Fort Crook for 1st Lieutenant George Crook, of the 4th U.S. Infantry, who commanded the Pitt River Expedition of 1857 and in one of the several engagements was severely wounded by an Indian arrow.

During the American Civil War California Volunteers garrisoned the post. From August 3–12, 1861, troops from this post made a Scout from Fort Crook to Round Valley, in Mendocino County

On August 5, 1861, other troops of the garrison fought a Skirmish in the Upper Pit River Valley with the Achomawi. On August 15–22, 1861 they conducted the Expedition from Fort Crook to the Pit River during which they fought a skirmish near Kellogg's Lake on August 19. The U.S. Army abandoned the post in 1869. The land was returned to the public domain in 1881.

== The location today ==
There are no remains at the original site. On November 11, 1934, the Fort Crook Historical Society, placed a historical marker for Fort Crook, in Fall River Mills at 41°05.318′N 121°30.861′W.

A restored cabin from the fort site was subsequently located at the Fort Crook Museum in Fall River Mills, California at the east intersection of McArthur Road & Soldier Mountain Road near the marker. In 2009, a round barn that was used in breaking and training wild horses for the U.S. Army was reconstructed on the grounds of the Fort Crook Museum.
