= Sidney Randolph DeLong =

American politician (1828–1914)

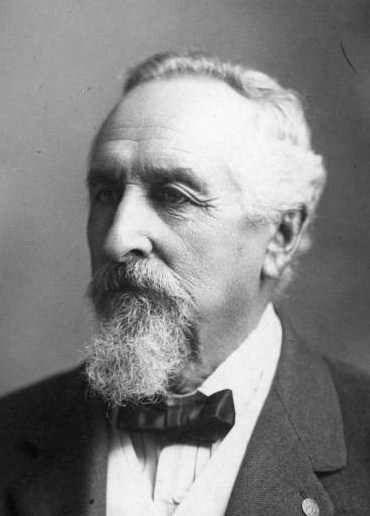

Council Member of the 8th Arizona Territorial Legislature
- In office January 4, 1875 – February 12, 1875

Mayor of Tucson, Arizona
- In office 1871–1872
- Succeeded by: James H. Toole

Personal details
- Born: December 28, 1828 Beekmantown, New York, US
- Died: November 24, 1914 (aged 85) Tucson, Arizona, US
- Party: Republican
- Spouses: Margaret née Jameson (her death); Maria née Frie

Military service
- Allegiance: United States; Union
- Branch/service: Union Army
- Years of service: 1861-1866
- Rank: First Lieutenant
- Unit: 1st California Infantry, 1st California Veteran Infantry Battalion

Sidney Randolph DeLong (December 28, 1828 – November 24, 1914) was the first elected mayor of Tucson, Arizona. Elected in 1871 for a one-year term, the municipality formed the township of Tucson with two sections of land purchased from the U.S. government. In 1874 DeLong represented the Tucson area in the 8th Arizona Territorial Legislature.

== Early years ==
He was born to Mary Huston DeLong of Grand Isle, Vermont, on December 28, 1828, in Beekmantown, New York. His father was from Goshen, Vermont. His parents met and married in Beekmantown where his father was a schoolteacher. His father died in 1832, when DeLong was three years old. He attended elementary school in Upstate New York, high school in Isle La Motte, Vermont. He studied civil engineering at the military academy in Plattsburgh, New York. Upon graduating he assisted in surveying the railroad line from Plattsburgh to Montreal.

In 1848 the California Gold Rush started. In 1849 DeLong sailed from New York, around Cape Horn, and arrived in San Francisco, California, in 1850. DeLong settled in Amador County where he worked as a placer miner and taught school.

== Civil War years ==
After the outbreak of the American Civil War, DeLong enlisted as a private at the Presidio, August 18, 1861. He mustered into Company C, 1st California Infantry August 26. On May 22, 1862, Delong, along with 1,500 California volunteers, 500 being cavalrymen, entered Tucson. Private DeLong was mustered out February 19, 1863, to accept a commission as a 2nd Lieutenant and was transferred to Company B.> He was promoted to 1st Lieutenant May 4, 1864. Lieutenant DeLong was mustered out in New Mexico Territory, October 31, 1864, and re-enlisted that same day to be mustered into Company B, 1st California Veteran Infantry Battalion. Lieutenant DeLong was mustered out in New Mexico Territory July 11, 1866.

DeLong served as acting assistant Quartermaster at Fort West, Fort Cummings, and Santa Fe in New Mexico, and Fort Goodwin, and Fort Tucson, in Arizona.

== Post-military years ==
After mustering out of the army in Santa Fe, DeLong returned to Tucson to work for Estevan Ochoa's freighting and mercantile firm Tully & Ochoa. On March 20, 1880, the Southern Pacific Railroad arrived in Tucson and business for freighting by horse-drawn wagon collapsed. DeLong left Tully & Ochoa to trade at Fort Bowie, and later mined gold in the Dos Cabezas, Arizona. In 1898 DeLong returned to Tucson, moving to 199 Church Street. From 1905 until his death DeLong was Secretary of the Arizona Pioneer Society, except one year when he was Receiver of the United States General Land Office.

Sidney R. DeLong died on November 24, 1914, in Tucson, Arizona.

== Offices ==
- Council Member of the 8th Arizona Territorial Legislature (1875)
- Mayor of Tucson (1871–1872)

== Civic activities ==
- Delong joined the Freemasons in Amador, California in December 1851, and was the oldest member in the state of Arizona when he died.
- He was Commander of the Tucson post of the Grand Army of the Republic.
- He was secretary of the Arizona Pioneer Society at the time of this death.

== Named after Sidney DeLong ==
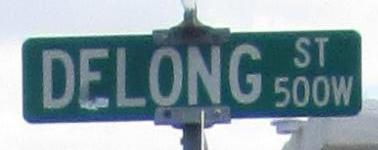

- DeLong street in Tucson, Arizona.
- DeLong Peak in the Santa Catalina Mountains northeast of Tucson
