= Fort Cummings =

- Location within New Mexico
- 32°27′56″N 107°38′45″W
- Location: Luna County, New Mexico

NM State Register of Cultural Properties
- Designated: December 21, 1969
- Reference no.: 35

Fort Cummings is a former U. S. Army post located near Cooke's Springs, in Luna County, New Mexico. It is located 20 miles northeast of Deming, New Mexico.

== Cooke's Spring ==
Cooke's Spring (32.46277°N 107.64863°W) was named for Philip St. George Cooke 2nd U.S. Dragoons the former commander of the Mormon Battalion, that was exploring this area of New Mexico in 1853. It was the only large supply of fresh water between Mesilla and the Mimbres River for wagons heading to California on the Southern Emigrant Trail as well as the later Butterfield Overland Mail stagecoach route. The Cooke's Spring Station of the Butterfield Overland Mail was located near Cooke's Spring from 1858 to 1861.

Cookes Springs were located at the eastern mouth of the upper part of Cooke's Canyon which led to Cooke's Pass a narrow gap in the Cooke's Range(32.79218°N 107.72129°W). Between 1848 and 1861 the pass was a dangerous place for travelers, who were often ambushed and killed by the Apache as they passed through it. Following the Bascom Affair things were even worse as the Apache, formerly friendly to the stage company, destroyed most of the stations and destroyed many coaches and killed their passengers and for over a decade later hundreds of other travelers. Cooke's Pass was a favored location for ambushes, and it acquired the name Massacre Canyon after incidents like the Battle of Cookes Canyon.

The fort was first established nearby the stage station on October 2, 1863, by Captain Valentine Dresher, Company B, 1st California Infantry, of the California Column. Fort Cummings was established to control the Apache Indians, and to protect the Butterfield – Overland stage route and the southern overland road to California where it passed through Cooke's Pass.

The fort was built up over the next ten years as an adobe walled fort, surrounded by a 10-foot-high wall that enclosed a parade ground, corral and several single-story adobe buildings around the wall.

The fort was evacuated and entered a caretaker status in 1870 and abandoned in 1873. However it was reoccupied later when Apache under Victorio, launched a campaign against the white American settlers in 1880. It was known as "Camp at Fort Cummings" from 1880 to 1884 and in 1886 during later Apache troubles. The Fort was ordered permanently closed by President Bejamin Harrison on October 7, 1891. Its only remains are some eroding adobe walls, plus the nearby site of the stage station and post graveyard to the south.

== Garrisons ==
- Company B, 1st California Infantry Regiment, October 2, 1863 – June, 1864
- Company I, 5th California Infantry Regiment, June, 1864 – October, 1864
- Company F, 5th California Infantry Regiment, 1864 – November 1864
- Company F, 1st California Veteran Infantry Battalion, January 1865 – Disbanded at Fort Cummings, March 16, 1865.
- Company B, 1st California Veteran Infantry Battalion, April 1865 – August 1866. Scout from Fort Cummings April 28 – May 13, 1865
- Company D, 125th Infantry Regiment U.S. Colored Troops, August 12, 1866 – October 2, 1867
- Company A, 38th Infantry Regiment, October 1867 – June 6, 1868
- Company F, 38th Infantry Regiment, June 4, 1868 - March 15, 1869
- 24th Infantry Regiment, March 15, 1869 – 1870. Fort evacuated
- 3rd Cavalry Regiment, 1866–1870. Detachments assigned to fort
- Company E, 15th Infantry Regiment, August 1870
- 4th Cavalry Regiment, 1880–1882. Periodically used the fort site as a camp during operations against the Apache
- 8th Cavalry Regiment, 1882–1886. Periodically used the fort site as a camp during operations against the Apache

== Sources ==
- William Thornton Parker, Annals of old Fort Cummings, New Mexico, 1867-8, Published by Author, Northampton, Mass., 1916.
- Records of California men in the war of the rebellion 1861 to 1867, By California. Adjutant General's Office, SACRAMENTO: State Office, J. D. Young, Supt. State Printing. 1890.
