= Cooke's Pass =

Gap running through Cookes Range in New Mexico

Coordinates: 32°27′15″N 107°40′49″W

Cooke's Pass, also known as Massacre Canyon, is a narrow gap running east and west through the Cookes Range In Luna County, New Mexico. Its apex is a saddle, at an elevation of about 5100 feet between Fryingpan Canyon on the west and the narrow upper part of Cooke's Canyon west of Cooke's Spring. Cooke's Pass is just north of Massacre Peak.

== History ==
The Southern Emigrant Trail passed through Cooke's Pass and it was also the route of the San Antonio-San Diego Mail Line, Butterfield Overland Mail, and other stagecoach lines.

Its nickname Massacre Canyon dates from the time of the Apache Wars following the Bascom Affair when the Apache, formerly friendly to the Americans and the stage company destroyed most of the stations and many coaches and killed many of the station staff, drivers and passengers. Thereafter Cooke's Pass was a favored location for ambushes and it acquired the name Massacre Canyon after many incidents like the Battle of Cookes Canyon.

Near the end of the American Civil War, Fort Cummings was established near Cooke's Spring and stage station to protect travelers along the stage route here.
