= Cooke's Spring Station =

Overland Mail stagecoach stop in New Mexico

Coordinates: 32°27′46″N 107°38′52″W

Cooke's Spring Station, located near Cooke's Spring, New Mexico was a stage station of the Butterfield Overland Mail stage route from 1858 to 1861 and of subsequent stage lines until made obsolete by the arrival of the transcontinental railroad in New Mexico.

Cooke's Spring was located at the eastern mouth of Cooke's Canyon, part of Cooke's Pass a narrow gap in the Mimbres Mountains running east and west. Cooke's Spring was named for Philip St. George Cooke, 2nd U.S. Dragoons, the former commander of the Mormon Battalion, that was exploring this area of New Mexico in 1853. It was the only large supply of fresh water between Mesilla, New Mexico and the Mimbres River for wagon trains heading to California as well as the later Butterfield Overland Mail Stage. The Cooke's Spring Stage Station of the Butterfield Overland Mail stage route was located near Cooke's Springs from 1858 to 1861.

Between 1848 and 1861 the pass was a dangerous place. Travelers were occasionally ambushed and killed by the Apache as they passed through it. However following the Bascom Affair things were even worse until the end of the Apache Wars as the Apache, formerly friendly to the Americans and the stage company destroyed most of the stations and destroyed many coaches and killed their passengers. Thereafter Cooke's Pass was a favored location for these ambushes and it acquired the name Massacre Canyon after many incidents like the Battle of Cookes Canyon.

Near the end of the Civil War Fort Cummings was established near the spring and stage station to protect travelers along the stage route and as a base of operations in the Apache Wars in the following decades.
