= Edwin Augustus Rigg =

Union Army officer (1822–1882)

- Born: January 15, 1822; Philadelphia, Pennsylvania
- Died: January 27, 1882 (aged 60); Contention City, Arizona
- Burial place: Contention City Cemetery
- Other name: Edwin Augustus Riggs
- Spouse: Emma Antoinette Cooper (m. 1862)
- Children: 1
- Military career
- Allegiance: United States (Union)
- Branch: Union army
- Service years: 1861–1871
- Rank: Colonel
- Commands: 1st California Infantry (1861–1866); 1st Battalion of Veteran Infantry (1865–1866); 38th Infantry Regiment (1866–1870); 25th Infantry Regiment (1870–1871)
- Conflicts: American Civil War; Apache Wars
- Other work: Justice of the peace

Edwin Augustus Rigg (1822–1882), 49er, was a military officer in the American Civil War and the Apache Wars.

== Early life ==
Edwin Augustus Rigg was born January 15, 1822, in Philadelphia, Pennsylvania. He moved to California in 1849.

By September, 1852, he was an employee of the San Francisco custom house. Later that year he ran as a Whig for the office of City Tax Collector of San Francisco.

He joined the Marion Rifles, an outstanding military unit of the California Militia and one of the oldest volunteer companies in the State. He became an officer on November 7, 1855, serving as a first lieutenant. Became its captain April 19, 1856, and was reelected December 17, 1856, and in 1861.

== American Civil War ==
On August 5, 1861, Captain Rigg with four other militia captains offered the services of their companies to the United States Government to protect the Overland Mail Route.

Joined the 1st California Infantry, with many of his militia company August 15, 1861. He was made captain of Company B, formed largely from men from the Marion Rifles and other militia companies in San Francisco and others recruited at Camp Latham, near Los Angeles.

Promoted Major, 1st California Infantry, Sept. 5, 1861. He was sent to Fort Yuma to relieve Lt. Col. Joseph R. West as commander of Fort Yuma on November 26, 1861. While its commander he saw to the gathering of supplies of food and forage for the advance of the California Column between the Fort and the Pima Villages with the help of Ammi M. White.

Promoted Lt. Colonel commanding 1st California Infantry, on April 28, 1862, during the California Column march from Fort Yuma to Fort Barrett at the Pima Villages. After the Californians had recovered New Mexico Territory and captured Franklin, in West Texas, they settled into occupation garrisons and fought to defend the territories of Arizona and New Mexico and West Texas from Apache and Navaho raiders.

Rigg married seventeen-year-old Emma Antoinette Cooper November 26, 1862, in Mesilla, New Mexico, daughter of Hiram Cooper the superintendent of Hart's Mill near El Paso. Rigg's daughter, Sarah Adelia Rigg, was born at Ft. Craig, NM, on Dec. 5, 1863.

During his time in Arizona he established Fort Goodwin on the Gila River under the direction of General Carleton directed operations against the Apache. Promoted Colonel at Fort Craig, N.M. April 1864, he was discharged at Santa Fe in September 1864. His regiment was consolidated into a battalion the 1st Battalion of Veteran Infantry. On February 1, 1865, he was commissioned as Lieutenant Colonel of that unit, with headquarters at Fort Craig. The battalion was mustered out in September 1866. He served until being mustered out on October 13, 1866, at Los Pinos, New Mexico, as Colonel of the 1st California Infantry.

== U.S. Army career ==
Rigg decided to stay in the military, joining the regular Army after the Civil War. After failing the examination to become a Regular Army officer, Rigg was able to obtain the signatures of several politicians and a U. S. Senator on his petition for a new examination. Succeeding on the next try, Rigg received a commission in the 38th U.S. Infantry Regiment, one of the four regiments of veterans of the United States Colored Troops remaining in the U. S. Army. Riggs went on to serve as a 1st Lieutenant in the 38th U.S. Infantry at places like Fort Selden, New Mexico where he served in 1869.

In 1870, when the four colored regiments including the 38th were consolidated, he went to join the 25th U.S. Infantry as First Lientenant. Nearly half of the officers were crowded out of the army when the original four colored regiments were reduced to two. Rigg was one of them. On January 1, 1871, he was discharged, as part of the reduction in forces.

== Later life ==
An 1871, Senate bill No. 520 was passed that provided for the relief of Edwin A. Rigg, for his service as late lieutenant colonel of the First Regiment Infantry California volunteers, making him a Postmaster at Fort Craig. He served there from October 30, 1873, until October 23, 1877.

He moved to Arizona and was a member of Tombstone's Burnside Post, Grand Army of the Republic. In 1881, Rigg went on to become the justice of the peace in Contention City, Arizona. There he died of pneumonia on January 27, 1882, and was buried in the Contention City Cemetery.
