= Massacre Peak =

Mountain in New Mexico, United States

- Location within New Mexico

Highest point
- Elevation: 5,667 ft (1,727 m) NGVD 29
- Coordinates: 32°26′41″N 107°40′30″W

Geography
- Location: Luna County, New Mexico, U.S.
- Parent range: Cookes Range
- Topo map: USGS Massacre Peak

Massacre Peak, a summit at an elevation of 5,667 feet (1,727 m) in the Cookes Range in Luna County, New Mexico.

== History ==
The route of the Southern Emigrant Trail passed just north of this peak as did the San Antonio-San Diego Mail Line, Butterfield Overland Mail, and other stagecoach lines.

The peaks name refers to the time of the Apache Wars following the Bascom Affair when the Apache destroyed most of the stations and many coaches and killed many of the station staff, drivers and passengers. Many violent incidents followed such as the Battle of Cookes Canyon.

Near the end of the American Civil War, Fort Cummings was established two miles (3.2 km) northeast of the peak, near Cooke's Spring and stage station.
