= List of California State Militia units in the American Civil War =

The following are California State Militia units that were active between 1861 and 1865 during the American Civil War.

== Volunteer Companies of the California State Militia 1860–1866 ==
=== Alameda County ===
- Alvarado Guard, Company F, 5th Infantry Regiment, 2nd Brigade, Alvarado, 1863–1866
- Brooklyn Guard, Unattached Company, 2nd Brigade. San Leandro, 1865–1866
- Hayward Guard, Unattached Company, 2nd Brigade. Hayward, 1864–1868
- Jackson Guard, Unattached Company, 2nd Brigade. Oakland, 1865–1866
- Oakland Home Guard, Oakland, (1861–1863)
  - Oakland Guard, Company C, 1st Infantry Battalion, 2nd Brigade. Oakland, (1863–1866)

=== Alpine County ===
- Markleville Guard, changed to Alpine Rifles, Unattached Company, 4th Brigade. Markleville, 1864–1866

=== Amador County ===
- Amador Hussars, Unattached Company, 4th Brigade. Jackson, 1861–1862
- Amador Mountaineers, Jackson 1861, became Company C, 1st Regiment California Volunteer Infantry
- Ione City Guard, Unattached Company, 4th Brigade. Ione 1863–1866
- Jackson Guard, Unattached Company, 4th Brigade. Jackson 1863–1866
- Sutter Creek Volunteers, Unattached Company, 4th Brigade. Sutter Creek 1861-1862
- Sutter Creek Guard, Unattached Company C, 4th Brigade. Sutter Creek, 1864–1866
- Volcano Blues, Company C, 4th Infantry Regiment, 4th Brigade. Volcano 1861–1866
- Volcano Guard, Volcano, 1858–1861

=== Butte County ===
- Bangor Guard, Unattached Company, 5th Brigade. Bangor, 1864–1866
- Butte County Dragoons, Oroville 1861
- Butte Mounted Rifles, Oroville, 1861
  - Chico Light Infantry, Chico, 1863–1866
- California Volunteers, Oroville, 1861 became part of 1st Regiment California Volunteer Infantry
- Oroville Guard, Oroville, 1856–1857, 1861–1868

=== Calaveras County ===
- Angels Guard, Company H, 3rd Infantry Regiment, 3rd Brigade. Angel's Camp, 1862–1868
- Mokelumne Hill Rifles, Unattached Company, 3rd Brigade. Mokelumne Hill, 1863–1866
- Union Guard, Company C, 2nd Battalion, 3rd Brigade. Poverty Bar, 1861–1866
- Union Guard, Unattached Company, 3rd Brigade. Copperopolis, 1864–66

=== Contra Costa County ===
- Contra Costa Guard, Company G, 1st Cavalry Battalion, 2nd Brigade. San Pablo, 1863–1866

=== Del Norte County ===
- Crescent City Guard, Unattached Company, 2nd Brigade, 6th Division. Crescent City, 1861-1864

=== El Dorado County ===
- Banks Guard, Company E, 2nd Infantry Battalion, 4th Brigade. Smith's Flat, 1863–1866
- Coloma Greys, Coloma, 1857–1862, disbanded after most of its men joined the Second and Fourth Regiments of California Volunteers.
- El Dorado Mountaineers, Company G, 2nd Infantry Battalion, 4th Brigade. El Dorado 1863-1866
- Georgetown Union Guard, Company A, 2nd Infantry Battalion, 4th Brigade. Georgetown, 1863–1868
- National Guard, Company D, 2nd Infantry Battalion, 4th Brigade. Placerville, 1863–1866
- Placerville City Guard, Company B, 2nd Infantry Battalion, 4th Brigade. Placerville, 1863–1866
- Placerville Guard, 4th Brigade, 1st Division. Placerville, 1862

=== Fresno County ===
- None

=== Humboldt County ===
- Arcata Guard, Company B, 6th Brigade. Arcata, 1862-1867
- Eureka Rifles, Attached to 6th Brigade. Eureka, 1862–1864
- Humboldt Volunteers, Attached to 2nd Brigade. Hydesville, 1860
- Mounted Volunteers, Attached to 2nd Brigade. Humboldt County, 1861

=== Lake County ===
- None

=== Lassen County ===
- Honey Lake Rangers, Unattached Cavalry Company, 5th Brigade. Susanville, 1864–1866

=== Los Angeles County ===
- Los Angeles Greys, attached to 1st Brigade, 1st Division. Los Angeles, 1861
- Los Angeles Guard, Attached to 1st Brigade. Los Angeles, 1853-1881
- Los Angeles Mounted Rifles, Attached to 1st Brigade. Los Angeles, 1861
- Monte Mounted Rifles, El Monte, 1861

=== Marin County ===
- Lincoln Cavalry, Company M, 1st Cavalry Regiment, 2nd Brigade. Tomales, 1864–1866
- Washington Rifles, Tomales, 1864

=== Mariposa County ===
- Coulterville Rifles, Unattached Company, 3rd Brigade. Coulterville, 1864–1866

=== Mendocino County ===
- None

=== Merced County ===
- None

=== Mono County ===
- Esmerelda Rifles, Attached to 3rd Brigade. Aurora, 1862
- Hooker Light Infantry, Attached to 3rd Brigade. Aurora, 1863

=== Monterey County ===
- Conner Guard, Attached to First Brigade. Monterey, 1863–1866

=== Napa County ===
- Napa Guard, Unattached company, 2nd Brigade. Napa City & County, 1861–1868
- Napa Rangers, Company L, 1st Cavalry Regiment, 2nd Brigade. Napa City & County, 1864–1868
- Washington Light Artillery, Unattached Co., 2nd Brigade. Napa City & County, 1863–1866

=== Nevada County ===
- Company "H", Nevada City, 1861 It became Company G, 1st Regiment California Volunteer Infantry
- Eureka Rangers, Unattached Company, of the Fourth Brigade. Moores Flat, 1863–1866
- Grass Valley Union Guard, Company A, 5th Infantry Battalion, 4th Brigade. Grass Valley, 1863–1865
  - Howell Zouaves, Company E, 5th Infantry Battalion, 4th Brigade. Grass Valley, 1865–1872
- Little York Union Guard, Company C, 5th Infantry Battalion, 4th Brigade. You Bet, 1863–1867
- Nevada Light Guard, Unattached Company, 4th Brigade. Nevada City, 1863–1878
- Nevada Rifles, Unattached Company, 2nd Brigade, 4th Division. Nevada City, 1858–1863
- San Juan Guard or Bridgeport Union Guard, Unattached Company, 4th Brigade. North San Juan, 1863–1866

=== Placer County ===
- Auburn Greys, Company A, 1st Infantry Battalion, 4th Brigade. Auburn, 1861–1868
- Forest Hill Guard, Company B, 1st Infantry Battalion, 4th Brigade. Forest Hill, 1861–1866
- Lincoln & Virginia Union Guard, Company D, 1st Infantry Battalion, 4th Brigade. Lincoln, 1863–1866
- Mountain Volunteers, Forest Hill, 1861, disbanded, when many company members joined the Volunteer Infantry for active duty.
- Pacific Guard, Company C, 1st Infantry Battalion, 4th Brigade. Dutch Flat, 1861–1868
- Pilot Hill Rangers, Company F, 2nd Infantry Battalion, 4th Brigade. Pilot Hill, 1864–1866
- Placer Cadets, Company F, 1st Infantry Battalion, 4th Brigade. Iowa Hill, 1865–1866
- Placer County Mountaineers, Forest Hill, 1861, disbanded, when many of the company's members joined the Volunteer Infantry for active duty.
- Placer Guard, Iowa Hill, 1861–1862
- Shields Guard, Company C, 2nd Infantry Regiment, 2nd Brigade. Forest Hill, 1861
- Union Corps, Company D, 1st Infantry Battalion, 4th Brigade. Michigan Bluff, 1862–1863
- Yankee Jims Rifles, Company E, 1st Infantry Battalion, 4th Brigade. Yankee Jim's, 1863–1867

=== Plumas County ===
- Indian Valley Rifles, Taylorville 1863 Never an effective unit.
- Union Guard, Quincy 1863-1864 Never an effective unit.

=== Sacramento County ===
- Baker Guard, Company H, 4th Infantry Regiment, 4th Brigade. Sacramento, 1863–1866
- Emmet Guard, Company E, 4th Infantry Regiment, 4th Brigade. Sacramento, 1864-1872
- Granite Guard, Unattached Company, 4th Brigade. Folsom 1861–1863
- Independent City Guard, Company A, 2nd Battalion, 4th Brigade. Sacramento, 1856–1880
- National Guard, Company D, 4th Infantry Regiment, 4th Brigade. Sacramento, 1862–1867
- Sacramento Hussars, Unattached Company, 4th Brigade. Sacramento, 1863–1874
- Sacramento Light Artillery, Sacramento, 1864–1880
- Sacramento Sharp Shooters, Company F, 4th Infantry Regiment, 4th Brigade. Sacramento, 1863–1866
- Turner Rifles, Company E, 4th Regiment of Infantry, 4th Brigade. Sacramento, 1863–1864
- Walnut Grove Union Guard, Unattached Company, 4th Brigade. Walnut Grove 1863–1866
- Washington Rifles, Sacramento City & County, 1861 It became Company E, 1st Regiment California Volunteer Infantry

=== San Bernardino County ===
- San Bernardino Rangers, Attached to 1st Brigade. San Bernardino, 1861–1862

=== San Diego County ===
- San Diego Guard, Attached to 1st Brigade, 1st Division. San Diego, 1856-1863

=== San Francisco County ===
- Black Hussars then "San Francisco Hussars", San Francisco City & County, 1859–1862
  - San Francisco Hussars, Company B, 1st Cavalry Regiment, 2nd Brigade. San Francisco City & County, 1862–1891 Formerly the Black Hussars.
- Carbineers, Company G, First Infantry Regiment, Second Brigade. San Francisco City & County, 1859–1862
- California Grenadiers, Company D, 6th Infantry Regiment, 2nd Brigade. San Francisco City & County, 1864–1866
- California Musketeers, Company H, 6th Infantry Regiment, 2nd Brigade. San Francisco City & County, 1864–1866
- California Rifles, 1863 ?
- California Rifles (French Guard), Company H, First Infantry Regiment, Second Brigade. San Francisco City & County, 1860-1862
- California Tigers, Company D, 2nd Infantry Battalion, 2nd Brigade. San Francisco City & Co., 1865–1869
- Columbian Guard, Company D, 1st Infantry Regiment, 2nd Brigade. San Francisco City & County, 1863–1869
- Ellis Guard, Company C, 6th Infantry Regiment, 2nd Brigade. San Francisco City & County, 1863–1866
- Ellsworth Guard Zouaves, Company B, 1st Regiment Artillery, 2nd Brigade. San Francisco City & County, 1862–1866
- Ellsworth Rifles, Company K, 1st Infantry Regiment, 2nd Brigade. San Francisco City & County, 1861–1872
- Ellsworth Zouaves Cadettes, Unattached Company, 2nd Brigade. San Francisco City & County, 1864–1866
- Emmett Life Guard, Unattached Company, 2nd Brigade. San Francisco City & County, 1862–1866
- Eureka Guard, Company I, 1st Artillery Regiment, 2nd Brigade. San Francisco City & County, 1865–1869
- Federal Guard, Unattached Company, 2nd Brigade. San Francisco City & County, 1865–1866
- First California Guard, Company A, Light Battery, 1st Artillery Regiment, 1st Brigade. San Francisco City & County, 1849–1875
- First Light Dragoons, Company A, 1st Cavalry Battalion, 2nd Brigade. San Francisco City & County, 1852–1880
- Franklin Light Guard, Company E, 1st Artillery Regiment, 2nd Brigade. San Francisco City & County, 1861–1873
- Germania Guard, Company G, 6th Infantry Regiment, 2nd Brigade. San Francisco City & County, 1864–1866
- Governors Guard, Unattached Company, 2nd Brigade. San Francisco City & County, 1865–1866
- Grant Guard, Company B, 2nd Infantry Battalion, 2nd Brigade. San Francisco City & County, 1864–1867
- Hibernia Greens, Unattached Company, 2nd Brigade. San Francisco City & County, 1865–1866
- Hugh O'Neil Guard, Company K, 2nd Infantry Regiment, 2nd Brigade. San Francisco City & County, 1863–1866
- Independent National Guard, Company C, 1st Infantry Regiment, 2nd Brigade. San Francisco City & County, 1859–1880
- Jackson Dragoons, Company C, 1st Cavalry Regiment, 2nd Brigade. San Francisco City & County, 1863–1881
- Liberty Guard, Company F, 1st Regiment Artillery, 2nd Brigade. San Francisco City & County, 1864–1866
- Lincoln Guard, Company A, 2nd Infantry Battalion, 2nd Brigade. San Francisco City & County, 1864–1855
- Wolfe Tone Guard, San Francisco City & County, 1862
- Marion Rifles, Unattached Company, 2nd Brigade. San Francisco City & County, 1852–1861
- Meagher Guard (Irish Invincible), Company E, 2nd Infantry Battalion, 2nd Brigade. San Francisco City & County, 1862–1866
- Mechanics Rifles, Company F, 2nd Artillery Regiment, 2nd Brigade. San Francisco City & County, 1864–1866
- Mission Guard, Unattached Company, 2nd Infantry Regiment, 2nd Brigade. Mission Dolores, 1864–1866
- Montgomery Guard, Company B, 1st Infantry Battalion, 2nd Brigade. San Francisco City & County, 1859–1880
- McClelland Guard to Dec. 1865, thereafter "Excelsior Guard", Company B, 1st Infantry Battalion, 2nd Brigade. San Francisco City & County, 1862–1866
- McMahon Guard, Company B, 2nd Infantry Regiment, 2nd Brigade. San Francisco City & County, 1859-1879
- San Francisco Cadets, Company K, 1st Regiment Artillery, 2nd Brigade. San Francisco City & County, 1863-1884
- San Francisco Light Guard, Company F, 1st Infantry Regiment, 2nd Brigade. San Francisco City & County, 1858–1880
- San Francisco Tiralleurs, Company F, 6th Infantry Regiment, 2nd Brigade. San Francisco City & County, 1864–1880
- San Francisco Jaegers, Company K, 6th Infantry Regiment, 2nd Brigade. San Francisco City & County, 1864–1866
- Seward Guard, Unattached Company, 2nd Brigade. San Francisco City & County, 1865–1866
- Sheridan Guard, Company C, 2nd Infantry Battalion, 2nd Brigade. San Francisco City & County, 1864–1866
- Shields Guard, Company C, 2nd Infantry Regiment, 2nd Brigade. San Francisco City & County, 1862–1869
- Sigel Rifles, Company B, 6th Infantry Regiment, 3rd Brigade. San Francisco City & County, 1861–1866
- State Guard, Company A, 1st Infantry Regiment, 2nd Brigade. San Francisco City & County, 1863–1869
- Tittel Zouaves, Company I, 6th Infantry Regiment, 2nd Brigade. San Francisco City & County, 1864–1866
- Union Guard (Gatling Battery), Company A, 1st Regiment Artillery, 2nd Brigade. San Francisco City & County, 1861–1881
- Washington Continental Guard, Company D, 1st Infantry, 2nd Brigade. San Francisco City & County, 1855–1862
  - Washington Light Infantry, Company D, 1st Infantry, 2nd Brigade. San Francisco City & County, 1862–1878 Formerly Washington Continental Guard.

=== San Joaquin County ===
- Castoria Guard, Unattached Company, 3rd Brigade. French Camp, 1864–1866
- Linden Light Dragoons, Unattached Company, 3rd Brigade. Linden, 1863–1864
- Mokelumne Light Dragoons, Unattached Company, 3rd Brigade. Lockeford, 1863–1867
- San Joaquin Mounted Rifles, Unattached Company, 1st Brigade, 3rd Division. Knight's Ferry, 1858–1862
- Stockton Blues, Stockton, 1859–1861
- Stockton City Guard, Unattached Company, 3rd Brigade. Stockton, 1864–1866
- Stockton Light Artillery, Unattached Company, 3rd Brigade. Stockton, 1864–1868
- Stockton Light Dragoons, Unattached Company, 3rd Brigade. Stockton, 1862–1866
- Stockton Union Guard, Unattached Company, 3rd Brigade. Stockton, 1861–1866

=== San Luis Obispo County ===
- none

=== San Mateo County ===
- Jefferson Cavalry, Company H, 1st Cavalry Regiment, 2nd Brigade. Redwood City, 1864–1866

=== Santa Barbara County ===
- none

=== Santa Clara County ===
- Alviso Rifles (Guards), Company C, 5th Infantry Battalion, 2nd Brigade. Alviso Mills, 1863–1866
- Burnett Light Guard, Company I, 1st Cavalry Regiment, 2nd Brigade. San Jose, 1864–1866
- Gilroy Guard, Company E, 5th Infantry Regiment, 2nd Brigade. Gilroy, 1863–1866
- Johnson Guard, Unattached Company, 2nd Brigade. San Jose, 1865–1866
- National Guard, San Jose, 1857–1861, disbanded when many of its members joined the regular army.
- National Light Artillery, Unattached Company, 2nd Brigade. San Jose, 1863
- New Almaden Cavalry, Company K, 1st Cavalry Regiment, 2nd Brigade. New Almaden, 1864–1866
- San Jose Volunteers, San Jose, 1861 Became Company D, 1st Regiment California Volunteer Infantry
- Redwood Cavalry, Company E, 1st Cavalry Regiment, 2nd Brigade. McCarthysville, 1863–1866
- San Jose Zouaves, Company H, 1st Artillery Regiment, 2nd Brigade. San Jose, 1862–1866
- Santa Clara Light Infantry, Company F, 1st Artillery Regiment, 2nd Brigade. Santa Clara, 1861–1864 Renamed Santa Clara Guard in 1864.
  - Santa Clara Guard, Company H, 5th Infantry Regiment, 2nd Brigade. Santa Clara, 1864–1866
- Santa Clara Zouaves, Unattached Company, 2nd Brigade. Santa Clara, 1863–1865
- Union Guard, Company A, 5th Infantry Regiment, 2nd Brigade. San Jose, 1861–1866

=== Santa Cruz County ===
- Butler Guard, Company G, 5th Infantry Regiment, 2nd Brigade. Santa Cruz, 1863–1866
- Santa Cruz Cavalry, Company F, 1st Cavalry Regiment, 2nd Brigade. Santa Cruz, 1863–1866
- Santa Cruz Volunteers, Company H, 1st Cavalry Regiment, 2nd Brigade. Santa Cruz, 1861
- Watsonville Guard, Company D, 5th Infantry Regiment, 2nd Brigade. Watsonville, 1863–1868

=== Shasta County ===
- Lyon Light Infantry, Company C, 5th Brigade. Shasta, 1863–1868
- Trueman Head Rifles, Company F, 5th Brigade. French Gulch, 1863–1866

=== Sierra County ===
- Allegheny Guard, 3rd Infantry Battalion, 4th Brigade. Allegheny, 1863–1866
- Forest Rifles, Company C, 3rd Infantry Battalion, 2nd Brigade. Forest City 1854–1866
- Gibsonville Blues, Company E, 3rd Infantry Battalion, Second Brigade. Gibsonville, 1858–1862, disbanded after most of its members joined California Volunteer Regiments as individuals.
- La Porte Guard, Unattached Company later Company C, 4th Infantry Battalion, 4th Brigade. La Porte 1863–1866
- Minnesota Guard, Company C, 4th Brigade. Minnesota City, 1863–1866
- Mountain Rangers, Unattached Company, 4th Brigade. Sierraville, 1864–1866
- National Guard, Company E, 1st Battalion, 2nd Brigade. Downieville, 1857–1866
- Sierra Greys, La Porte, 1858–1861 Became Company F, First Regiment of Infantry, California Volunteers
- Table Rock Union Guard, Company G, 7th Infantry Regiment, 4th Brigade. Howland Flat, 1864–1866
- Union Guard, Unattached Company, 4th Brigade. Eureka 1864–1866

=== Siskiyou County ===
- Scott Valley Guard, Unattached Company, 5th Brigade. Scott Valley, 1863, disbanded the same year.
- Siskiyou Light Guard, Company D, 5th Brigade. Yreka, 1863–1866

=== Solono County ===
- Benicia Guard (Starsfield Guard from late 1862), Company G, 2nd Brigade. Benicia, 1862–1866
- Lincoln Artillery, Unattached Company, 2nd Brigade. Vallejo, 1864–1866
- Maine Prairie Rifles, Unattached Company, 2nd Brigade. Maine Prairie, 1863–1866
- McClellan Guard, Company I, 1st Artillery, 2nd Brigade. Vallejo, 1863–1864 Identified as a Copperhead Company its officers were mustered out of service.
- Suisun Cavalry, Company D, 1st Cavalry Regiment, 2nd Brigade. Suisun City, 1863–1866
- Vallejo Rifles, Unattached Company, 2nd Brigade, Vallejo, 1861–1866

=== Sonoma County ===
- Bloomfield Guard, Company C, 1st Infantry Battalion, 2nd Brigade. Bloomfield, 1862–1866
- Emmet Guard (Emmet Rifles after early 1862), Company F, 2nd Infantry Regiment, 2nd Brigade. Petaluma, 1861–1866
- Petaluma City Guard, Company E, 1st Infantry Battalion, 2nd Brigade. Petaluma 1864–1866
- Petaluma Guard, Company D, 1st Infantry Battalion, 2nd Brigade. Petaluma, 1856–1866
- Russian River Rifles, Company B, 1st Infantry Battalion, 2nd Brigade. Healdsburg, 1862–1866
- Sotoyame Guard, Healdsburg, 1858–1861, disbanded in 1861 after a rapid decline in membership, in this pro Southern area.
- Washington Guard, Company A, 1st Infantry Battalion, 2nd Brigade. Santa Rosa, 1862–1866

=== Sutter County ===
- Butte Mountain Rangers, Company D, 7th Infantry Regiment, 4th Brigade. South Butte Mountains, 1863–1866
- Company "A", Yuba City, 1861 Organized but disbanded due to lack of available arms.

=== Stanislaus County ===
- Franklin Guard, Company F, 3rd Infantry Regiment, 3rd Brigade. Knight's Ferry, 1862–1866
- Stanislaus Guard, 1st Brigade, 3rd Division. Knight's Ferry, 1860–1862, disbanded in 1862.

=== Tehama County ===
- Lassen Rangers, Unattached Company, 5th Brigade. Red Bluff, 1863–1866

=== Tuolumne County ===
- Grant Guard, Company G, 1st Infantry Battalion, 3rd Brigade. Shaw's Flat, 1863–1866
- Jamestown Guard, Company D, 1st Infantry Battalion, 3rd Brigade. Jamestown, 1862–1866
- Sigels Guard, Company B, 1st Infantry Battalion, 3rd Brigade. Sonora, 1862–1866
- Tuolumne Guard, Company E, 3rd Infantry Regiment, 3rd Brigade. Montezuma, 1862–1866
- Tuolumne Home Guard, Company A, 3rd Infantry Regiment, 3rd Brigade. Columbia, 1861–1866
- Tuolumne Home Guard, Company C, 3rd Infantry Regiment, 3rd Brigade. Chinese Camp, 1862–1866

=== Trinity County ===
- Douglas City Rifles, Unattached Company, 5th Brigade. Douglas City, 1861–1866
- Halleck Rifles, Unattached Company, 5th Brigade. Weaverville, 1862–1866
- Union Guard, Unattached Company, 2nd Brigade. Weaverville, 1861–1862

=== Tulare County ===
- Tulare Home Guard, Unattached Company, 3rd Brigade. Visalia, 1863–1866

=== Yolo County ===
- Washington Guard, Company G, 4th Infantry Regiment, 4th Brigade. Washington 1863-1866
- Woodland Guard, Company K, 4th Infantry Regiment, 4th Brigade. Woodland, 1863–1866
- Yolo Union Cavalry, Unattached Company, 4th Brigade. Woodland, 1863–1866

=== Yuba County ===
- California Zouaves, 1st Brigade, 5th Division. Marysville 1861–1862
- Downey Guard, Unattached Company, 1st Brigade, 5th Division. Timbuctoo 1860–1861
- Hooker Guard, Company B, 7th Infantry Regiment, 4th Brigade. Oregon House, 1863–1866
- Marysville Rifles, Company B, 4th Infantry Regiment, 4th Brigade. Marysville, 1859–1866
- Saragossa Light Guard, Company H, 7th Infantry, 4th Brigade. Marysville, 1865–1866
- Union Guard, Company A, 7th Infantry Regiment, Fourth Brigade. Marysville, 1863–1866
- Yuba Light Infantry, Unattached Company, 4th Brigade. Camptonville 1863–1866

== Sources ==
- The California State Military Museum, California Militia and National Guard Unit Histories, Index to Militia Units of the State of California 1850–1881
- Inventory of the Military Department. Militia Companies Records, 1849–1880
