= 1st California Veteran Infantry Battalion =

1st Battalion of Veteran Infantry
- National Flag
- Active: November 1864 to September, 1866, December 31, 1866
- Country: United States
- Allegiance: Union
- Branch: Infantry

The 1st Battalion of California Veteran Infantry was a California volunteer infantry battalion in the Union Army during the American Civil War. It spent its entire term of service in the western United States.

== History ==
This battalion was organized at Franklin, Texas, under the command of Major Joseph Smith, (formerly of 5th Regiment California Volunteer Infantry) between November and December 1864, by consolidating the veterans of the 1st Regiment California Volunteer Infantry, into two companies, which became Companies A and B, and consolidating the companies of the 5th Regiment California Volunteer Infantry into five companies, which became Companies C, D, E, F, and G, of the battalion. On March 16, 1865, a Company F was broken up to distribute the men among the other companies, due to the difficulty in obtaining recruits to keep up all the companies to the minimum required by law. The same order directed Colonel Rigg (formerly of the 1st California Infantry) to assume command with the rank of lieutenant-colonel, with headquarters at Fort Craig.

The battalion was mustered out in September 1866. When this battalion was mustered out, the officers and men who wished to be mustered out in California were consolidated into a company, under Captain William F. French, First Lieutenant Robert Edmiston, and Second Lieutenant William Oman and marched to the Presidio, San Francisco, where they arrived December 28, and were "discharged at San Francisco, December 31, 1866, by final muster out of the regiment."

== Commander ==
- Major Joseph Smith, November 1864 – March 16, 1865
- Lieutenant Colonel Edwin A. Rigg, March 16, 1865 – September 20, 1866

== Company assignments ==
- Headquarters: Franklin, Texas November 1864 - February 1866. Mustered out at Los Pinos, New Mexico, September 20, 1866.
- Company A: Mustered out at Fort Union, New Mexico, September 9, 1866.
- Company B: Garrison at Fort Cummings, April 1865 - August 1866, Mustered out at Los Pinos, N. M., September 15, 1866.
- Company C: Mustered out at Santa Fe, N. M., September 17, 1866.
- Company D: Mustered out at Los Pinos, N. M., September 15, 1866.
- Company E: Mustered out at Los Pinos, N. M., September 15, 1866.
- Company F: Formed at Las Cruces, New Mexico, November 30, 1864. Disbanded at Fort Cummings, March 16, 1865. Soldiers distributed to other companies.
- Company G: Mustered out at Los Pinos, N. M., September 15, 1866.
  - January 1866. While six men of the company were performing daily duty—cutting wood for this garrison at Oak Grove, about five miles distant, on the seventeenth instant—they were surprised and fired upon by Apache Indians. The number of Indians was estimated at about forty or more. Four men were killed, and two escaped — Privates John H. Matthews and Nathaniel B. Goldsberry, the latter with an arrow wound in his hip. Private Matthews displayed exemplary courage in defending himself, as well as virtually saving the life of Goldsberry, who was scarcely able to render any defense. One Indian was killed and indications showed others wounded.

== See also ==
- List of California Civil War Union units
