= Cooke's Spring, New Mexico =

Coordinates: 32°27′46″N 107°38′55″W

Cooke's Spring, or Cookes Spring, is a spring in Luna County, New Mexico at an elevation of 4839 feet. Cooke's Spring is located at the eastern mouth of the narrow upper Cooke's Canyon, part of what was called Cooke's Pass, a narrow gap, running east and west, through the Cooke's Range.

== History ==
Cooke's Spring was named for Philip St. George Cooke, 2nd U.S. Dragoons, the commander of the Mormon Battalion, that camped at the spring on November 16, 1846, while Cooke's command was exploring and building what became known as Cooke's Wagon Road, a wagon road to San Diego, California from Santa Fe, New Mexico. The spring was the only large supply of fresh water between the Rio Grande and the Mimbres River for travelers on the Southern Immigrant Trail. Wagon trains heading to California as well as the later San Antonio-San Diego Mail Line and Butterfield Overland Mail used it. The Cooke's Spring Station of the Butterfield Overland Mail stage route was located near Cooke's Spring from 1858 to 1861.

Near the end of the American Civil War, Fort Cummings was established near the spring and stage station to protect travelers along the stage route and as a base of operations in the Apache Wars in the following decades.
