= Fryingpan Canyon =

Valley in the Cookes Range, Luna County, New Mexico

Fryingpan Canyon, a valley in the Cookes Range, in Luna County, New Mexico. Its mouth lies at 4715 feet (1437m), at its confluence with Starvation Draw. Its source lies at 5560 feet, at 32°28′50″N 107°41′28″W, in the Cookes Range, on the east slope of Rattlesnake Ridge at its eastern end.
