= Battle of Apache Pass =

1862 battle of the Apache Wars in Arizona, United States

Coordinates: 32.157°N 109.453°W

- Part of the Apache Wars and the Trans-Mississippi Theater of the American Civil War
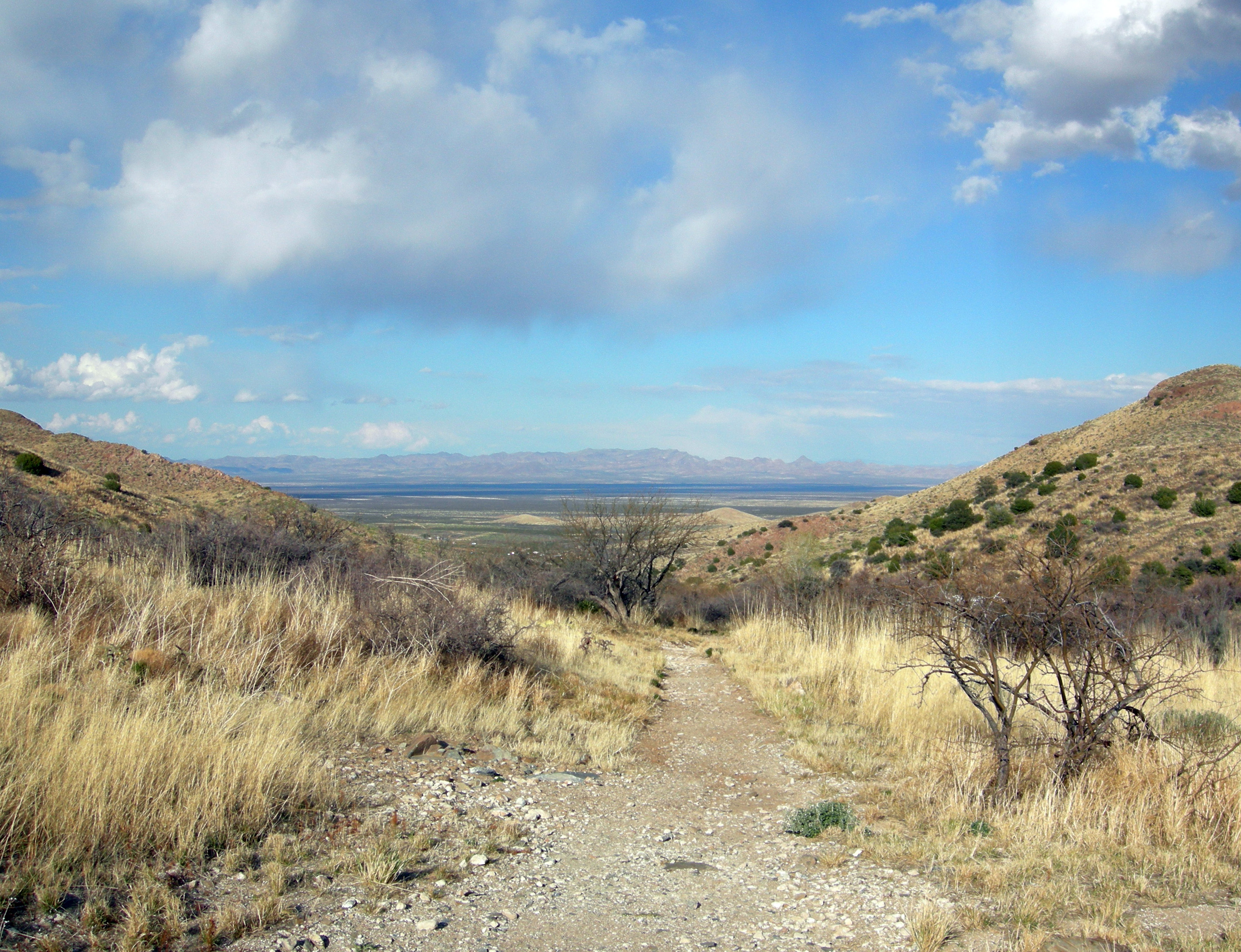
- Apache Pass
Date	July 15–16, 1862
Location	Apache Pass, New Mexico Territory (US), Arizona Territory (CSA); Present Day: Cochise County, Arizona
Result	United States victory

Belligerents
United States	Apache

Commanders and leaders
(United States) Thomas L. Roberts	Mangas Coloradas; Cochise

Strength
116 infantry 22 cavalry 2 artillery pieces	~200 warriors

Casualties and losses
2 killed 3 wounded	Apache claimed 63 warriors were killed by artillery and 3 by small arms.
- Nine civilians were killed before the battle just outside Apache Pass, prompting Colonel Carleton to build Fort Bowie.

The Battle of Apache Pass was fought in 1862 at Apache Pass, Arizona, in the United States, between Apache warriors and the Union volunteers of the California Column. It was one of the largest battles between the Americans and the Chiricahua during the Apache Wars.

== Background ==
In early 1862 Col. James H. Carleton sent units from Fort Yuma to Tucson, Arizona, which had recently been occupied by a Confederate force, Company A, Arizona Rangers. After a small engagement known as the Battle of Picacho Pass just north of Tucson between a detachment of Carleton's cavalry and Confederate pickets, the Union forces advanced on Tucson in three columns. They arrived in Tucson on May 20, forcing the heavily outnumbered Confederate garrison to withdraw to Texas without a fight.

After capturing Confederate Arizona's western outpost, Carleton prepared to march east with his main body in July, intending to enter New Mexico through Apache Pass in southeast Arizona. To prepare for the advance of his main force, he sent a column ahead as he had on his march from Yuma to Tucson. The column was led by Capt. Thomas L. Roberts of Company E, 1st California Infantry, accompanied by two 12-pounder mountain howitzers under the command of Sgt. James D. Monihon, a 22-man cavalry escort from Company B, 2nd Regiment California Volunteer Cavalry, led by Capt. John C. Cremony and 21 wagons plus 242 mules and horses.

After Roberts reached the San Pedro River, he needed to learn whether Dragoon Springs, 28 miles further east, could supply both companies with water or if they would need to separate into smaller detachments. Capt. Roberts led the advance detachment with his infantry company, joined by three wagons, the howitzers and seven of Cremony's best horsemen to serve as scouts and couriers. Capt. Cremony remained behind with 15 cavalrymen and ten of Roberts' infantrymen, including the detachment left as a garrison at the river, where an adobe stage station building provided shelter and a defensive position to guard the remaining wagons and animals.

Roberts determined the water at Dragoon Springs was enough to support the entire force, and Cremony joined with him the next day. Together they advanced on the springs at Apache Pass in the same manner, leaving Cremony with the guard detachment.

== Battle ==
At noon on July 15, Roberts' detachment entered Apache Pass. After traveling about two-thirds of the way through, his force was attacked by about 500 Apache warriors led by Mangas Coloradas and Cochise (Geronimo claimed to have fought in this battle but this has not been confirmed).

The Union soldiers were in a difficult position. The infantrymen had walked dozens of miles across the hot Arizona desert, heading for the spring at Apache Pass, which was now blocked to them by the well-armed Chiricahua warriors. Low on water and realizing a retreat back to Tucson without water could cost him many men, Roberts chose to fight. The Apaches had thrown up defenses consisting of several breastworks made of stone. They had also surprised the invaders with an ambush, waiting until the soldiers came within 30–80 yards of their positions before opening fire. At first the Union troops could barely see their attackers. After a few minutes of intense combat Roberts ordered a retreat and his force withdrew to the mouth of Apache Pass. His men regrouped and unlimbered the mountain howitzers for an advance against the Apaches.

This was one of the first times the United States Army had been able to use artillery against the Indians in the Southwest. Roberts ordered his infantry to take the hills overlooking the pass, while he remained in the pass to direct the artillery support. The skirmishers moved forward, where they were able to take cover in an abandoned Butterfield Overland Mail station. The soldiers were now about 600 yards from the spring. Overlooking the spring were two hills; one on the east, the other on the south. The Apache riflemen behind the breastworks on the hills were delivering a deadly fire against the attackers.

Roberts advanced with his howitzers and had them open fire. Their effectiveness was limited by the fact that they were 300–400 feet below the Apache defenses. Roberts moved his guns ahead to a better position even though they were under fire. Once the guns were in effective range, the artillery opened fire in earnest. The Apaches held their positions until nightfall, when they fled, allowing the Union troops to reach the spring. After allowing his tired men to enjoy a meal, Roberts retreated to bring up Cremony's detachment. The next morning the Apaches returned, but they fled once the artillery opened fire on them.

== Aftermath ==
Two of Capt. Roberts' men were killed and three wounded in the battle for the spring. According to a report Col. Carleton made to Col. Richard C. Drum on September 20, 1862, about 10 Apaches were killed.

From the hostile attitude of the Chiricahua, I found it indispensably necessary to establish a post in what is known as Apache Pass; it is known as Fort Bowie, and garrisoned by one hundred rank and file of the Fifth Infantry, California Volunteers, and thirteen rank and file of Company A, First Cavalry, California Volunteers; this post commands the water in that pass. Around this water the Indians have been in the habit of lying in ambush, and shooting the troops and travelers as they came to drink. In this way they have killed three of Lieutenant-Colonel Eyre's command, and in attempting to keep Captain Roberts' company, First Infantry, California Volunteers, away from the spring a fight ensued, in which Captain Roberts had two men killed and two wounded. Captain Roberts reports that the Indians lost ten killed. In this affair the men of Captain Roberts' company are reported as behaving with great gallantry.

According to Capt. Cremony, however, a prominent Apache who was present in the engagement had said that 63 warriors were killed by the artillery, while only three died from small-arms fire. Said the unnamed Apache, "We would have done well enough if you had not fired wagons at us." The howitzers, being on wheels, were called wagons by the Apaches, who were unfamiliar with artillery tactics. Mangas Coloradas himself was wounded in the action, having been shot in the chest when attempting to kill one of Roberts' cavalry scouts.

One day after the battle, on the New Mexico side of Apache Pass, the bodies of nine scalped white civilians were found. Carleton decided that it was necessary to establish a post at the pass to prevent settlers from being ambushed as they passed through it. On August 4 the first units of the California Column reached Mesilla, New Mexico, along the Rio Grande. At the same time the last remnants of the Confederate army withdrew to Texas.

The 5th California Infantry was ordered to build a fort in Apache Pass, calling it Fort Bowie in honor of their colonel, George Washington Bowie. Carleton was placed in command of the Union's Department of New Mexico, and he continued to campaign against the Apaches in that area.

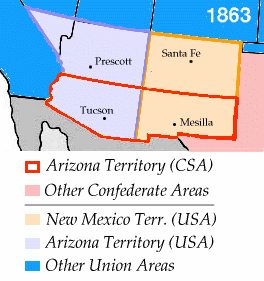
Arizona and New Mexico during the American Civil War.

Today the battlefield and fort are preserved in Fort Bowie National Historic Site. The engagement was portrayed, somewhat inaccurately, in the 1952 film The Battle at Apache Pass.

== See also ==
- New Mexico Campaign
- Bear Spring House, Guardhouse, and Spring
