= Mounted Volunteers (Humboldt Co.) =

Mounted Volunteers; 2nd Brigade of the California State Militia was organized in Humboldt County, California on 9 September 1861.

The company of Mounted Volunteers was mustered to protect citizens and property from hostile Indians during the Bald Hills War. In three months, the Indians were controlled and placed on the Federal Reservation on the Smith River and the company was mustered out.

== See also ==
- List of California State Militia civil war units
