= Stockton Blues =

The Stockton Blues was a California state militia unit organized in 1857 and disbanded in 1861 due to secessionist dissension. Union men then reformed under the Stockton Union Guard, 1861–1866.

== See also ==
- List of California State Militia civil war units
