= Fort Bowie =

19th-century US Army outpost in Arizona

- Apache Pass, Arizona, US
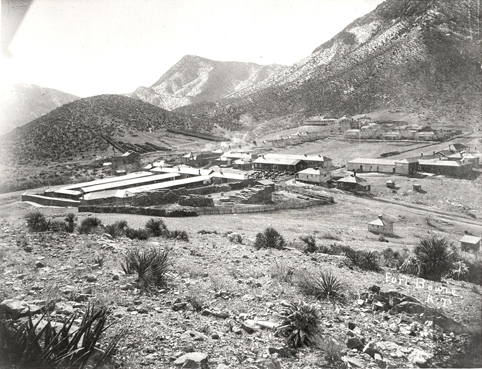
- Fort Bowie in 1893

Site information
- Type: Army fortification
- Controlled by: Arizona
- Condition: tourist attraction

Site history
- Built: 1864
- In use: 1862–1894

Garrison information
- Occupants: United States Army

Fort Bowie was a 19th-century outpost of the United States Army located in southeastern Arizona near the present day town of Willcox, Arizona. The remaining buildings and site are now protected as Fort Bowie National Historic Site.

Fort Bowie was established by the California Volunteers in 1862, after a series of engagements between the California Column and the Chiricahua Apaches. The most violent of these conflicts was the Battle of Apache Pass in July 1862. The fort was named in honor of Colonel George Washington Bowie commander of the 5th Regiment California Volunteer Infantry who first established the fort. The first Fort Bowie resembled a temporary camp rather than a permanent army post. In 1868, a second, more substantial Fort Bowie was built which included adobe barracks, houses, corrals, a trading post, and a hospital. The second Fort Bowie was built on a plateau about 500 yards (460 m) to the east of the first site. For more than 30 years Fort Bowie and Apache Pass were the focal point of military operations eventually culminating in the surrender of Geronimo in 1886 and the banishment of the Chiricahuas to Florida and Alabama. The fort was abandoned in 1894.

== History ==
There were two engagements between the United States Army and the Chiricahua that led to the construction of Fort Bowie in 1862. The first engagement, known as the Bascom Affair, took place in January 1861 when a band of Apaches raided the ranch of John Ward. Ward mistakenly believed that Cochise and the Chiricahua Apaches were responsible for the raid and demanded that the military take action against Cochise to recover property stolen during the raid. The next month, the army responded to Ward's request by sending Lieutenant George Nicholas Bascom and fifty-four men to Apache Pass to confront Cochise. Bascom managed to capture Cochise and threatened to hold him hostage until Ward's property was returned but the Apache leader managed to escape. Sporadic fighting between Cochise's warriors and Army troops would continue for years to come.

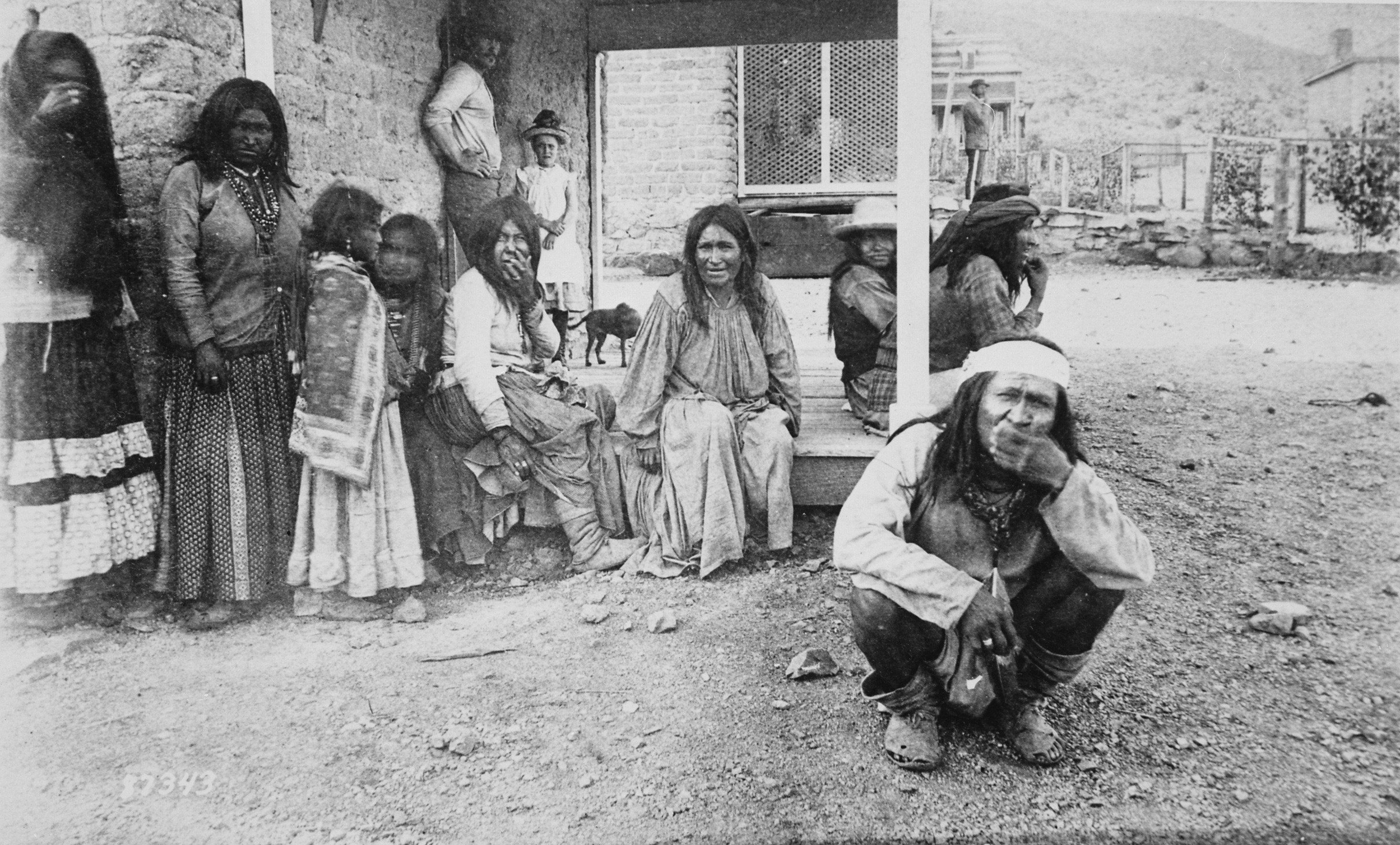
Apache prisoners at Fort Bowie, 1884

The second major engagement was the Battle of Apache Pass, fought from July 15 to July 16, 1862. A Union regiment under Brigadier General James Henry Carleton was ambushed by a band of Apaches while en route from California to New Mexico where they were to confront Confederate troops. This battle led to the eventual establishment of Fort Bowie in order to protect Apache Pass and an important source of water, Apache Spring. Construction on the first Fort Bowie began in 1862 but this resembled a temporary camp rather than a permanent military fort. In 1868, a second, more substantial Fort Bowie was built on a plateau about 500 yards (460 m) to the east. For more than 30 years Fort Bowie and Apache Pass were the focal point of military operations eventually culminating in the surrender of Geronimo in 1886 and the banishment of the Chiricahuas to Florida and Alabama. The fort was abandoned in 1894.

=== Commanders ===
- Major Theodore H. Coult July 1862 – September 1862
- Captain Hugh L. Hinds September 1862 – May 1863

=== Garrisons of Fort Bowie ===
- Company G, 5th California Infantry. July 1862 – January 1863
- Company E, 5th California Infantry. January 1863 – May 1863
- Company K, 5th California Infantry. May 1864 – September 1864
- ?
- Company L, 1st California Cavalry. June 1865 – January 1866
- ?
- Company L, 1st California Cavalry. March 1866 – April 1866

== Demographics ==
Historical population
Census	Pop.	Note	%±
1870	400		—
1880	184		−54.0%
U.S. Decennial Census

Fort Bowie first reported on the 1870 U.S. Census as "Apache Pass". It featured 400 residents, all White. It tied with Adamsville for the distinction of the 4th largest community in the Arizona Territory. At the time, it was located in Pima County. In 1880, it reported as "Camp Bowie" with 184 residents (the racial demographics were not reported). In 1881, Fort Bowie was drawn into the newly created county of Cochise. Although Fort Bowie was still in existence as an active U.S. Army facility, it did not report a population for 1890. It would be formally closed down 4 years later. It has not reported on the census to date.

== Fort Bowie today ==
Fort Bowie National Historic Site
- IUCN category III (natural monument or feature)
- Location within Arizona Location within the United States
- Location: Cochise County, Arizona, United States
- Nearest city: Bowie, Arizona
- Coordinates: 32°08′46″N 109°26′08″W
- Area: 999.45 acres (404.46 ha)
- Established: July 29, 1972
- Visitors: 8,739 (in 2025)
- Governing body: National Park Service
- Website: Fort Bowie National Historic Site
- Fort Bowie and Apache Pass
- U.S. National Register of Historic Places
- U.S. National Historic Landmark
- Built: 1862
- NRHP reference No.: 72000194

Significant dates
- Added to NRHP: July 29, 1972
- Designated NHL: December 19, 1960

The Fort Bowie and Apache Pass site was declared a National Historic Landmark in 1960.

The remains of Fort Bowie are carefully preserved, as are the adobe walls of various post buildings and the ruins of a Butterfield Stage Station. The site is located on the unpaved Apache Pass Road which can be accessed from Interstate 10 near Bowie, Arizona or from Arizona Highway 186 just north of the entrance to Chiricahua National Monument. Access to the ruins of Fort Bowie and the visitor center is via a 1.5-mile (2.4 km) foot trail which begins at a parking area along Apache Pass Road. This trail to the old fort passes other historic sites such as Apache Spring, Siphon Canyon, the ruins of the Butterfield Stage Stop and Bascom's Camp.

US Army soldier Orizoba Spence, who received the Medal of Honor during the Indian Wars, is buried in the post cemetery

In 1958 a Western entitled Fort Bowie was made, starring Ben Johnson. The film charted one of the disputes between the US Cavalry based at the fort and the Apaches.

== Gallery ==
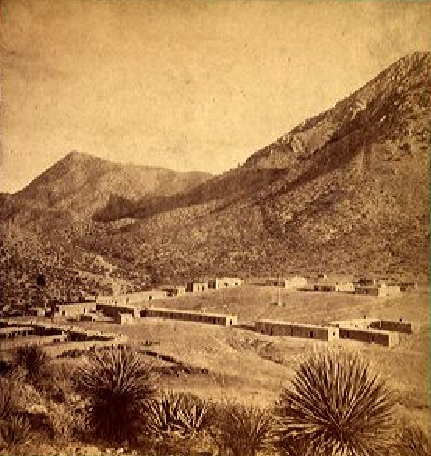
Fort Bowie, circa 1880.

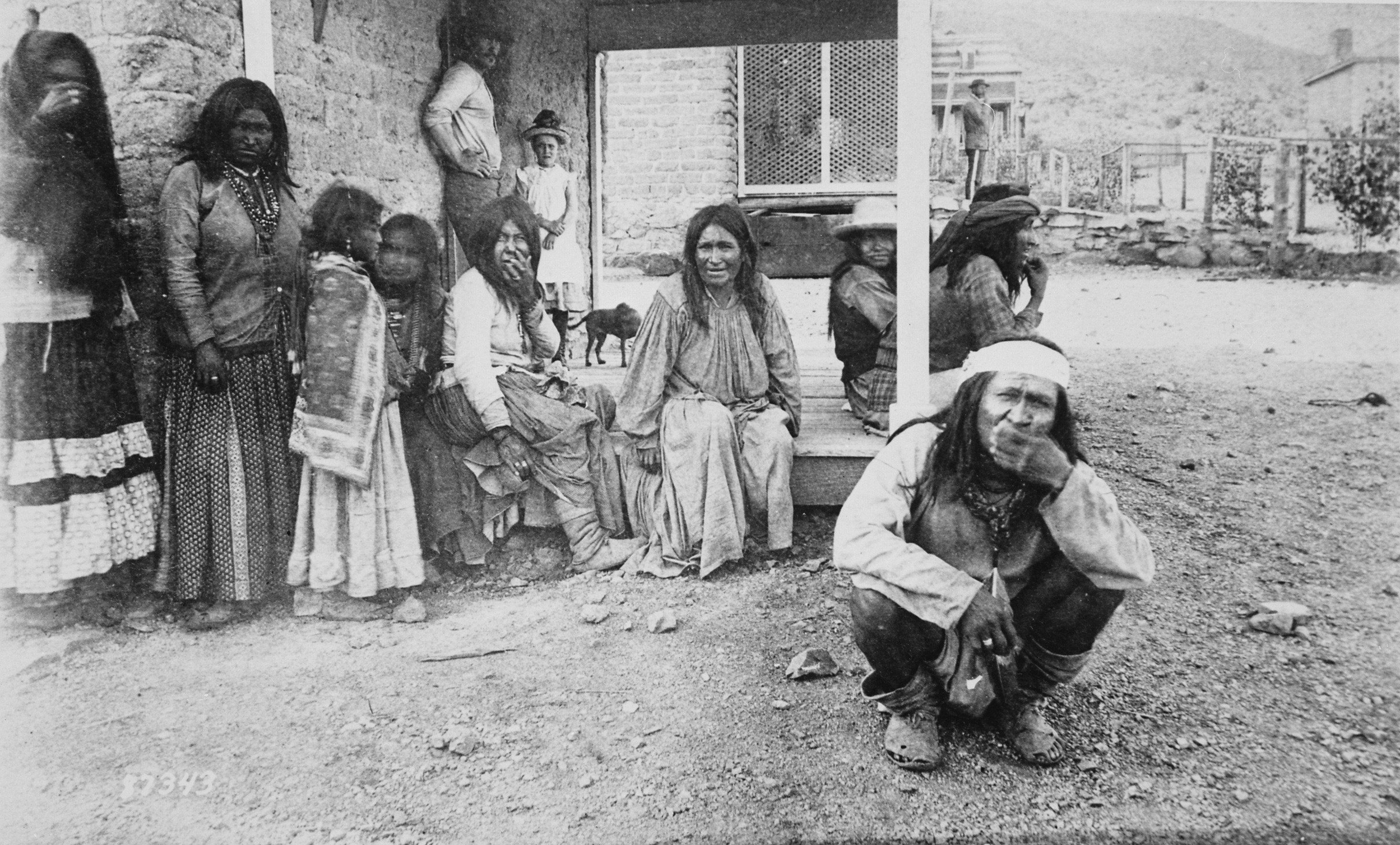
Apache prisoners at Fort Bowie, 1884

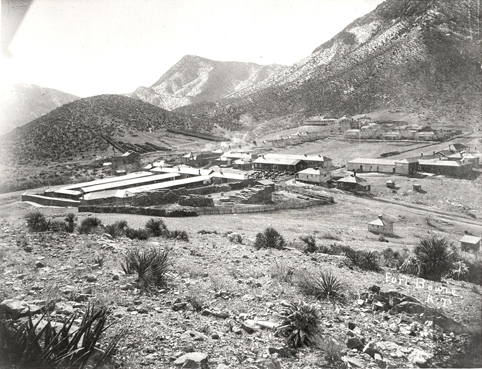
Fort Bowie in 1893.

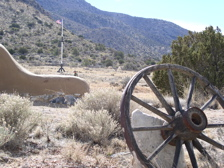
Present day ruins of Fort Bowie.

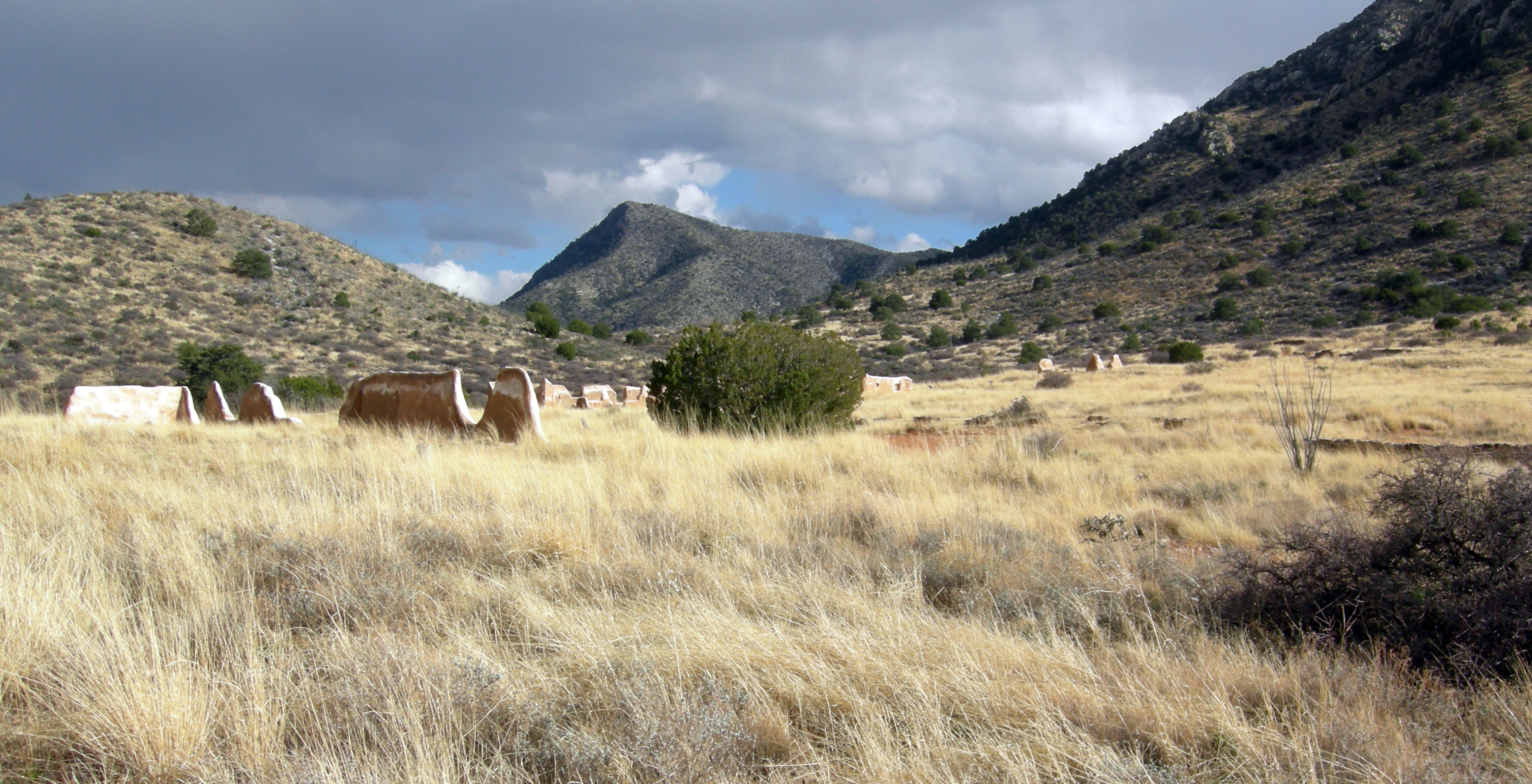
Fort Bowie site today.

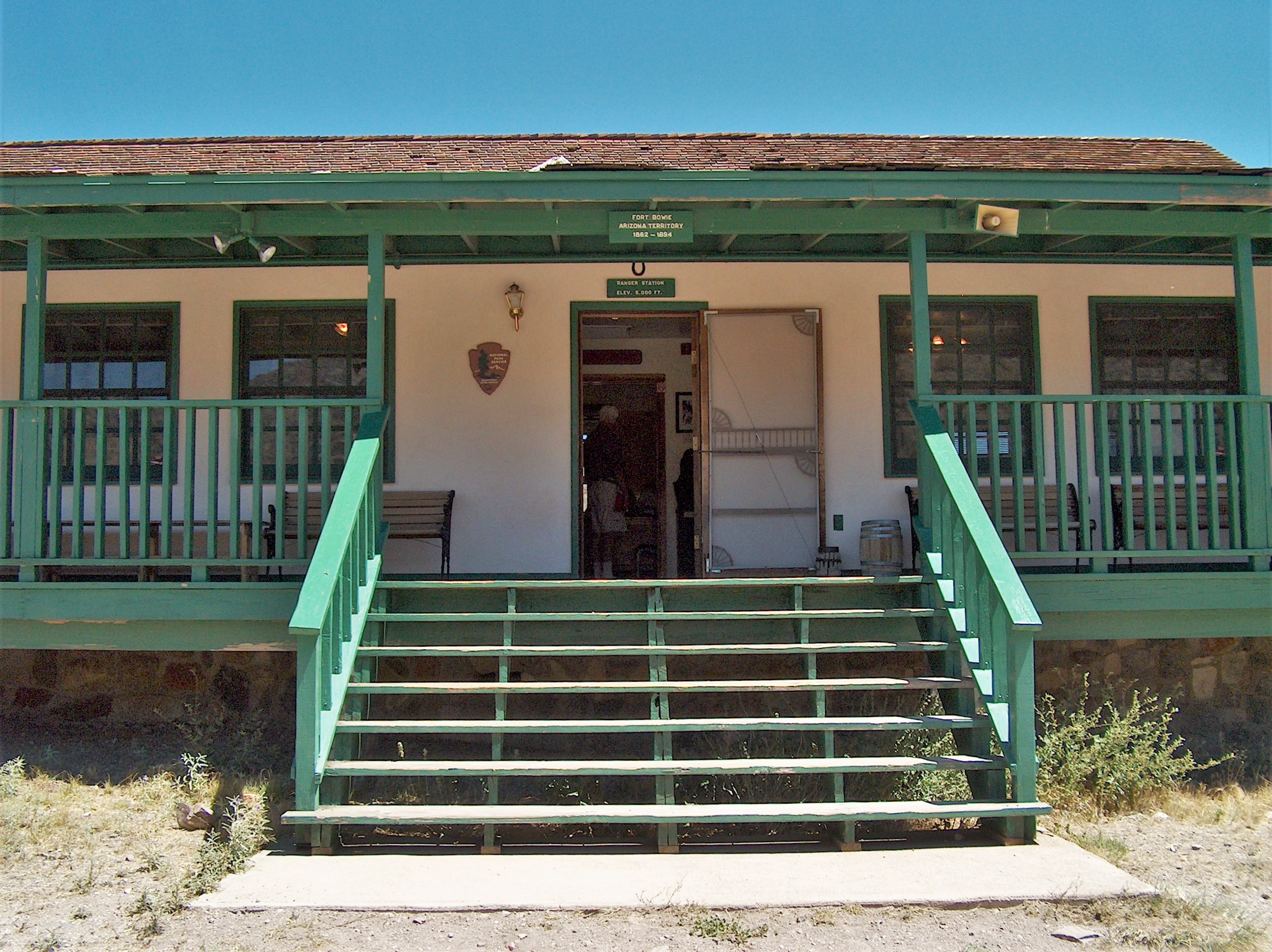
Fort Bowie Ranger Station and museum

== See also ==
- Bear Spring House, Guardhouse, and Spring
