= Bear Spring House, Guardhouse, and Spring =

- U.S. National Register of Historic Places
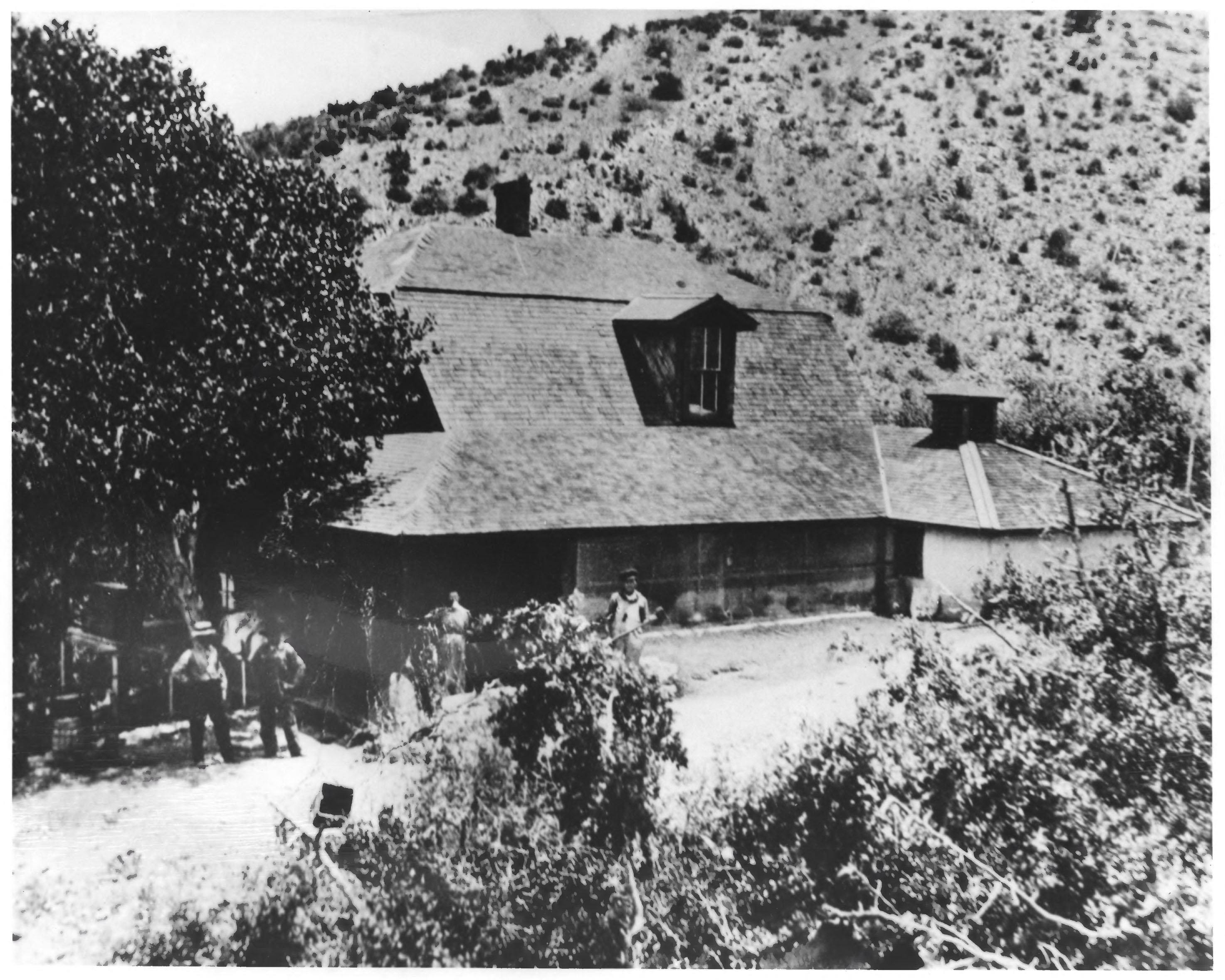
- Bear Spring house, ca. 1915

- Location within Arizona Location within the United States
- Location: Bowie, Arizona
- Coordinates: 32°08′22″N 109°25′34″W
- NRHP reference No.: 83002985
- Added to NRHP: March 18, 1983

The Bear Spring House, Guardhouse, and Spring is a late 19th century ranch situated in the Chiricahua Mountains in Cochise County, Arizona

== History ==
Apache Pass is a pass in the Chiricahua Mountains. During the mid and late 1800s, it became a point of contention between European settlers and the Chiricahua Apache, as it was at a crossroad in the region, as well as being the site of a freshwater spring. In 1857, the Butterfield Overland Mail Stage Line established a station in the pass. In 1862, the Battle of Apache Pass took place, after which Fort Bowie was established on July 28, 1862. The spring in the pass supplied all the water for the fort initially, but by 1874, more water was needed, and nearby Bear Spring was selected. A stone reservoir was created to store water, which was pumped into water wagons and trucked to the fort. In 1874 an adobe guardhouse was constructed.

In 1884–85, a 5,000 foot pipeline was laid between the reservoir and the fort, using two-inch pump and a hydraulic ram. The two-inch line was replaced with a four-inch line in 1889. In 1894 Fort Bowie was abandoned. That year, James and Hester (Bausman) Dickson began construction on the farm house, on land which included the guardhouse, the reservoir, and another small defensive bunker. They had 8 children. The house was two-story, with four dormer windows. The windows were salvaged from the home of the fort's commander, Colonel E. B. Beaumont, and many of the other building materials were also scrounged from the fort. James died in 1917 and in 1918 L. A. Knape purchased the property from Dickson family, he added large tracts of the surrounding land, turning it into a cattle ranch, which was sold in 1934. Since then it has seen several different owners.

== Description of the site ==
The ranch is located in the remote high-desert among the northern foothills of the Chiricahua Mountains in Cochise County in southeastern Arizona. The site consists of the ranch house, a guardhouse, a stone-lined reservoir and spring. The guardhouse, spring, reservoir, and the adobe bunker which was incorporated into the ranch house, all date from the period when Fort Bowie was in operation, while the remainder of the farmhouse was built after the fort was abandoned. Portions of the hydraulic ram system also remain.

=== The house ===
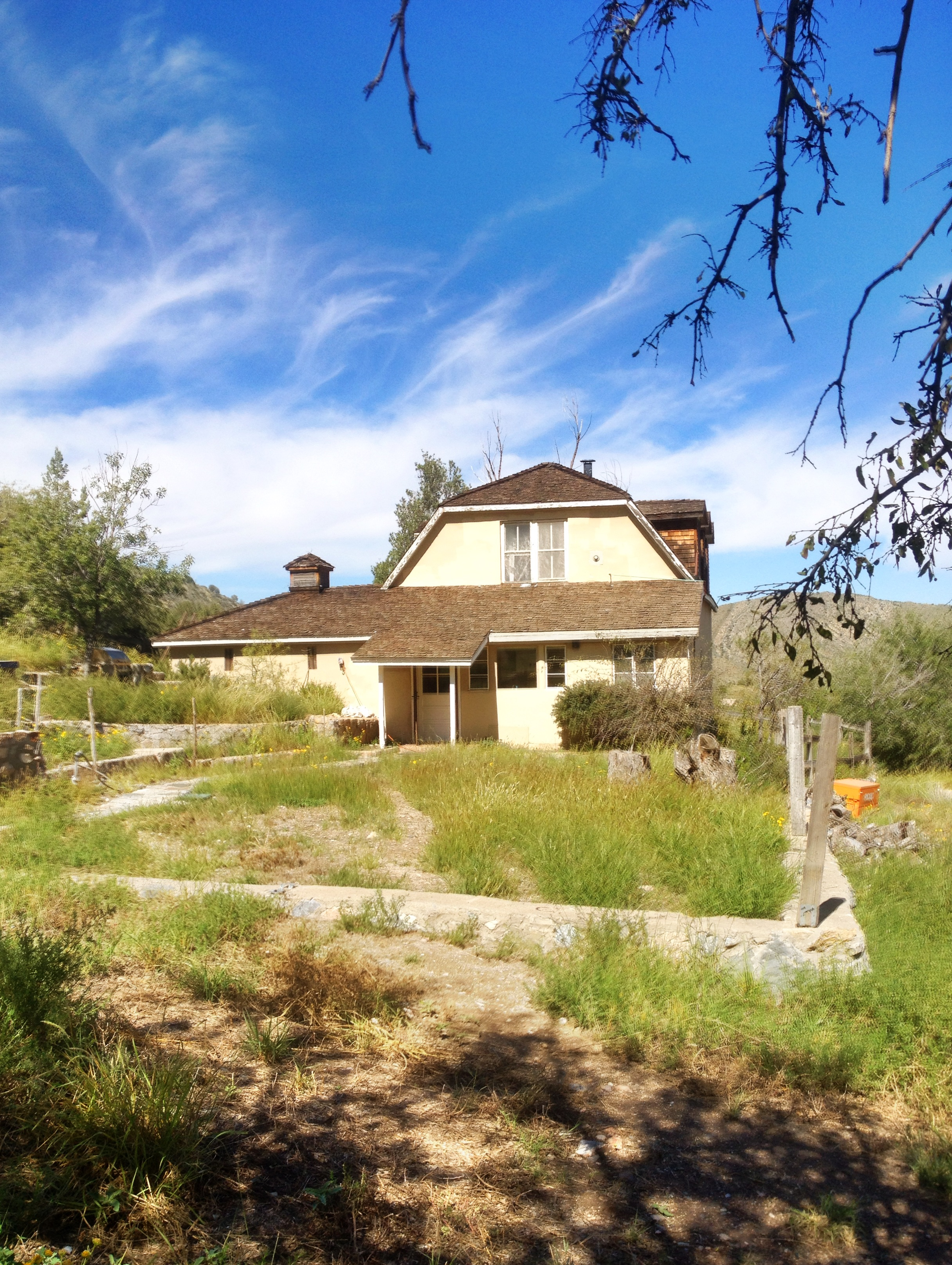
Bear Spring House, 2014

The original house was built in 1894, and is a plastered, two-story adobe building. As described in the National Park Service's (NPS) nomination form, "The upper story consisting of a clipped gambrel roof sheathed with wood shingles. Three gable dormers project from the front roof slope, and there is a single dormer centered on the west slope. The roof is framed with sawn 2x4 rafters and longitudinally sawn stringers with the bark remaining. Square nails are found throughout. Tin flashing on all ridges and valleys is also intact. The dormers were taken intact from the Commanding Officer's residence at Fort Bowie." The structure is 33'x42' with adobe walls.

The NPS document continues: "The main block intersects with the bunker at the SW corner. The bunker is a small (14'x14') adobe structure built partially below grade. This was one of a series of identical outposts constructed around the fort for defensive purposes. Stone retaining walls serve as a foundation for the upper adobe walls. The walls are surmounted by a timber-framed plank roof overlain by a six-inch dirt layer. Small vertical window openings resembling rifle ports are cut into the north and south walls. Later construction of the main residence incorporated this bunker as an ell. The doorway of the bunker presently opens onto the south veranda of the house. The bunker's parapet walls were removed to accommodate a frame hip roof which became integral with the veranda roof. The interior displays a simple floor plan with the main entry being through paired French doors beneath the west veranda. At the east end of the main living space is a fireplace bordered by colored Mexican ceramic tiles installed in 1928. Two-inch, tongue-and-groove oak boards imported from a Louisiana lumber mill were used for flooring on the first floor. Six-inch pine boards on exposed joists serve as the ceiling and attic floor."

=== The guardhouse and reservoir ===
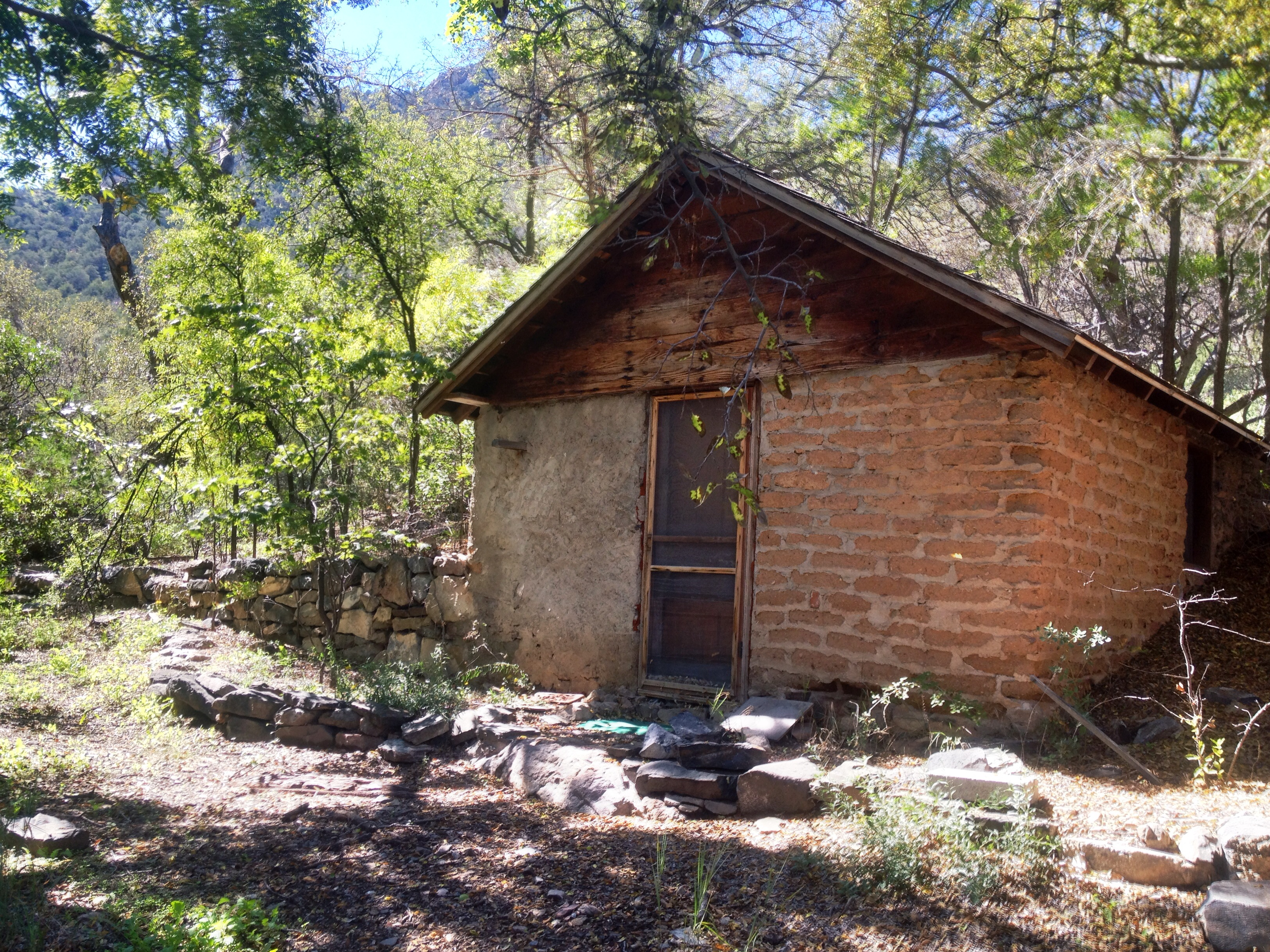
Bear spring guardhouse, 2014

The guardhouse sits on a stone foundation, with adobe and stone walls. It has a gable roof with wood shingles. Most of the building is below grade, with only the eastern wall above grade, as it faces the spring. Bear Spring is still an active spring, from an underground aquifer source. The stone-lined reservoir measures 20 feet by 20 feet, and is the original structure constructed in 1874 by the army stationed at the nearby fort. However, of the original 5000 foot pipeline still in existence is a 40-foot length of pipe running from the reservoir to just beyond the guardhouse.

== See also ==
- Fort Bowie
- Battle of Apache Pass
