= Starvation Draw =

Valley in the Cookes Range, in Luna County, New Mexico

Starvation Draw, a valley in the Cookes Range, in Luna County, New Mexico. Its mouth lies at an elevation of 4291 feet (1308m). Its source lies at an elevation of 5800 feet, at 32°29′43″N 107°42′35″W, in the Cookes Range, on the south slope of Rattlesnake Ridge.
