= List of Union units from California in the American Civil War =

== California State Volunteer Units 1861–1866 ==
The following are California State Volunteer Units that were active between 1861 and 1866 serving in the Union Army, most west of the Rocky Mountains in place of Federal troops:

California	Notes
1st California Cavalry Regiment	May 16, 1863 – October 19, 1866
2nd California Cavalry Regiment	October 18, 1861 – July 12, 1866
1st California Infantry Regiment	February 12, 1862 – October 21, 1866
2nd California Infantry Regiment	December 30, 1862 – July 2, 1866
3rd California Infantry Regiment	December 31, 1861 – July 27, 1866
4th California Infantry Regiment	October 1861 – April 18, 1866
5th California Infantry Regiment	November 1861 – December 14, 1864
6th California Infantry Regiment	October 21, 1862 – December 20, 1865
7th California Infantry Regiment	December 1864 – June 28, 1866
8th California Infantry Regiment	November 17, 1864 – October 24, 1865
1st California Cavalry Battalion	March 1863 – April 2, 1866
1st California Infantry Battalion (Veteran)	November 1864 – September 1866
1st California Mountaineers Battalion	March 16, 1864 – June 14, 1865

== California Brigade ==
In 1861 four infantry regiments were recruited in Pennsylvania by Oregon Senator Edward D. Baker. Though made up of Pennsylvanians they were attributed to California. After the Battle of Ball's Bluff in October 1861 the brigade was renamed Philadelphia Brigade and the regiments were attributed to Pennsylvania as well.

- 1st California Infantry Regiment - 71st Pennsylvania Infantry Regiment
- 2nd California Infantry Regiment - 69th Pennsylvania Infantry Regiment
- 3rd California Infantry Regiment - 72nd Pennsylvania Infantry Regiment
- 5th California Infantry Regiment - 106th Pennsylvania Infantry Regiment

== State militia ==
- California State Militia units

== See also ==
- California Civil War Confederate Units
- Lists of American Civil War Regiments by State
- California in the American Civil War

== Bibliography ==
- Dyer, Frederick H. (1959). A Compendium of the War of the Rebellion. New York and London. Thomas Yoseloff, Publisher. LCCN 59-12963.
- The War of the Rebellion: a compilation of the official records of the Union and Confederate armies, Volume 27, Part 1, Chapter LXII. Operations on the Pacific Coast, January 1,1861 – June 30, 1862, United States. War Dept.
- The War of the Rebellion: Volume 35, Part 1; CORRESPONDENCE, ORDERS, AND RETURNS RELATING TO OPERATIONS ON THE PACIFIC COAST FROM JULY 1, 1862, TO JUNE 30, 1865. By United States. War Dept, Robert Nicholson Scott, Henry Martyn WASHINGTON: GOVERNMENT PRINTING OFFICE. 1897
- Records of California men in the war of the rebellion 1861 to 1867, California. Adjutant General's Office, SACRAMENTO: State Office, J. D. Young, Supt. State Printing. 1890.
