= 5th California Infantry Regiment =

5th California Volunteer Infantry
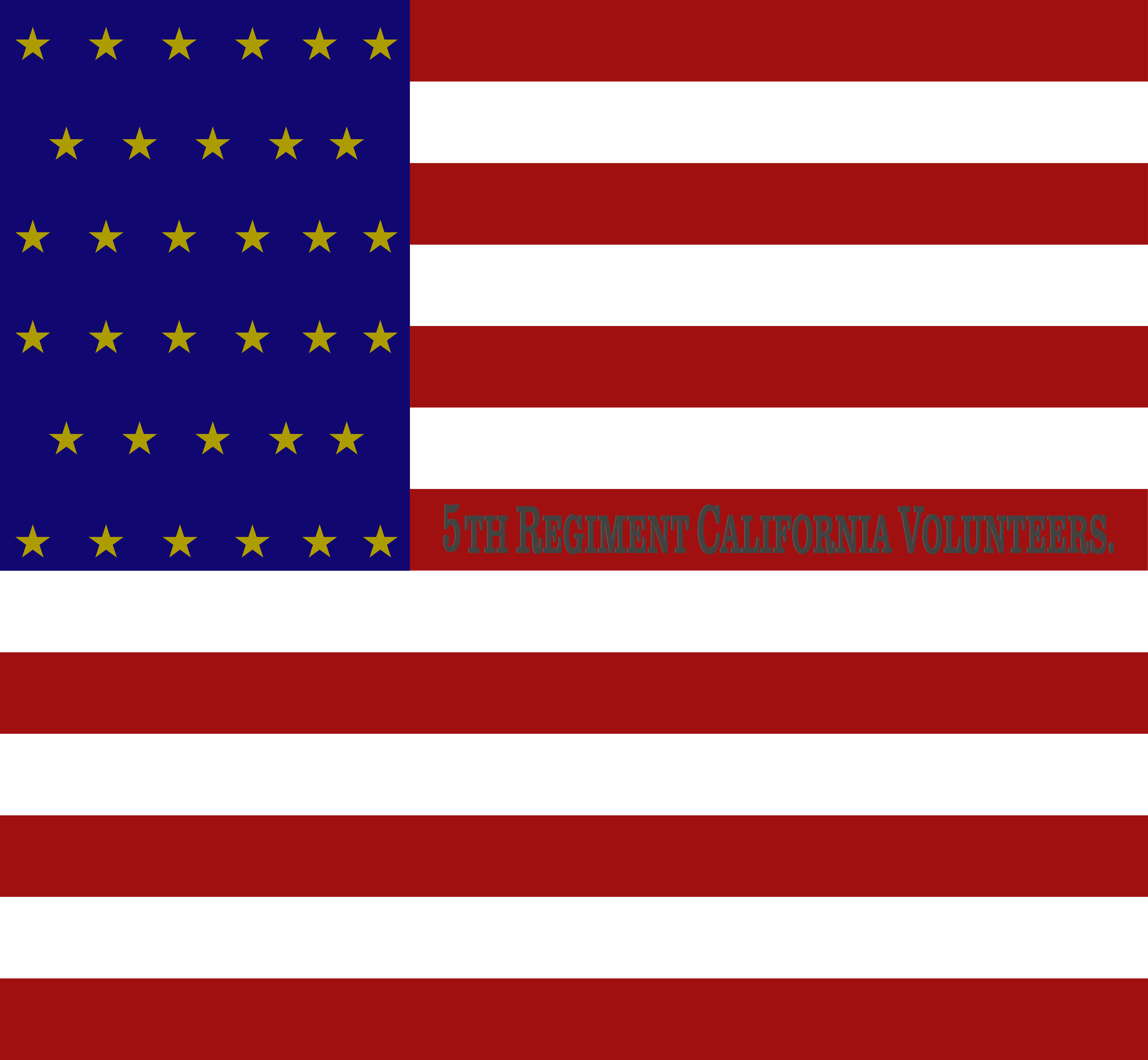
- National color of the regiment
- Active: September 12, 1861, to December 14, 1864
- Country: United States
- Allegiance: Union
- Branch: Infantry
- Engagements: American Civil War: Battle of Mount Gray; Battle of Pecos River; First Battle of Adobe Walls

The 5th Regiment California Volunteer Infantry was an infantry regiment in the Union Army during the American Civil War. It spent its entire term of service in the western United States, attached to the Department of the Pacific and Department of New Mexico.

== Commanders ==
- Colonel John Kellogg (U.S. Army) September 1861 - November 8, 1861
- Colonel George W. Bowie (U.S. Volunteers) November 8, 1861 - December 1864.

== Flags ==
On 18 February 1862, two flags were given to the regiment at Camp Union. They was made by Daniel Norcross a local San Francisco sign painter. The work took a couple of weeks and cost of between $200-$300. One was the Stars and Stripes and the other was described as a "Bear Flag."

When Company E was stationed at Sacramento they received a beautiful silk flag. It bore white background with an inscription in blue: "Company E, Fifth Regiment California Volunteers.” In the center of the field. With a golden fringe around the whole banner. The flag was made in Michigan Bar, California.

In November of 1861 Company C was given an “appropriate flag” by the Ladies' Association of Grass Valley.

In January, 1863 Company G was handed the Stars and Stripes.

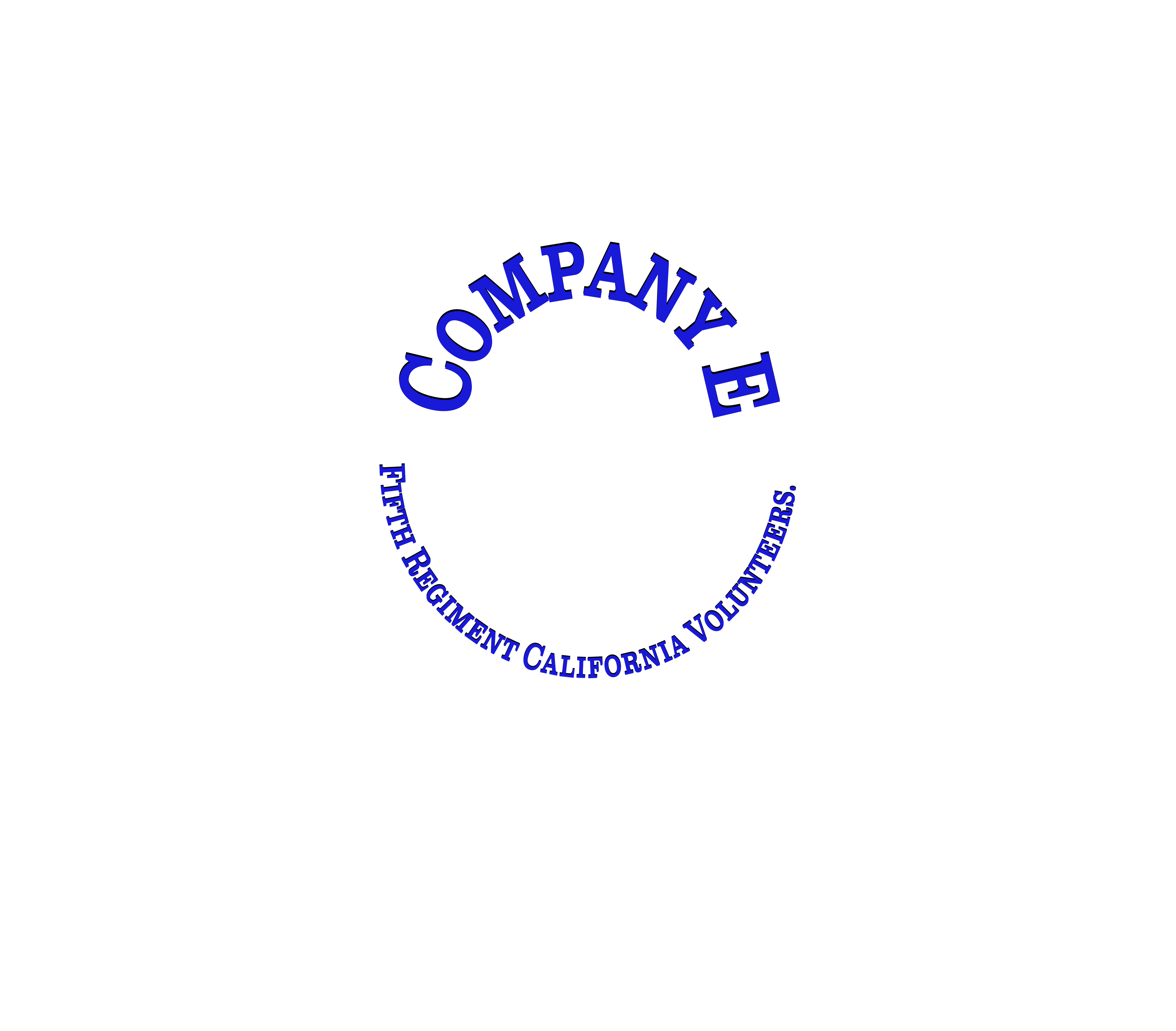
Digital reconstruction of the flag carried by Company E

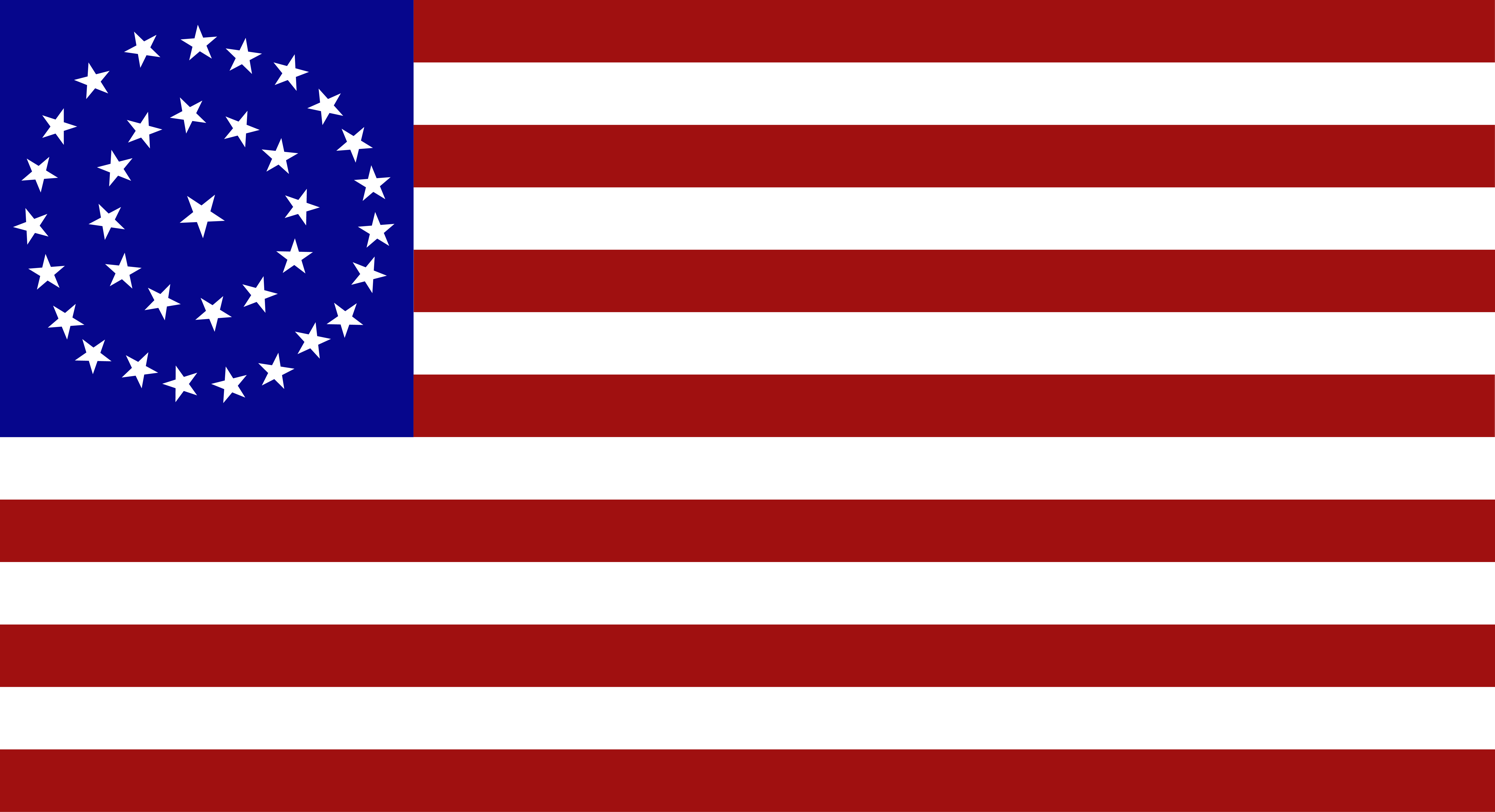
Digital reconstruction of the flag flown by Company G

== Company assignments ==
- Headquarters: At Camp Union from September 1861 to March 1862 when it moved to Camp Wright, then for a short time was at Drum Barracks before joining the California Column's march across southern New Mexico Territory to Texas. There it occupied Franklin, Texas, until the regiment was mustered out in December 1864.
- Company A: Was enrolled at Yreka by Captain Joseph Smith. It was later reinforced by a group of 70 men from Oakland. It was mustered into the United States service at Camp Union, October 2, 1861. It was sent to the southern part of the State in January 1862, arriving at Fort Yuma during the month of February. During the month of March 1862, it started for New Mexico, arriving at Tucson in July, and at Fort Fillmore, New Mexico, in August. It was stationed at Fort Fillmore and Mesilla, six miles above, until January 1863; then at Pinos Altos until March 1863; then at Fort Stanton, New Mexico, to May 1864. It then formed part of an expedition to the headwaters of the Gila River, and was stationed at Fort Goodwin, Arizona, until it was ordered in to be mustered out, which took place at Mesilla, N.M., November 30, 1864.
- Company B: Was mustered into the United States service at Camp Union, October 18, 1861. It remained at that post until the latter part of February 1862, when it was sent to join the California Column. It was on the steamer Senator en route to San Pedro, February 28, 1862; at Camp Wright, March 31, 1862; at Pimos Villages, April 30, 1862; at Tucson during May and June; at Cienega de Sauz, July 31, 1862; at Fort Fillmore, August 31, 1862; en route to Fort Craig, September 30, 1862; stationed at Fort Craig from October 1862, to September 1863; scouting on Rio de los Animas and the Gila during September, October, and November 1863; at Fort Craig, December 1863, and January 1864; and at Franklin, Texas, from February 1864, to December 12, 1864, on which date the company was mustered out
- Company C: Was raised in Grass Valley by Captain John S. Thayer. It was mustered into the United States service at Camp Union, October 7, 1861. There is no record of the stations occupied by this company from date of organization to April 1863. The company was at Las Cruces, New Mexico, from April 1863, to June 1863; at Franklin, Texas, June 30, 1863; at Las Cruces, N.M., during July, August, and September 1863; at La Mesilla from October 1863, to February 1864; at Las Cruces to May 1864; at Fort Goodwin until ordered in to be mustered out, which event took place at Mesilla, November 30, 1864.
- Company D: Was organized at Sacramento, and was mustered into the United States service at same place September 17, 1861. It was soon sent south and joined the "California Column." There is no record of the stations it occupied until April 30, 1863, when it was at Mission Camp, on the Gila River, en route for Tucson. It was stationed at Tucson during nearly all the balance of its term of service, and was mustered out at Las Cruces, N.M., November 27, 1864, the officers and members whose terms of service had not expired going into Company D, First Veteran Infantry.
- Company E: This company was raised in Sacramento by Captain S. P. Ford. The exact date of the muster in of the company cannot be found. The Captain and a large number of the men were mustered in October 30, 1861, and that is probably the date of the muster in of the company. The company was stationed at Camp Union, near Sacramento, until January 1862. It was at Camp Latham, near Los Angeles, until March 1862; at Camp Wright, San Diego County, March 31, 1862; at Fort Yuma, April 30, 1862; at Grassy Camp, Arizona, May 31, 1862; at Fort Barrett (Pimos Villages), June 30, 1862; and at Tucson from July until December 1862. It was at San Pedro River, December 31, 1862; and at Fort Bowie, Arizona, in January 1863, where it remained until May 1863. It was then at Franklin, Texas, until August 1863; at Rio Miembres, New Mexico, August 31, 1863; at Las Cruces, September 30, 1863, to May 1864. It then went on the Gila River expedition, and was at Fort Goodwin until November 1864, when it marched back to Mesilla, where it was mustered out November 30, 1864.
- Company F: This company was raised in Quincy, Plumas County, by Captain James H. Whitlock, and was mustered into the United States service at Camp Union, October 23, 1861. The company was stationed at Camp Union until January 1862; then at Camp Kellogg until March; at Camp Wright during the months of April and May; at Fort Yuma, June 30, 1862; at Maricopa Wells, July and August; en route to Tucson, September 30, 1862; at Tucson until April 1863; at Las Cruces, N.M., May 31, and June 30, 1863; in the field near Cooks Canon, New Mexico, July 31, 1863; in camp on Rio Miembres, N.M., August 31, 1863; at Fort West, New Mexico, from September 1863, to January 1864; then on Rio Miembres until September 1864; at Fort Cummings, N.M., during the months of September, October, and November 1864. Mustered out at Las Cruces, November 30, 1864.
- Company G: This company was raised by Captain Hugh L. Hinds in Placerville. It was mustered into the United States service at Camp Union, October 30, 1861, where it was stationed until February 1862. En route to Camp Latham, February 28, 1862; at Camp Wright, March 31, 1862; at Tucson from April to August 1862. While traveling thought Apache Pass private George McFarland was shot and killed by Apaches. Then at Fort Bowie, Arizona, from August 1862, to January 1863; en route to Fort Craig, N.M., January 31, 1863; at Fort Craig from January to June 1863; then at Franklin, Texas, to July 1864; at Las Cruces from July 1864, to date of muster out, November 27, 1864.
- Company H: Was raised by Captain Sylvester Soper at Placerville, and mustered' in at Camp Union. The exact date of muster in cannot be found, but it was probably November 14, 1861, as most of the men were mustered in on that day. The company was at San Diego, February 28 and March 31, 1862; at Camp Wright, April 30, 1862; at Fort Yuma, from May 1862, to January 1863; en route to Tucson, January 31, 1863; at Tucson until May 1863; at Cooke's Springs, New Mexico, May 31, 1863; at Franklin, Texas, June 30, 1863; at Las Cruces, July 1863, to February 1864; and at Franklin from February 1864, to date of muster out, December 12, 1864.
- Company I: Was organized in Benicia by Captain Joseph Tuttle. It was mustered into the service at Camp Union, November 11, 1861, where it remained until January 1862. It was at Drum Barracks, January 31, 1862; at Camp Kellogg, February 28 and March 31, 1862; at Camp Wright, April 30, 1862; at Fort Yuma from May to October 1862; at Drum Barracks, October 31, 1862, where the company remained until February 1863; at Gifthaler Ranch, February 28, 1863; at Fort Yuma, March 31, 1863; at Tucson from April 1863, to March 1864; at Camp Miembres, N.M., March 31, 1864; at Fort Cummings, N.M., from April to November 1864. Skirmish in Doubtful Canyon May 3, 1864. Mustered out at Mesilla, November 30, 1864.
- Company K: Was organized at Santa Cruz by Captain Thomas Theodore Tidball, and was mustered into the service at Camp Union, November 22, 1861. No record of locations unit July 1862, the company was crossing the Colorado River from Fort Yuma. While crossing the river Private Grimes' boat was quickly taken by the current. He panicked and Jumped into the river, but underestimated the river strength and drowned. There is no record of the stations occupied by the company until March 31, 1863, at which time it was at Casa Blanco, Arizona. It was at Tucson, April 30, 1863; Tidball Expedition against Apache Indians May 2–11, 1863, Skirmish at Canyon de Aravaipa May 7, 1863; and at Fort Bowie, Arizona Territory, from May 1863, to September 1864; then at Las Cruces, N.M., to date of muster out, November 27, 1864.

== See also ==
- List of California Civil War Union units
