= Cooke's Canyon =

Valley in New Mexico

Cooke's Canyon or Cookes Canyon is a valley and ephemeral stream located on the eastern slope of the Cookes Range in Luna County, New Mexico. It has its source at 32°28′20″N 107°40′47″W, north of Massacre Peak. The mouth of Cooke's Canyon is at its confluence with Fort Cummings Draw.

Cooke's Canyon is named for Lt. Col. Philip St. George Cooke, who commanded the Mormon Battalion from Santa Fe to San Diego, California during the Mexican–American War. Their task was to establish a wagon road, which later was called Cooke's Wagon Road and became the primary route used by the Southern Emigrant Trail. The Mormon Battalion crossed Cooke's Canyon on 17 November 1846. The upper part of Cooke's Canyon is part of what was called Cooke's Pass, a narrow gap, running east and west, through which the Southern Emigrant Trail passed through the Cookes Range.
