= Camp Goodwin =

Camp Goodwin (historical)
- Locale
- Nickname: Fort Goodwin
- Location within Arizona
- Coordinates: 33°05′20″N 110°03′29″W
- Country: United States
- State: Arizona
- County: Graham
- Elevation: 2,648 ft (807 m)
- Time zone: UTC-7 (Mountain (MST))
- GNIS feature ID: 23918

Camp Goodwin, and Fort Goodwin, a historical locale, at an elevation of 2648 feet, located in Graham County, Arizona.

== History ==
Camp Goodwin, then Fort Goodwin, was constructed in June 1864 by the California Volunteers, of the Union Army in Arizona Territory for a base for prosecuting the 1861-1872 Apache War and protecting settlers in the Upper Gila River region. It was named for Arizona's first territorial governor, John N. Goodwin. The adobe buildings it was constructed with began to crumble in a few years due to poor construction. Additionally the camp was plagued by malaria from mosquitoes in the cienega fed by the nearby spring from which the fort obtained its water. Called Camp Goodwin again from 1866, the camp was abandoned by the Army in March, 1871 due to the illness caused by malaria.

The camp was subsequently used as a subagency of the San Carlos Apache Indian Reservation until about 1884.

Today the site is located on farmland not far from the ghost town of Geronimo. Nothing remains of the post, the only physical marker is a Bureau of Land Management survey marker which indicates the original site of its flagpole.
