= 1st California Infantry Regiment =

1st California Volunteer Infantry
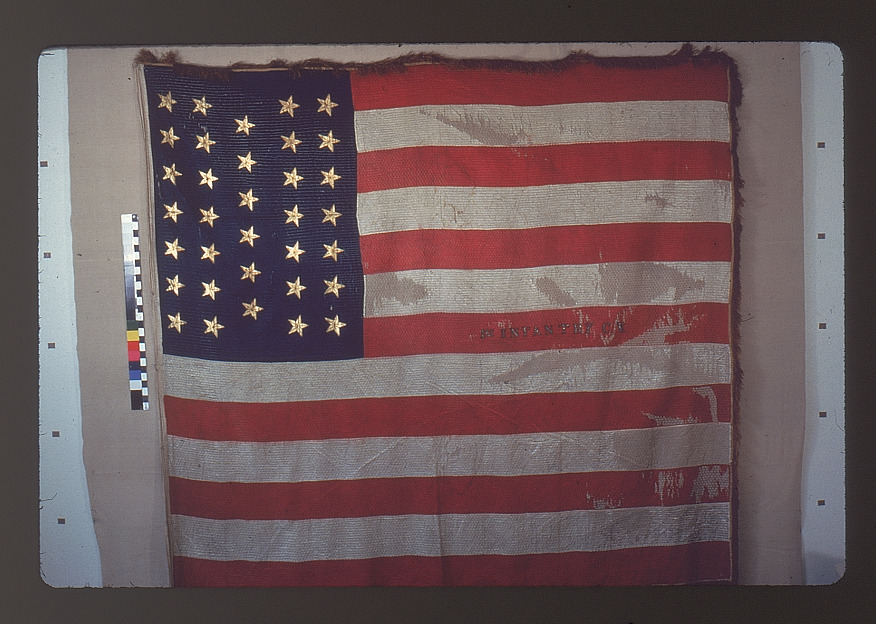
- National color of the regiment
- Active: September 1861 to October 21, 1866
- Country: United States
- Allegiance: Union
- Branch: Infantry
- Engagements: American Civil War: Capture of the Showalter Party (Co. G, D, F); Battle of Picacho Pass (Co. I); Battle of Apache Pass (Co. G & E); First Battle of Adobe Walls

The 1st Regiment California Volunteer Infantry was an infantry regiment in the Union Army during the American Civil War. It spent its entire term of service in the western United States.

== History ==
Most of the 1st California was recruited from August to October 1861, with the exception of Company K, which was organized the following February. Many of its companies were formed from companies of the California Militia taken intact into federal service others from individuals drawn from the militia. James H. Carleton served as colonel, Joseph R. West as lieutenant colonel and Edwin A. Rigg as major. It came under the command of the Department of the Pacific (later it would come under the Department of New Mexico). After some training at Camp Downy near Oakland and Camp Latham near Los Angeles. Companies D, F and G were sent to establish and garrison Camp Wright in November 1861. Detachments from the camp captured Daniel Showalter's party near Warner's Ranch, November 20–29, 1861. In December, 1861, five companies of the regiment were sent to Fort Yuma on the Colorado River and the others to various posts around Southern California.

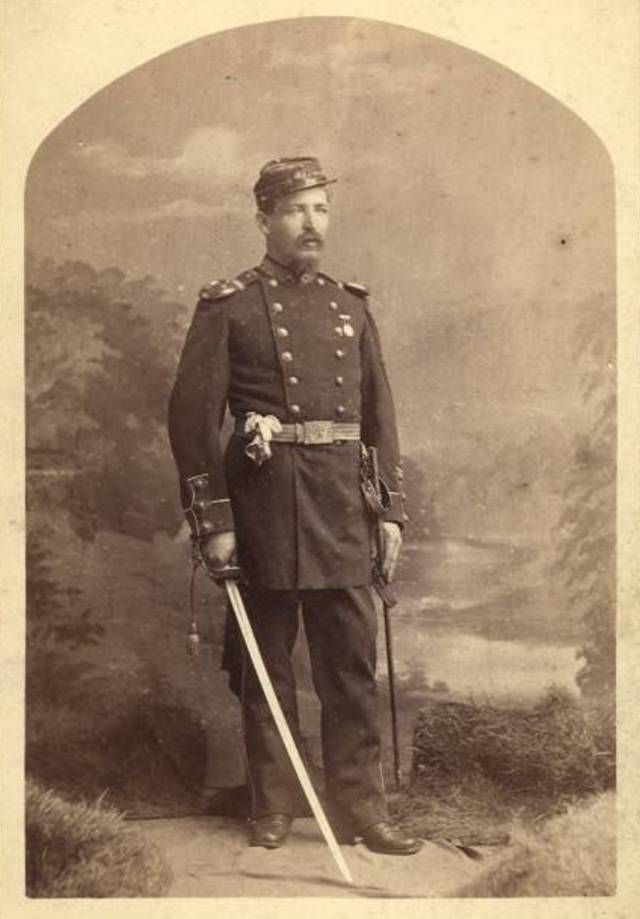
Colonel Joseph R. West in 1861

The regiment was assigned to the California Column, which was commanded by Carleton and composed of one infantry regiment (the 5th) and parts of two cavalry regiments (the 1st and 2nd) of California volunteers and a company of Regular artillery. The Column was formed to drive the Confederate Army of New Mexico out of the eastern part of the New Mexico Territory. Due to supply problems, the force did not start for New Mexico until February 1862. The 1st California Infantry saw fighting at the Battle of Picacho Pass (only Company I) and the Battle of Apache Pass (this battle was against Apache, not Confederates). During the battle sergeant O'Brien and private John Bar were killed. The regiment eventually moved to Fort Craig.

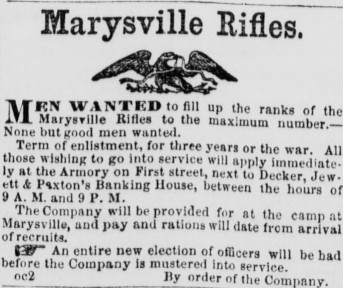
Company I recruitment ad

For the remainder of the war, the 1st California Infantry was engaged in garrison duty dispersed in posts across New Mexico Territory and Texas and fighting Apache and Navajo Indians in these places and in Utah Territory. The regiment was mustered out on October 21, 1866.

== Commanders ==
- Colonel James H. Carleton August 19, 1861 - June 1, 1862
- Colonel Joseph R. West June 1, 1862 - April 1864
- Colonel Edwin A. Rigg April 1864 - December 1864

== Flags ==
At the start of the war [special order, No. 2.] was issued by WM. C. Kibbe to help outline the design for California regimental flags.

"The first or national color for Infantry shall be the same as that described for the garrison flag of the United States Army, with this exception: the name and number of the regiment shall be embroidered with silver on the centre strips." The national flag presented to the regiment on 16 September 1861, was made with Kibbe's orders in mind. The flag is now stored in the state's capitol.

Company C's flag was made by Laura Meek and presented to the company's captain in Jackson. The flag would be carried for three years. When the California Column entered Tucson, this flag was carried at the front. It was the first Stars and Stripes to be flown over Fort Breckinridge after it was recaptured from Confederate forces. It is now in the state's capitol.

Company D's national flag was made by the women of San Jose and presented to the company on August 8, 1861. It would later be flown over their officer's quarters while at Oak Grove Butterfield Stage Station. In 1864 when the company's enlistment expired the men headed home and took their flag with them. While on their trip back home near Fort Yuma one of the men died, soon his comrades draped black fabric around the flag as a sign of mourning.

Company E was presented a "Banner" by the members of the Ladies' Association in Sacramento on August 17, 1861.

Company I received a "..magnificent silk American flag" made by the women of Marysville on July 4, 1861. Then two months later they were presented with a "..beautiful silk flag" by the Treasury Department. In 1949, one flag was presented to the California National Guard by Mrs. Jessie Weslow Hale, whose father served in the unit.

One of the regiment's flank markers is stored in UC Berkeley's Bancroft Library.

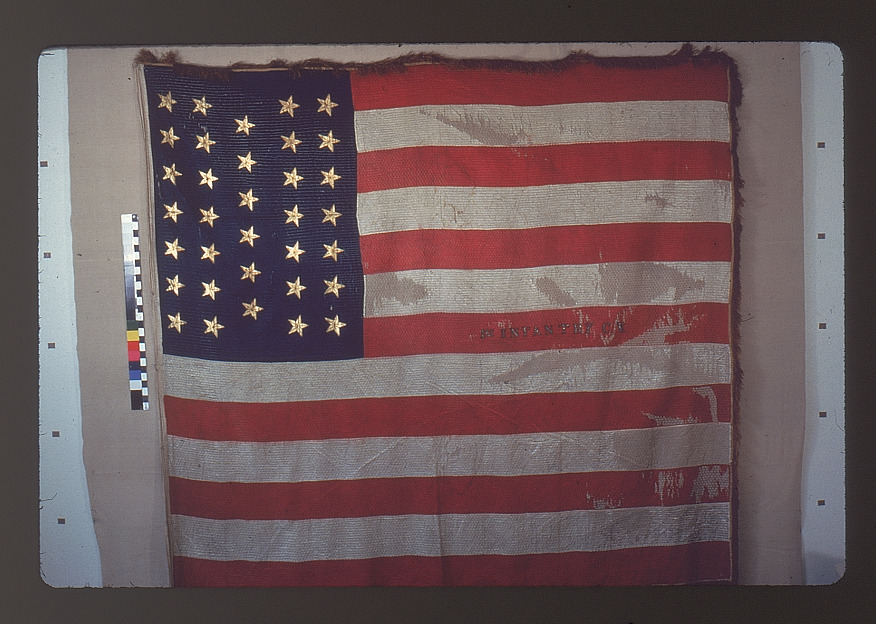
Regiment's National flag

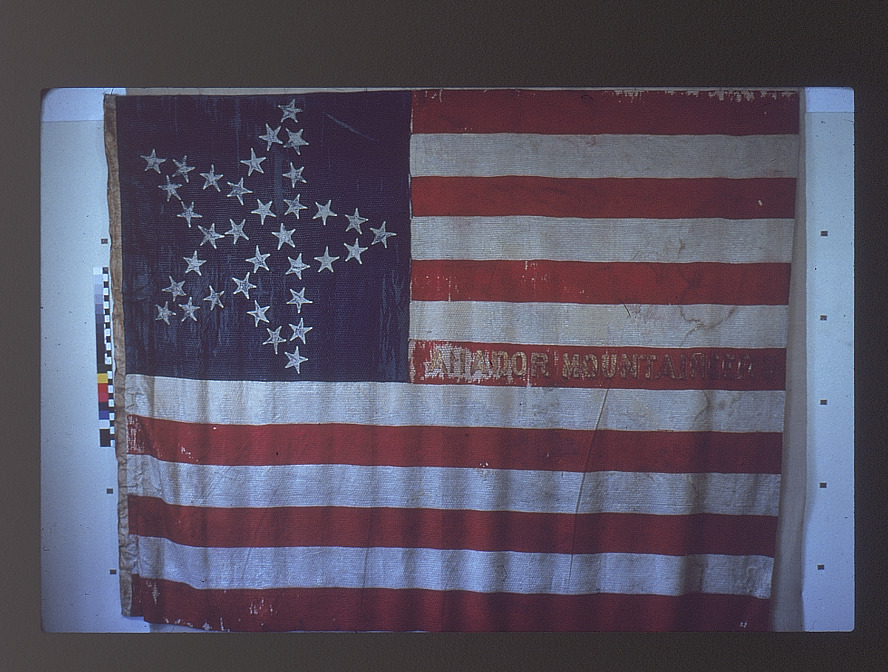
Company C National flag

== Company assignments ==
- Headquarters: At Camp Union from September 1861 to March 1862 when it moved to Camp Wright and then Drum Barracks before joining the California Column's march across southern New Mexico Territory to Texas. There it occupied Franklin, Texas until the regiment was mustered out in December 1864.
- Company A, Formed largely from men of the California Volunteers, California Militia of Oroville.
- Company B, Formed largely from men from the Marion Rifles and other militia companies in San Francisco and others recruited at Camp Latham, near Los Angeles.
- Company C, Formed from the Amador Mountaineers, California Militia, Jackson.
- Company D, Formed from the San Jose Volunteers, California Militia, San Jose.
- Company E, Formed from the Washington Rifles, California Militia, Sacramento City & County.
- Company F, Formed from the Sierra Greys, California Militia, La Porte.
- Company G, Formed from Company "H", California Militia from Nevada City, California.
- Company H, Formed largely from men from San Francisco.
- Company I, Formed largely from men from the Marysville Rifles of Marysville.
- Company K, Formed largely from men from San Francisco.

== Notable members ==
- Sergeant George Hand, Company G, published the book, The Civil War in Apacheland (1996)

== See also ==
- List of California Civil War Union units
