= Battle of Cookes Canyon =

Part of the Apache Wars (1861)

Coordinates: 32.45778°N 107.66782°W

- Part of the American Civil War; Apache Wars
Date	Mid August, 1861
Location	Cooke's Canyon, Arizona Territory, now in Luna County, New Mexico

Belligerents
(Confederate States of America) Confederate States	Apache

Commanders and leaders
N/A	Mangas Coloradas; Cochise

Strength
24 militia	~100 warriors

Casualties and losses
4 killed 8 wounded	Unknown

The Battle of Cookes Canyon was a military engagement fought between settlers from Confederate Arizona and Chiricahua Apaches in August 1861. It occurred about 40 miles (64 km) northwest of Mesilla, in Cookes Canyon. The exact date of the battle is unknown. The battle occurred in the larger context of both the Apache Wars and the American Civil War.

== Background ==
In early August, a group of Arizonan refugees from the Tubac area abandoned their village after the withdrawal of U.S. troops from Fort Buchanan and the Siege of Tubac which left their homes burned. The bunch was known as the Ake Party, and their destination was the Rio Grande near Mesilla.

The wagon train consisted of six double wagons, two buggies, and one single wagon when it reached Tucson from the surrounding region. At Tucson, several other people joined the procession, which including Moses Carson, the half-brother of the famous scout and soldier Kit Carson.

The party was composed of 24 men, 16 women, and 7 children, along with 400 head of cattle and 900 head of sheep, as well as horses and goats. The settlers, who were mostly miners and ranchers, left Tucson around August 15, 1861. The large number of livestock would present an irresistible temptation to the Chiricahua Apache warriors under Cochise and Mangas Coloradas. The journey was uneventful until the party crossed the Mimbres River and made for the springs at Cooke's Canyon within Traditional Arizona and the present day New Mexico.

== Battle ==
It is unknown whether or not Cochise and Mangas Coloradas were leading the Apache warriors. Most likely they were, as the commanders of the combined Apache force that operated primarily in present-day southwestern New Mexico where Cooke's Canyon is located.

When the last wagon had entered the canyon, the Apaches, estimated to number about 100, sprang their ambush by attacking and scattering the large group of livestock. They then charged the wagons and were stopped from reaching them after a series of mounted countercharges by several men of the party. The wagons were maneuvered into a circle, and the settlers withstood a siege that lasted the remainder of the day. Eventually the Apaches took to the surrounding slopes, firing both arrows and bullets at long range. The settlers responded from their wagon positions, killing several of the attackers who approached them on horseback and foot. Finally, toward the end of the day the Apaches retreated, taking their plunder of 400 cattle and 900 sheep with them. The settlers withdrew to the Mimbres. They had suffered a loss of four men killed and eight wounded.

== Aftermath ==
The last wagon in the party, carrying most of the women and children, had turned about after the first shots were fired and fled back toward the Mimbres River. Unmolested by the Apaches, this wagon reached the settlement on the Mimbres safely and sent a plea for help to Pinos Altos, where the Arizona Guards were stationed. The Confederate troops responded to the report, leading to the Battle of the Florida Mountains two days later.

During the summer of 1861, the Apache warriors of Mangas Coloradas and Cochise massacred several other groups of settlers at Cookes Canyon. Apache warriors killed and mutilated a party of seven near the east end of the canyon. Near the same location, they massacred and mutilated nine Mexican herdsmen and stole their forty head of cattle. Three whites of the same party were taken prisoner, tortured and killed later on. Fourteen American settlers were murdered on either July 25 or 26, 1861, and discovered by the Los Angeles Mounted Rifles, soon after.

Again, near that same location they attempted to destroy the Ake Party. Over the months, Apache warriors left what one chronicler called "many bones, skulls, & graves" in Cookes Canyon. Eventually, the Apaches killed as many as 100 Americans and Mexicans in Cookes Canyon, making it the most feared passage on the trail from Mesilla to Tucson. According to historian Dan Thrapp, 150 whites were killed within sixty days during this period. Around the same time, the Mexican governor of Sonora estimated that 500 to 600 of his people were killed by the Apache on their side of the border.

== See also ==
- American Indian Wars
