= Cookes Range =

Mountain range in New Mexico, US

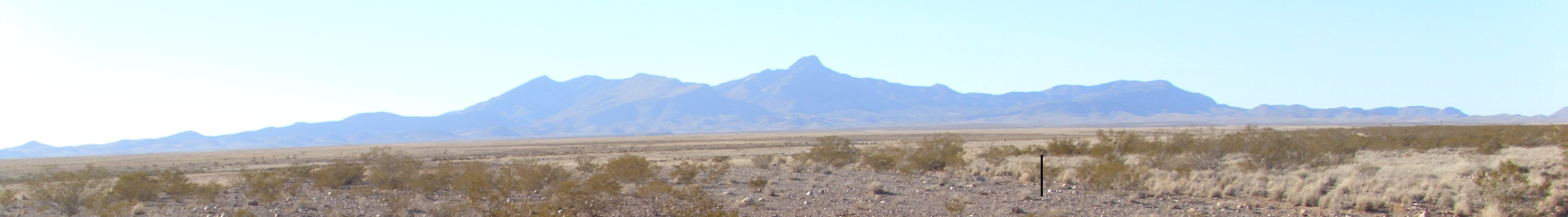
- Eastern side of Cookes Range

Highest point
- Peak: Cookes Peak
- Elevation: 8,408 ft (2,563 m)
- Coordinates: 32°32′10″N 107°43′54″W

Dimensions
- Length: 17 mi (27 km) N-S
- Width: 8 mi (13 km)

Geography
- Location within New Mexico
- Country: United States
- State: New Mexico
- Region: Northwest Chihuahuan Desert
- County: Luna
- Settlements: Deming, Nutt and Lake Valley
- Borders on: Whitehorse Mountain-NW; Mimbres Mountains-N; Good Sight Mountains-ESE; Deming, NM & Florida Mtns-S
- Topo map: USGS Massacre Peak

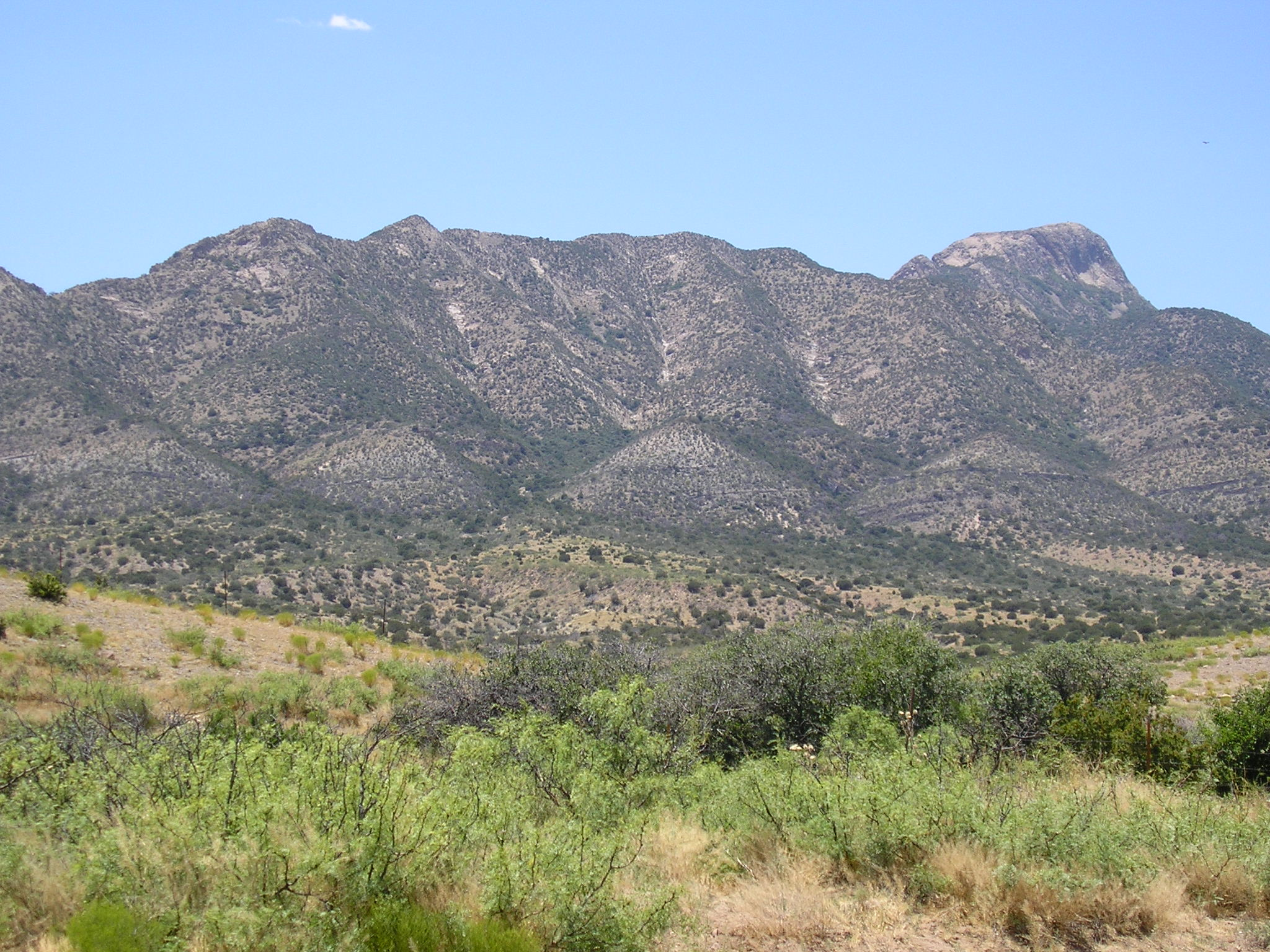
Cooke's Range BLM Wilderness Study Area

The Cookes Range (Cooke's Range, Cooks Range or Cook's Range) is a small, 17-mi (27 km) long mountain range in northern Luna County, New Mexico, which extends slightly north into southeastern Grant County. The range is a southern continuation of the Mimbres Mountains, itself the southeast portion of the extensive north–south running Black Range. The Cookes Range is surrounded by lower elevation areas of the northwest Chihuahuan Desert.

== Description ==
Cookes Range is about 17 mi long, and about 8 mi at its widest. The range is a basin and range north-south trending uplift with a center-north section intruded by granodiorite which forms Cookes Peak, 8,408 feet (2,563 m). Cookes Peak is at the head of OK Canyon, which exits the range eastwards. South of OK Canyon is a transverse ridgeline, across the range west to east, named Rattlesnake Ridge. One other larger peak occurs in the mountains and hills in the southern part of the range, Massacre Peak, at 5,667 feet (1,727 m). Other outlying lower elevation hills occur, east and west, in the north section, as the Cookes Range merges into the lower elevations of the Mimbres Mountains section of the Black Range.

== History ==
The range was named after its prominent peak, which in turn was named after Captain Philip St. George Cooke of the Mormon Battalion. Cookes Spring was a station on the Butterfield Trail.

From local Gary Cascio:

”It doesn’t look like much, but this is called the Cooke’s Range.

At one time in the late 1800s, this was considered the most dangerous stretch of territory in the entire United States. This range, which runs north and south, starts up in the Gila wilderness.

The Gila is the home of the Apache. Geronimo was born there. There is a spring there and settlers and stage coaches would stop there on their way from the Mesilla to Lordsburg to get water. Then they would travel through a canyon cut across the mountain. The Apache knew this was the route the settlers took. So literally, like shooting ducks in a barrel, the Apache attacked one wagon train after one stage coach after another. Supposedly, there are several hundred gravesites scattered through this canyon.”

Fort Cummings (1863–1873, 1880–1886), located in the southeastern foothills of the range near Cookes Spring was established to restrict Mimbreño Apache raiding.

Silver was discovered in the range north of Cooks Peak in 1876, and the Cooks Peak Mining District was established in 1880. Silver, lead, and zinc were mined there until 1967.

== Environment and ecology ==
The higher elevations of the range are pinon-juniper shrublands habitat which gives way to Chihuahuan desert in the foothills. The Cookes Range Wilderness Study Area is located in the range.

== See also ==
- Battle of Cookes Canyon
