= History of Visalia, California =

Visalia, California is the oldest continuously inhabited inland European settlement between Stockton and Los Angeles. It was commonly known in the 1850s as Four Creeks, after the waterways through the area. The area was also briefly known as Buena Vista by the Tulare County board of supervisors, before Visalia formally became the county seat on March 11, 1854. The city played an important role in the American colonization of the San Joaquin Valley as the county seat of Old Tulare County, an expansive region comprising most if not all of modern-day Fresno, Kings, and Kern counties.

== Background and founding ==
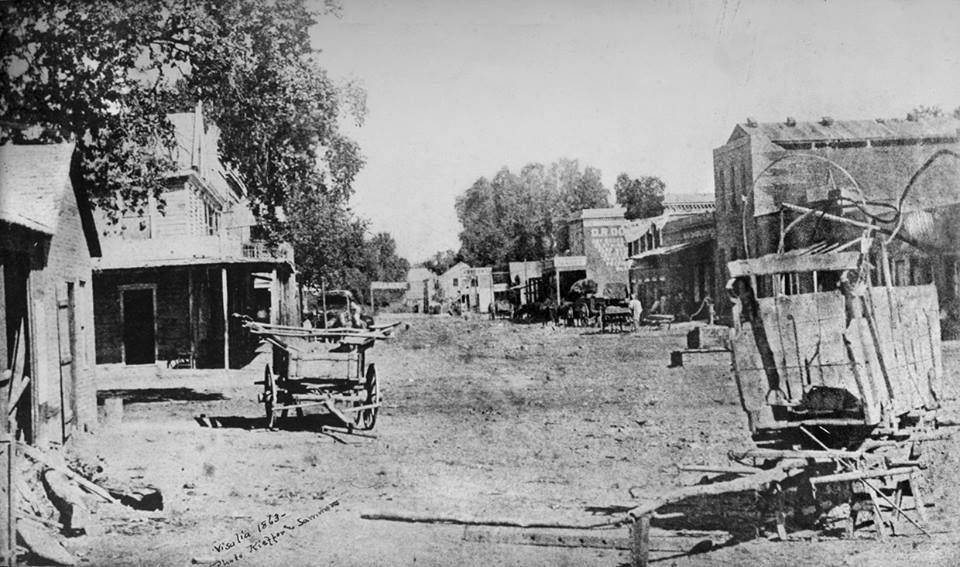
Photo of Main Street in 1863

Before California became a part of the United States, there were roughly 20,000 indigenous people, mainly the Yokuts, living in what is now Visalia. In 1825 or 1826, a crew of 16 people, led by preacher Jedediah Smith, became the first Americans to cross through the region. Over the next few decades, fur trappers and other explorers continued to traverse the area, resulting in increased and occasionally violent contact with the Yokuts. This contact accelerated after the California gold rush of 1849. During the fall of 1850, a crew of 13 or 14 people, led by John Woods, built a log cabin and started cultivating an area between the Kaweah and the St. John's rivers, located about 8 mi (13 km) east of modern-day Visalia. In December 1850, the Kaweah Yokuts, led by an escaped native named Francisco, gave Woods an ultimatum – either leave or suffer the consequences. Ten days later, they returned, possibly with as many as 1,000 people, killing eleven of men, including Woods, who was flayed and the skin nailed to a tree. Despite the massacre, western settlers continued to move to the region. In December 1851, Nathaniel and Abner Vise built a log cabin in a forested area on the north bank of the Mill Creek, located in what is now Visalia. At the time, the area was known as Four Creeks, after the watershed of creeks and rivers flowing from the Sierra Nevadas.

On April 20, 1852, Tulare County was separated from the larger Mariposa County. At the time, the settlement of Woodsville was temporarily the county seat, located about 8 mi (13 km) west of Visalia. Nathaniel Vise persuaded settlers to move near him due to good soil conditions. His early influence led to the area being named Visalia, named for Vise and his ancestral hometown in Kentucky. Early residents built a stockade, holding a wagon and supplies in case the area was attacked. In August 1853, the Tulare County board of supervisors established the township of Visalia, initially naming it Buena Vista, which was last used in February 1854 in favor of Visalia. By order from the California legislature, Tulare County held an election on September 7, 1853, to determine the permanent county seat. The result narrowly favored Visalia 44 votes, compared to 41 votes for Woodsville; residents of Woodsville alleged two or three people were bribed to sway the close election. On March 11, 1854, the Tulare County board of supervisors formally designated Visalia as the county seat. However, Visalia originally had no formal boundaries at the time, and it was not formally incorporated.

== Early history and incorporation ==
By 1854, settlers had built a school, a mill race, a gristmill, a sawmill, a saloon, and a store. By that time, the first white child was born in Visalia – Commodore Murray. Early in its history, Visalia was largely a jungle surrounded by a swamp. After gold was discovered in what is now Kern County, a road was built between Visalia and Keyesville. Between 1856 and 1860, an estimated 5–6,000 people passed through town, either seeking gold or returning from the mountains. In 1856, a conflict broke out between the Yokuts and white settlers, after rumors of cattle theft and arson. Residents in Visalia let in a few natives after overhearing the plan for attack. In the ensuing battles, the U.S. Army battalion killed about 100 Yokuts, leading to the retreat of the natives. On January 9, 1857, the entire region experienced an earthquake. In August 1857, the Tulare County board of supervisors petitioned the United States Congress to preempt Visalia from securing a proper town title. The clerk was ordered to file with the land office in San Francisco; however, the paperwork was never received, and Visalia remained unincorporated at the time. Also in 1857, Tulare County's first school, courthouse, and cemetery began construction in Visalia. On October 8, 1858, the city was first visited by John Butterfield's Overland Stage mail route, from St. Louis to San Francisco, and was officially added the following year. A new two-story courthouse was built in 1859, with a jail. Also in 1859, the town's first newspaper, the Delta, was established. On June 18, 1860, the Atlantic and Pacific Telegraph Company entered Visalia and established service, which was celebrated by a procession of every horse and carriage in town. Also in 1860, a majority of Visalia residents voted no on a measure to incorporate the city.

By the time the American Civil War began in April 1861, the town was largely populated by Confederate sympathizers. Competing factions supporting both sides were formed in the city, including the pro-secessionist newspaper Equal Rights Expositor which began in 1862. In local elections that year, pro-secessionist parties won on a platform of "anti-coercion". On October 8, 1862, a company of 59 Union Army soldiers, members of the 2nd California Cavalry, arrived in Visalia and established Camp Babbitt. The soldiers arrested Confederate sympathizers, including the owners of the Equal Rights Expositor, forcing loyalty pledges before releasing them. On March 5, 1863, a group of at least 70 men from Camp Babbitt sacked the newspaper headquarters, destroying the equipment, windows, and doors. Although the newspaper owners successfully petitioned the California legislature to compensate them, California governor Henry Huntly Haight vetoed the bill, stating that the actions were done by soldiers of the federal government. Although largely remembered locally for its role in putting down Confederate sympathizers, Camp Babbitt was also a strategic base in the Owens Valley Indian War of 1862–1863, notably for its association with the Keyesville Massacre. It was abandoned in 1866.

While the Civil War was ongoing, Visalia was inundated twice during the Great Flood of 1862, in which 42 homes were destroyed, mostly those made of adobe. Main Street flooded to 2 ft (0.61 m) deep from January 20–23, and four bridges in and around the town were destroyed. Most water wells in town were contaminated, forcing residents to either collect rainwater or rely on the town's single water pump. The 1862 floods created the St. John's River as a tributary from the Kaweah River, which functioned as the primary water outlet to Tulare Lake across the delta that Visalia was situation on. As the town rebuilt after the floods, most buildings in the floodplain were either wooden or brick. On February 27, 1867, the California legislature formally designated Visalia as a city. It was in this charter that a common council and an ex-officio Mayor and President were established, a system which—alongside at-large elections—is still in use today.

Visalia has been called a one-time "capital" of the buckaroos or vaqueros, the California cowboys.

=== Luxilis occidentalis ===
Four Creeks is the only place that the fish Luxilis occidentalis is known to have lived except for Poso Creek in Kern County. It was collected here in 1855 by Dr A.L. Heerman.

== Remainder of 19th century ==
Another flood in December 1867 deepened the St. John's River, which inundated downtown with 5 to 6 ft (1.5 to 1.8 m) of floodwaters. After the floods, the city built a levee made of material from the river channel. In February 1872, Visalia leaders held a meeting in an attempt to bring the line of the Southern Pacific Railroad through town, forming a committee to secure the right-of-way. Two months later, Southern Pacific President Leland Stanford denied the request from the committee due to how built up the town was, and the main line from San Francisco instead passed about 7 mi (11 km) west of Visalia, at a location called Goshen. In response, the Visalia–Goshen railroad was incorporated in May 1874, opening three months later. South of Visalia, South Pacific planned out the site of Tulare, which early investors intended to be the new county seat. However, residents of Visalia petitioned the California legislature for more funds, leading to a new courthouse being built in 1876.

Visalia flooded in the spring of 1875, and again in 1877, when the original levee broke. Another flood in 1890 washed away the levee, causing floods that lasted for a day, and washing out a portion of railroad tracks. In 1891, in an effort to reduce flooding, workers deepened and straightened the channel of the Mill Creek. Also that year, the city introduced electric lighting. In 1895, the city began paving 12 streets downtown. In 1896, the San Joaquin Valley Railroad reached the city. This was followed a year later by a Southern Pacific rail line that extended to Exeter.

== 20th century ==
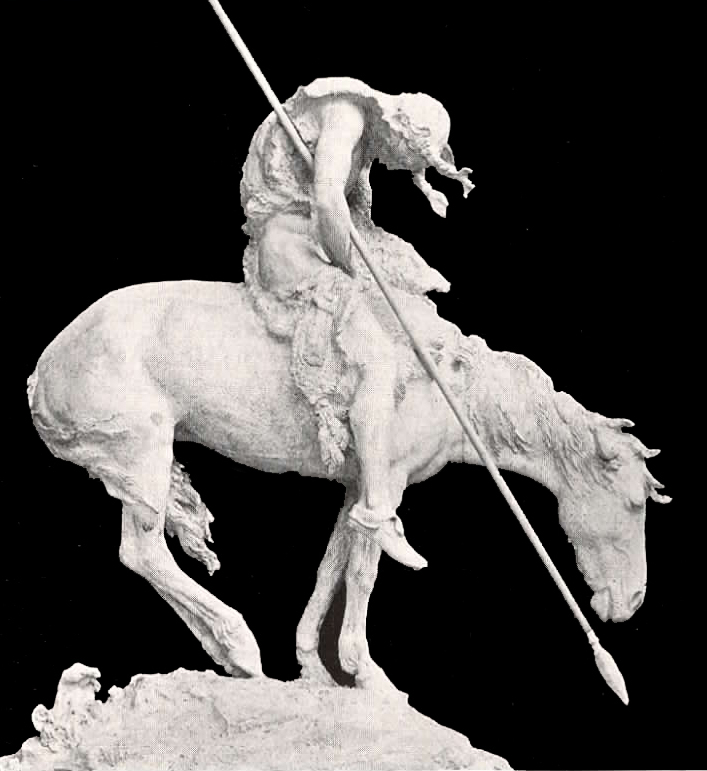
The End of the Trail

In 1902, Visalia built a city-wide sewage system, at a cost of $80,000. Parts of the city were flooded again in March and June of 1906. Parts of downtown were inundated for 10 days. On January 14, 1909, floodwaters destroyed the levee and inundated the northeast portion of town.

In September 1919, Visalia's Mooney Grove Park became home to the original End of the Trail statue by James Earle Fraser, originally constructed for the 1915 Panama–Pacific International Exposition held in San Francisco. In 1968, the National Cowboy & Western Museum in Oklahoma City obtained the original work, which had become damaged over time, while a replica was built and installed at Mooney Grove Park in 1971. In 2019, the city celebrated the 100th anniversary of the statue's display at the park. The city also acquired another statue from the 1915 San Francisco exposition, hosting The Pioneer from 1915 until 1980 in Mooney Grove, until it was damaged by an earthquake.

In 1935, an annex to the courthouse was built, and remained in use by the county until 2008; it was later converted into the Darling Hotel. In 1941, the Tulare County supervisors voted to build a new courthouse, later choosing a location away from downtown, adjacent to the city borders. A lawsuit in 1950 temporarily halted plans, but the California Court of Appeals ruled that the new site would not change the location of the county seat. In 1942, the levee along the St. John's River had a small break, causing minor flooding in northeast Visalia. In 1944, the United States Congress authorized the construction of the Terminus Dam, which would control the regular flooding along the Kaweah and St. John's rivers. On February 2, 1945, two-thirds of Visalia flooded after there were four breaks in the levee, causing significant damage to the city's downtown. In July 1952, an earthquake affected much of the San Joaquin Valley, causing minor damage throughout Visalia, including to the old courthouse. Another flood occurred in December 1955 that lasted six days, followed by another flood in January 1956 that lasted five days. In 1958, the new $2.8 million courthouse opened, which was significantly larger than the older building, at 135,000 sq ft (12,500 m^{2}) of office space. The Terminus Dam opened in 1962, which helped stop the regular flooding that had affected Visalia since its founding.

Beginning in the 1960s, Visalia and Tulare had discussions of creating a greenbelt between the two cities, on the location of the former Tagus Ranch. Tulare County commissioners rejected the plan in 1974. The plan resurfaced in 1998, to be under joint jurisdiction between Visalia, Tulare, and the county. By 2000, both cities canceled the plans.

== Population growth ==
Year	Population
1910	4,550
1920	5,753
1930	7,263
1940	8,904
1950	11,709
1960	15,791
1970	27,268
1980	49,729
1990	75,636
2000	91,565
2010	124,442

== Oak tradition ==
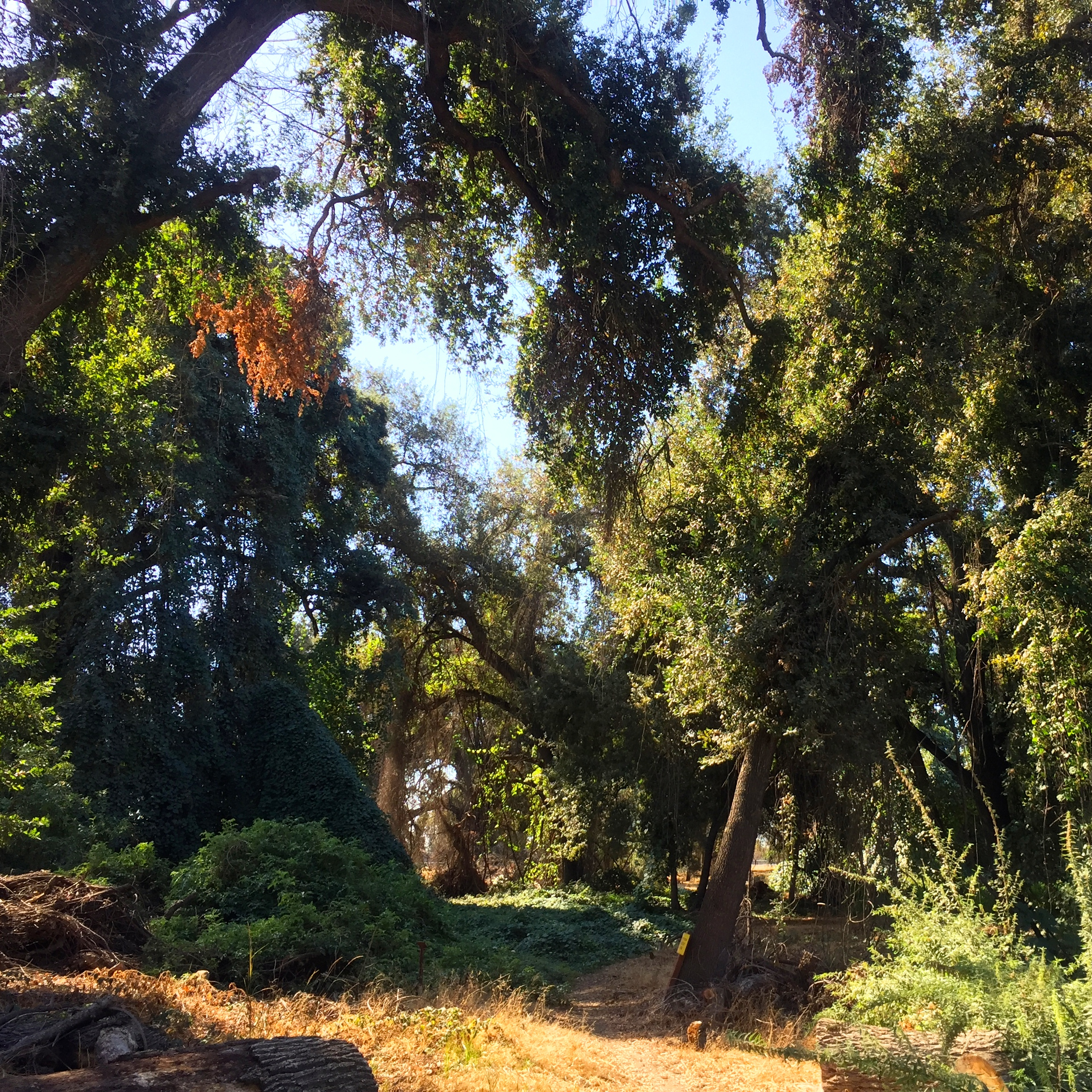
The Kaweah Oaks preserve, just east of Visalia.

Enjoying and caring for oak trees has been a Visalia tradition for nearly 100 years. City neighborhoods lined with these graceful trees show the foresight of early community leaders. When Visalia was founded in 1852, it was located in the largest valley oak woodland in California. Nourished in the fertile soils of the Kaweah River delta, valley oaks covered a 400-square-mile (1,000 km^{2}) area. As Visalia's population grew, more trees were cut down for firewood and to make room for new crops. Fewer trees remained. In the 1890s, Visalians saw the oak tree as a renewable source of community pride and identity that deserved preservation. Community leaders worked together to protect the valley oak. In 1909 they proposed that Tulare County accept the donation of 100 acres (0.40 km^{2}) of oak trees on Mooney Ranch and preserve the land as a park in perpetuity. Mooney Grove Park is still one of the largest valley oak woodlands in California. In 1922, local groups started the first tree planting program, putting into the ground the oak sentinels now lining Highway 198. In 1971, the city passed an ordinance requiring a permit to remove an oak tree. In 1974, maintenance and preservation guidelines were added. Removing a Valley oak tree without a permit can be a $1,000 fine.
