= Camp Babbitt =

American Civil War Union Army camp

Camp Babbitt
- Visalia, California, United States
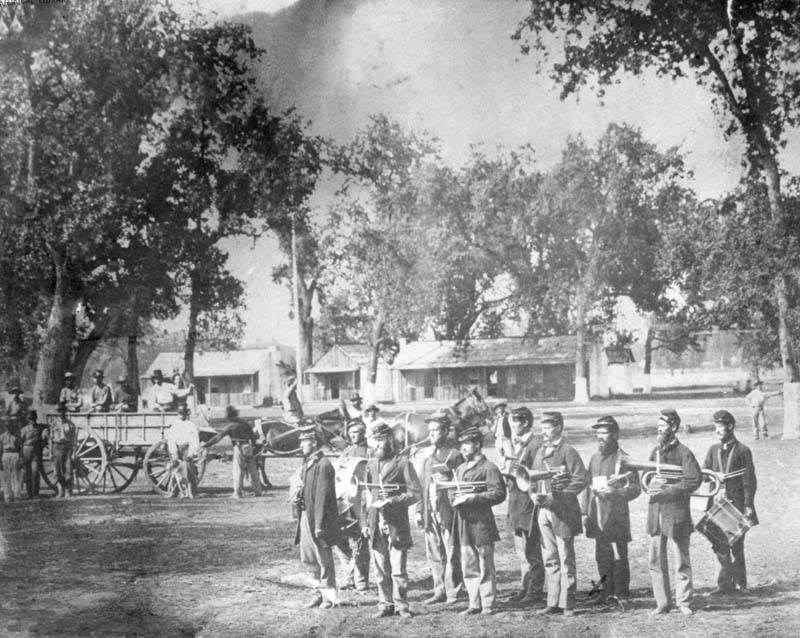
- Camp Babbitt in 1862

Site information
- Type: Military camp
- Owner: United States Army
- Controlled by: 2nd California Cavalry
- Open to the public: Yes

Location
- Location within California Location within the United States
- Coordinates: 36°20′07″N 119°17′16″W

Site history
- Built: June 24, 1862
- Fate: Abandoned 1865

Camp Babbitt was an American Civil War Union Army camp located in two sites in the vicinity of Visalia, California.

== History ==
The first site of Camp Babbitt, established on June 24, 1862, was located one mile northeast of the center of the town of Visalia, in Tulare County. It was first garrisoned by two companies of the 2nd California Cavalry. The post was named for Lieutenant Colonel E. B. Babbitt, Quartermaster General of the Department of the Pacific.

== Visalia Secessionist Disturbances ==
The post was first intended to maintain order in the area where strong pro Confederate sentiments were creating unrest. In an attempt to control subversion of the Union cause in the secessionist hotbed of Visalia, on the orders of General George Wright, Captain Moses A. McLaughlin moved his company D and another in October 1862 over the Sierra Nevada Mountains from the Owens Valley in four and a half days to take command of Camp Babbitt. There was one saloon in town that allowed soldiers from the fort in. On November 29 when soldiers were told by the barkeeper no cigars on the cuff, shots rang out. One soldier was killed and two secessionist were wounded. A group of armed secessionists started to patrol the streets before the camp's commanding officer said "he would not require his men to endure insults without retaliation." Suggesting if the didn't crowd dispersed he would "...turn his men loose on them," The secessionists went home. After the shooting, fist fights between the volunteers and secessionist became a common occurrence.

On December 12, three men from Visalia rode in front of a dress parade of the garrison and cheered for Jeff Davis, prompting McLaughlin to order their immediate arrest. On December 24, 1862, McLaughlin wrote for reinforcements, in the face of rising tensions between the Union and Secesh factions. On December 31, McLaughlin issued orders for the arrest of the owners and publishers of the "Expositor", the local secessionist newspaper. That same day he was instructed by headquarters by telegram to release all political prisoners after they had taken the oath of allegiance. Both owners eventually swore the oath, one after a time in the jail. However this did not stop them from continuing to publish their paper opposing the war and the Union cause. Three months later of the Newspaper pubublished an article calling the soldiers the "California Cossack," this angered the whole garrison. So on the night of March 5, 1863 a mob of 70-80 soldiers and pro-union citizens wrecked the whole office. On July 4, a secessionists named Routh was assaulting people in streets who were taking part in Independence Day celebrations. Routh was soon knocked down, he then tried to draw his pistol but was quickly shot by Sergeant Blenco, he survived. On August 6, around 12 o'clock group of soldiers from the camp were walking though the streets of Visalia when a local cheered for Downey in front of them. Private Donahue warn the man if he said it again he would shoot him. They both soon got into heated argument with Private Donahue then drawing his pistol starting a large gunfight between the soldiers and large party of secessionist. During the shooting around 30-40 shots were exchanged with Sergeant Charles C. Stroble being killed and 3 secessionist were left severely wounded. The soldier and a party of pro-union citizens chased some of the secessionist out of town. They later searched for James L. Wells for the killing of the Sergeant, but were unable to find him.

== Owens Valley Indian War ==
By April 12, 1863, Lt. Col. William Jones, was commander at Camp Babbitt, ordered Captain McLaughlin to reinforce Camp Independence with a detachment of 24 men of Company D and 18 men of Company E, 2nd Cavalry, California Volunteers, with a 12-pounder howitzer, and four six-mule government wagon teams, carrying rations, ammunition, and forage. Elements of Company D and Company E under Captain McLaughlin, on the resumption of hostilities in the Owens Valley marched there in April 1863 via Keyesville, where they engaged in the Keyesville Massacre. They then moved on to Camp Independence in the Owens River Valley, participating in the final campaign of the Owens Valley Indian War, and escorted almost 1000 Paiute to Fort Tejon in July 1863.

== Mason Henry Gang ==
On February 18, 1865, Captain Herman Noble sent a detachment of Company E, 2nd California Cavalry, under Sergeant Rowley, from Camp Babbitt near Visalia in a long pursuit of men believed to be the Mason Henry Gang. It took them across the deserts of Southern California, south to Sonora, Mexico. The March 15, 1865, issue of The Visalia Delta described the pursuit:

MASON AND HENRY - The squad of soldiers sent out from Camp Babbitt by Captain Noble under the command of Sergeant Rowley, in pursuit of the above Constitutional Democratic murders of Union men, have returned to camp. They report a very hard skirmish, traveling over 900 miles through a most desolate country; upon several occasions going out two or three days without food for themselves, or forage for their horses. They were several times on their trail, after they left Fort Tejón, and finally tracked them down into Sonora, when they were compelled to give up the chase on account of their horses giving out and their inability to get fresh ones. The fugitives were well supplied with gold, having $3,000 or more in their possession. It is believed by many that they have gone to recruit a guerrilla band, and will return to prey on Union men in the lower part of the State. They could have obtained plenty of recruits nigher home. Doubtless, Visalia would have furnished several birds of prey and a surgeon or two, to bind up their broken bones, and very likely a Chaplain to minister to their bruised souls, and a number of spies, sneaks, and informers. As to good fighting men, they would be scarcer hereabouts. The party were out twenty-five days.

== After the Civil War ==
After the end of the Civil War, on October 2. 1865, the post was relocated about a mile northeast of its first site. Various dates have been given for its abandonment, from late in 1865 to August 19, 1866." Its last garrison was Company A, 2nd California Cavalry, transferred in November 1865 from Fort Miller to Camp Babbitt. It remained there until it mustered out at Camp Union in April, 1866.

== The sites today ==
The original site was near Race and Santa Fe Streets. The second site was in the vicinity of Ben Maddox Way and Houston Avenue.
