= Moses A. McLaughlin =

Moses A. McLaughlin (1834–1899) was an Irish-born California Militia officer, Union Army officer, farmer, later a medical doctor. As Captain, 2nd Regiment California Volunteer Cavalry, he is best known for his role in the 1863 Keyesville Massacre, and subsequent campaign that forced the capitulation of the Owens Valley Paiute in the Owens Valley Indian War and their removal to Fort Tejon.

== Early life ==
Moses A. McLaughlin was born in County Antrim, Ireland in 1834. Little is known about his early life except that he immigrated to the United States and was in Oroville, California, by late 1856. There on December 22, 1856, he joined in organizing the Oroville Guard, a California Militia Company headquartered at Oroville, Butte County, California. M. A. McLaughlin was chosen Captain, but after they had received their arms, a disastrous fire burned the armory and surrounding buildings on July 5, 1857. This ended their activities until the beginning of the Civil War.

== Early Civil War Service ==
After the start of the American Civil War McLaughlin enlisted in the 2nd Regiment California Volunteer Cavalry September 10, 1861, as a captain. His Company D, was soon sent to Southern California to support the buildup of troops there for the defense and occupation of the area.

McLaughlin may have had prior professional military experience in the cavalry arm, (possibly in the antebellum U. S. Army), for one of his superiors, Assistant Adjutant General, Lt. Col. Richard C. Drum mentions him in his report of his tour of inspection of the District of Southern California:

At Kline's ranch I found Captain McLaughlin's company, Second Cavalry. One third of this company are on detached service, as expressmen, teamsters, &c., ... The portion of the company at this station I found admirably instructed in all their duties (excepting their clothing, which is very bad), and in good condition for active service. This officer is, I think, one of the best instructed in the cavalry force from this state, and prompt and active in the discharge of all his duties."

McLaughlin was soon thereafter ordered to Fort Yuma to face a general court marshal for "cruelly beating and maltreating" Private Michael Burke, formerly a member of his company. On June 6, Lt. Col. George Spafford Evens under orders to organize an expedition to deal with the Indian rising in the Owens Valley, asked headquarters for a fully manned and mounted Company D, and an officer to command it. He pointed out that McLaughlin was still awaiting orders in Fort Yuma. Still in command of his company, McLaughlin continued in service with Lt. Col. Evans at Camp Independence from late July in the Owens Valley following the first, seemingly successful campaign of the Owens Valley Indian War.

== Visalia Secessionist Disturbances ==
In an attempt to control subversion of the Union cause in the secessionist hotbed of Visalia, on the orders of General George Wright, McLaughlin moved his company and another in October 1862 over the Sierra Nevada Mountains from Owens Valley in four and a half days to take command of Camp Babbitt. On December 12, three men from Visalia rode in front of a dress parade of the garrison and cheered for Jeff Davis, prompting McLaughlin to order their immediate arrest. On December 24, 1862, McLaughlin wrote for reinforcements, in the face of rising tensions between the Union and Secesh factions.

On December 31, McLaughlin issued orders for the arrest of the owners and publishers of the "Expositor", the local secessionist newspaper. That same day he was instructed by headquarters by telegram to release all political prisoners after they had taken the oath of allegiance. Both owners eventually swore the oath, one after a time in the jail. However this did not stop them from continuing to publish their paper opposing the war and the Union cause.

== McLaughlins Campaign in the Owens Valley ==
At the beginning of March 1863, the Owens Valley Indian War broke out again. The commander of Camp Independence, Captain Ropes, sent messages to Camp Babbit requesting assistance. Camp Babbitt immediately sent First Lieutenant S. R. Davis with 44 men to reinforce camp Independence. Several skirmishes between the belligerents occurred that month, with little effect on the war.

On April 12, 1863, Lt. Col. William Jones, now commander at Camp Babbitt, ordered Captain McLaughlin to reinforce Camp Independence with a detachment of 24 men of Company D and 18 men of Company E, 2nd Cavalry, California Volunteers, with a 12-pounder howitzer, and four six-mule government wagon teams, carrying rations, company property, ammunition, and forage. Because settlers of Keyesville had appealed to the Department of the Pacific, orders included the instructions:

The captain will halt a few days in the upper end of the valley, where the difficulties are said to exist, and investigate the matter, and if the position of the Indians should be found as favorable as represented, if deemed advisable will give them battle. The captain will have about forty men, with arms to arm twenty more. This, with the number of citizens that will join him from Keyesville, will give him a force sufficient to handle any number of Indians that he will be likely to meet at that place.

=== Keyesville Massacre ===
Captain McLaughlin met with settlers upon his arrival in Keyesville in the Kern Valley. From them he learned that there was a large body of Indians encamped upon the North Fork Kern River; that they believed them to be engaged in the war and in the depredations committed in Kern River Valley.

The Captain then summoned three friendly local Indian leaders. One Jose Chico was an Owens Valley Indian, but resided on the Kern River, where he cultivated a farm. He told McLaughlin that the Tehachapies had endeavored to have him go to the war with them: that many of his own Indians had gone; that some had returned and were now in the valley, sleeping in the camps at night and hiding in the daytime; that there were many Indians there whom he did not know, either Owen's or Tehachapies. Ordering Jose Chico to stay with him in camp, he sent the other two leaders away and advised certain citizens that he was going to visit this camp on the river and that he requested their presence to vouch for the Indians there that they might know.

At 2 a.m. on April 19, Captain McLaughlin, Lieutenant Daley and twenty men, with Jose Chico as guide, left camp, marching at night 10 miles from Keyesville, at dawn surrounded the camp of the Indians, upon the right bank of Kern River. McLaughlin had the males collected together, and informed Jose Chico and the citizens who had arrived that they might choose out those whom they knew to have been friendly. The boys and old men he sent back to their camps, and the 35 others for whom no one could vouch, were either shot or sabered.

=== McLaughlin's Owens Valley Campaign ===
On April 24, 1863, Captain McLaughlin arrived at Camp Independence from the Kern River country. As senior captain he became the new Camp Commander. From that time McLaughlin conducted operations in Owens Valley following new tactics not previously used in the war. He no longer pursued the enemy up canyons into the mountains to be ambushed in places of their choosing. Instead he sent detachments of his men high up the mountains at night. Then at daylight they would sweep downward toward the valley, driving any enemy out into the valley where another detachment awaited to cut them off. His soldiers were constantly seeking out the Indian food stores and destroying them. Scouting parties were employed in searching for any smaller bands who remained behind hidden in the tule swamps along the river. No day passed without two or three of them being found and killed, and everything destroyed that could be of any use to the living. McLaughlin instructed the troops that it was of the utmost importance that prisoners should be taken, not only women but men, confident that their love of life would prompt them to furnish important information and that possibly they could be used as guides. Additionally the Owens Valley Indians had never been taught how to maintain their firearms, and their firearms became rusted and encrusted with dirt, making many unserviceable. Some gun barrels were found to have exploded.

Also on May 14, 1863, several natives who had remained hidden near the Owens River were captured by Captain Noble's men, and finding that they would not be harmed, but that they would receive food and clothing, and being informed through the interpreter that Captain McLaughlin came to make peace, they were prevailed upon to conduct the troops to where they supposed a large party belonging to Joaquin Jim was encamped and where they could be surrounded. From these Indians, McLaughlin learned that Captain George was near Death Valley and furnished them with passes and white flags, allowing them fifteen days from the 16th of May to find Captain George and the other Indians and bring them into camp.

Meanwhile, with this intelligence and his guides, McLaughlin made a raid on Joaquin Jim's Camp from May 15–19, 1863. However, Joaquin Jim and his band escaped the trap. On his return to Captain Noble's camp on Big Pine Creek, on May 19, 1863, McLaughlin issued an order suspending hostilities until further orders and sent out more Indian messengers. Captain McLaughlin sent 90 soldiers and 26 Paiute including Captain George to trail Joaquin Jim through Round Valley, up Pine Creek and over Italy Pass into the Sierras, losing him a week later in late June 1863.

Meanwhile, on May 22, 1863, Captain George came into Camp Independence to talk peace. He indicated that he no longer wanted war. As a result of his surrender, more than four hundred natives came in to lay down their arms. The bands of Captain Dick and Tinemaha soon followed Captain George's example. By June, there were 500 at the camp and almost 1000 by July.

=== March of the Owens Valley People to the Sebastian Indian Reservation ===
McLaughlin was ordered to march the surrendered native Owens Valley people to the Sebastian Indian Reservation near Fort Tejon. McLaughlin reports on how he conducted the march:

... upon the evening of July 10, 1863, I had the Indians assembled upon the camp parade ground, where, as they passed by file, they were counted and found to number 998. Many more came in afterward, who must have increased the number to considerably over 1,000. I then caused them all to be seated except the chiefs, whom I called to the center of the parade ground, and there announced through the interpreter, José Chico, the orders with regard to their removal. I had taken the precaution to have the troops so stationed that their presence did not excite the suspicions of the Indians, and yet at the time I made the announcement they were completely surrounded. Seeing that there was no avenue of escape they quietly submitted, Captain George remarking, "American capitan sabe mucho, Indian poco." The acting commissary of subsistence furnished them with rations until the 31st of July. During the night the troops slept upon their arms on the parade ground, ready at a moment's notice to prevent any attempt at escape. The night passed off quietly, and on the morning of the 11th the rations and as many of the women and children as could be were placed in the wagons, and the whole, guarded by about seventy men, composed of detachments of Companies G and E, left Camp Independence. The weather being very hot, the Indians making an unwilling march, and with so little transportation, the sufferings upon the route were intense. At Walker's Pass I found that the water was insufficient for the troops, Indians, and animals, and fearing to meet another train at Desert Springs, I made a night march through the pass across the summit, and followed down the South Fork of the Kern River till its junction with the North Fork, with the intention of passing through Walker's Basin. Along this whole route good water and grass are found, which well compensates for the difference in the length of the road. Fearing that forage from San Pedro would not arrive in time, I had caused forage to be gathered at Walker's Pass, and as the train passed down Kern River Valley sufficient was collected to furnish them through to the reservation. I am satisfied that had I crossed the desert many lives would have been lost from want of water, and that great suffering at least has been avoided by the route through Walker's Basin. On the evening of July 17, while encamped at Hot Springs Valley, three miles from Keysville, on the left bank of Kern River, I had the honor to receive your letter of instructions, dated July 9, 1863, relative to the removal of the troops from Camp Independence, and also Special Orders, No. 162, relative to the abandonment of Camp Independence. On the morning of July 18 I placed Captain Noble in command of the expedition, and, accompanied by Captain Ropes and one man, started back to Camp Independence, where I arrived on the 21st of July; distance, supposed, about 150 miles. Captain Noble, after having delivered the Indians over to the Indian superintendent, will go on to Fort Tejon with the detachment belonging to his company.

== Command at Fort Tejon, Dismissal from the service ==
Captain McLaughlin, as ordered, prepared for moving his force at Camp Independence to Fort Tejon and occupy it. McLaughlin was also ordered to establish a camp for the summer occupied by one company, nearby or on the South Fork of Kern River, to protect to the whites residing there and in the country known as Owen's Lake Valley. This camp on the Kern River was later called Camp Leonard, garrisoned by a detachment of Company G, and was located opposite the mouth of the Kelsey Cañon, on the South Fork Kern River. This camp was also later directed to intercept any Owens Valley people trying to return from the reservation, but had little luck in that task.

On August 6, 1863, McLaughlin left Fort Independence with Companies D, E and G for his new post, by a 250-mile march via Kern River, Hot Springs Valley, Walker's Basin, Agua Caliente, the Sinks of Tejon, Sebastian Reservation, and Canada de las Uvas, arriving at Fort Tejon on the 17th of August in eleven marching days, resting one day at Hot Springs Valley for repairs.

Captain McLaughlin remained in command at Fort Tejon until he was called away to Camp Babbit, December 17, 1863, leaving Capt. James M. Ropes, 2nd Cavalry in charge temporarily. Captain John G. Schmidt, Second Infantry California Volunteers, took his place when the 2nd Cavalry was replaced by Schmidt's Infantry Company from January 26, 1864. Captain Thomas Barker, took command February 25, 1864.

Captain Moses A. McLaughlin, was tried at a Court Martial at Camp Babbit, Visalia, Jan. 21, 1864, for conduct Unbecoming an Officer and Gentleman. He was dismissed from the service on Jan. 22, 1864.

The General Court Martial convened at Camp Babbit, Visalia, California, convicted McLaughlin of Conduct unbecoming an officer and a gentleman. Specifically he was charged:

- First, with ordering, while Acting Quartermaster at Camp Babbit, a saddler to make a riding saddle and charge it to the United States as a pack saddle and taking it for his own use and benefit by not putting in on the list of government property.
- Secondly he was charged with certifying the correctness of a voucher in favor of one William Oldgate for hay, said to have been delivered at Camp Babbit, for the amount of twelve hundred dollars, when the name of William Oldgate was fictitious. Also he was charged for turning over to his successor as Quartermaster, his list of outstanding debts, this debt due to Oldgate for hay, of twelve hundred dollars, and a certified voucher to that effect, with the understanding that the amount of said voucher was to be paid to Capt. McLaughlin as soon as funds became available to pay said William Oldgate. Additionally he was charged, for receiving one thousand dollars in payment of the debt and voucher of the fictitious Oldgate.
- Thirdly he was charged with paying a contractor for fuel, $499 in lieu of the $540 due him and pocketing the $41 difference.

Despite his conviction, all the members of the court, in view of Captain McLaughlin's high reputation, and in the belief that his conduct was owing to a misconception of his duties and accountability as Acting Assistant Quartermaster, signed a recommendation to the reviewing authority for the favorable consideration of the case.

== Later life ==
The disability resulting from his dismissal from the Union Army was removed by order of the president of the United States, October 23, 1867, due to the reason that:

... although it is evident Capt. McLaughlin conducted the business of his position in an irregular and therefore improper manner, his offences – which rather consisted in conduct to the prejudice of good order and military discipline than unbecoming an officer and a gentleman – where unattended by any personal profit or criminality; and (in view of the animus by which he was governed) were scarcely sufficient to warrant dismissal from the service. It is recommended that the disability occasioned by his sentence be removed ...

In 1869, land McLaughlin owned in San Francisco, was targeted by a land title scheme which was thwarted. McLaughlin lived for a time as a farmer in Sonoma County, and his first son Alfred was born there in 1871.

Within a few years McLaughlin divorced his first wife Mary E. McLaughlin in 1874. He later was married, to Margaret McLaughlin[41 in 1899], and at his death in 1899 he had 2 sons and 2 daughters. His son Alfred McLaughlin born in 1871, (28 in 1899), was also a Doctor at the time of his father's death, the son of his first wife. Four years after his divorce, McLaughlin became a doctor, studying at the University of California School of Medicine, San Francisco: Toland Medical College, and graduated in 1878. He practiced as an Allopath. John Minkel sued Dr. Moses A. McLaughlin for $99 for extracting the wrong tooth.

He became involved with local politics and veteran affairs. On September 23, 1884, the Daily Alta California reported M. A. McLaughlin put his name forward for Supervisor of the Eleventh Ward of San Francisco. McLaughlin was also listed as a member of the Press Committee of the Department of California, Grand Army of the Republic in 1886.

McLaughlin died on November 11, 1899, at his home in San Francisco and was buried at Mount Calvary Cemetery. His remains were later removed, along with the remains of 40,000 other people buried at San Francisco's Calvary Cemetery, and were reburied at Holy Cross Catholic Cemetery in Colma, California.
