= Battle of Bishop Creek =

Battle of Bishop Creek was one of the early engagements of the Owens Valley Indian War fought on April 6, 1862, along Bishop Creek, in what is now Inyo County, California.

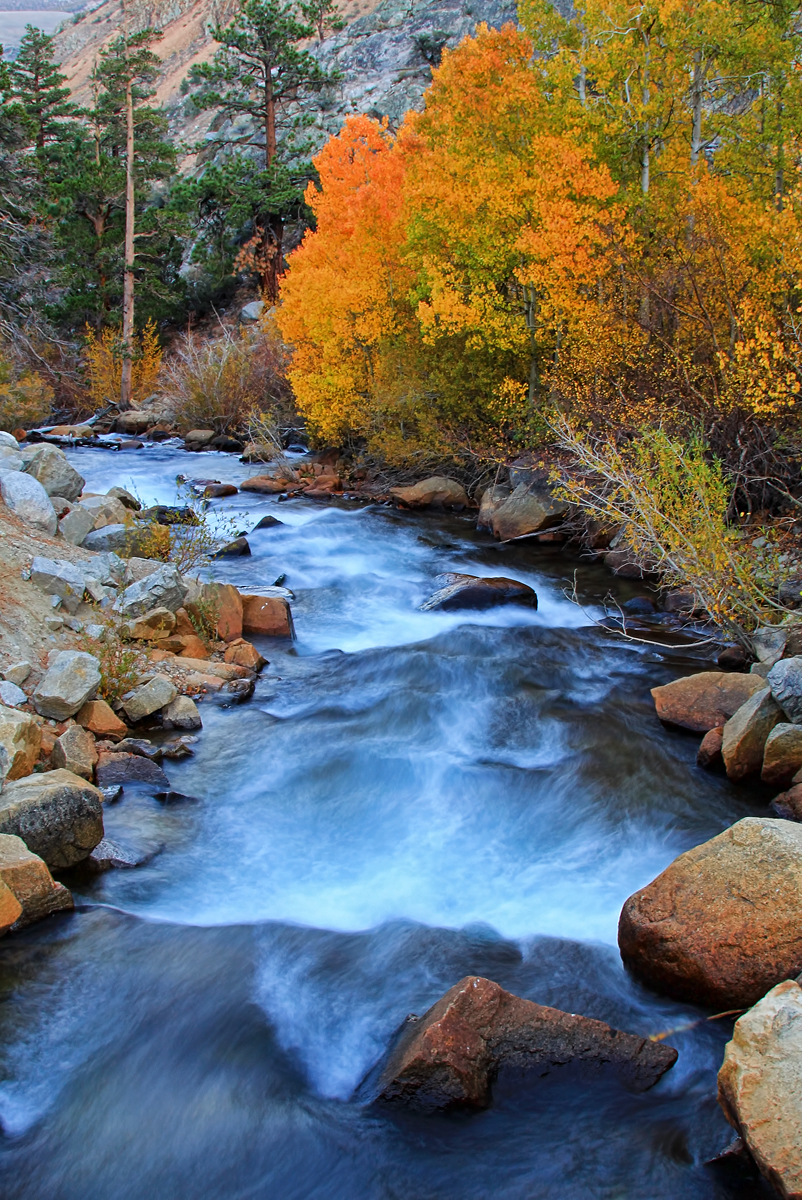
North Bishop Creek

In 1861, cattle were being driven over the Sierra Nevada Mountains to feed the mining boom town of Aurora. Some cattlemen had begun ranching nearby in the Owens Valley. The consequences of the disastrous winter caused by the Great Flood of 1862 and the encroachment of the cattle on the food supply of the Owens Valley Paiute led to the threat of starvation for them. They were forced to take cattle to feed themselves. This led to a conflict with these ranchers in several incidents. Despite a meeting and an attempt at peace between the two sides, that peace broke down in further incidents and broke into open warfare, that became known as the Owens Valley Indian War.

Threatened settlers concentrated their herds 30 miles (48 km) north of Owens Lake at the meadows on Oak Creek. They then sent messages for help to Aurora, then the county seat of nearby Mono County, and to Visalia, county seat of their own Tulare County, over the Sierra's mountains, for help. William Mayfield led a band of Tulare County militiamen to the aid of the settlers there. John J. Kellogg, a former Army captain led 18 men from Aurora to aid the settlers.

Following the arrival of these militia forces, they were combined with the local settlers under Colonel William Mayfield, as senior officer. He then led this force of 60 men on a march 50 miles (80 km) north up the valley on March 28, 1862.

On April 6, 1862, Mayfield and his militia encountered and engaged the Paiute in the Battle of Bishop Creek, where his force attacked but was driven back and were pinned down and had to hold out in a ditch until nightfall. They were then able to withdraw with their dead and wounded, and turned back down the valley.

"About noon on the 6th there was a very brisk engagement in which C. J. Pleasants of Aurora, Mr. Morrison of Visalia and Sheriff Scott of Mono county were killed. The whites took refuge in an irrigating ditch, whence they fired, inflicting some damage. At night, after the moon went down, the Indians ceased firing and the whites retreated, leaving behind seventeen or eighteen of their horses and considerable ammunition and provisions.

"Colonel Evans the next day met this party and persuaded about forty-five of them to return to the pursuit. The remainder retreated to the fort."

The next day, April 7, 1862, Mayfield's command encountered the California Volunteer force under George S. Evans, and Mayfield and 40 of his men joined him, and then proceeded to the north, while the casualties and the balance of the party returned to Oak Creek.

== California Historical Landmark ==
The site is a California Historical Landmark number 811.

The California Historical Landmark reads:

NO. 811 BISHOP CREEK BATTLEGROUND - On April 6, 1862, a battle took place around this site between newly arrived citizens of the Owens River Valley and the original inhabitants of the land, the Paiute and Shoshone Indians. The reason for this battle is lost but brave men on both sides died here for a cause which they held inviolate.

== See also ==
- California Historical Landmarks in Inyo County
- History of California through 1899

== Bibliography ==
- Menefee, Eugene L. and Dodge, Fred A., History of Tulare and Kings Counties, California, with biographical sketches of the leading men and women of the counties who have been identified with their growth and development from the early days to the present, Historic Record Company, Los Angeles, California, 1913.
- Willie Arthur Chalfant, The story of Inyo, Hammond Press, W. B. Conkey Company, Chicago, 1922
