= San Francis Ranch =

- Former settlement
- Location in California San Francis Ranch (the United States)
- Coordinates: 37°21′40″N 118°27′11″W
- Country: United States
- State: California
- County: Inyo County
- Annexed by: West Bishop, California

California Historical Landmark
- Reference no.: 208

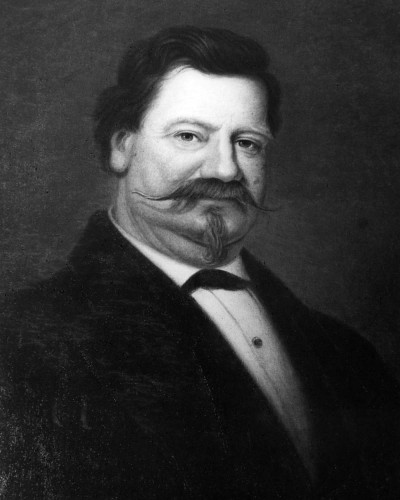
Samuel Addison Bishop in 1870

San Francis Ranch was the ranch of Owens Valley pioneer Samuel A. Bishop and his wife, located on a creek later named for him (Bishop Creek) southwest of modern Bishop, California, also named after him.

== Background ==
Bishop founded the ranch here in August 1861, after he and his wife drove 500 cattle and 50 horses from Fort Tejon to this spot in the Owens Valley, intending to sell cattle to the miners in the boomtown of Aurora and other mining camps in the area.

On January 31, 1862, Bishop's ranch was also the site were a meeting was held between the settlers in Owens Valley and leaders of the bands of Owens Valley Indians to prevent war over the trouble between them that had resulted from the killing of an Indian and a settler. A peace agreement was made between them there. However the peace broke down over the next months when a holdout leader of the Southern Mono Paiutes, Joaquin Jim continued hostilities and the conflict escalated into the Owens Valley Indian War.

The site of the former San Francis Ranch is in West Bishop in Inyo County and is marked by California Historical Landmark No. 208. The marker is on West Line Street (California Route 168) west of Mumy Lane, on the right when traveling west.

== See also ==
- California Historical Landmarks in Inyo County
- History of California through 1899
