= Joaquin Jim =

Eastern Mono war leader

Joaquin Jim (183? – 1863 or 1866) was an Eastern Mono war leader of the Owens Valley Indian War. Joaquin Jim, implacable war leader of the Mono allies of the Owens Valley Paiute, never surrendered to American forces or made peace with them, but reported to have ceased warfare against them in 1864.

Joaquin Jim was an Eastern Mono from what is now Big Pine, California. Following the death of Shondow he became the leader of the Eastern Mono that lived north of Big Pine Creek.

Captain Moses A. McLaughlin raided Joaquin Jim's Camp on May 18, 1863 destroying it but he and his people escaped. Captain George and over 1000 Owens Valley Paiute surrendered soon after and promised to help McLaughlin against Joaquin Jim. In late June 1863, Captain McLaughlin sent a column with 90 soldiers and 26 Paiute including Captain George that trailed Joaquin Jim through Round Valley, up Pine Creek and over Italy Pass into the Sierra Nevada Mountains, losing him a week later. Jim returned to Long Valley and dominated the northern Owens Valley and Adobe Meadows once McLaughlin left Camp Independence for Fort Tejon. He established his claim in the White Mountains with a red cloth banner trimmed with raven feathers.

Men on both sides started to ride armed, the Paiutes primarily with bows and arrows and the white men with rifles and pistols. As neither side actually wanted war, a peace convention was decided upon and held at the San Francis Ranch on January 31, 1862. Since one Indian and one white man had been killed, it was decided that both were even and that the Indians wouldn't bother the cattle if the white man would control their grazing (2,3). Everyone agreed to the treaty except one Indian leader, Joaquin Jim, the leader of the Southern Mono Paiutes. He and his warriors began raiding ranches and the peace treaty faded away within two months. Settlers petitioned for a return of the troops to protect them, describing:

... the notorious Joaquin Jim, chief of the Pi-Utes in this region since the removal of Captain George to Fort Tejon, with his own particular adherents, together with many fugitives from Fort Tejon and renegades from Captain George's tribe or division, are now settled in our midst; that is to say, on Bishop's Creek, near Owensville and upon the identical ground upon which Mr. Scott, sheriff of this county, and Colonel Mayfield were killed some two years ago. It is a well-known fact that Joaquin Jim is now and ever has been an uncompromising enemy of the whites; that he refused to emigrate with his people under treaty made with the U. S. authorities; that the many murders and outrages committed in this valley since the withdrawal of Government troops from this locality is traceable to the implacable animosity of this captain or chief to our people.

Two accounts of his death are incompatible. One report has him being injured in the war and killed in the San Joaquin Valley in April 1863. This seems unlikely since it was prior to the McLaughlin Campaign, when Joaquin Jim was still leading a band in the upper valley.

Another, Owens Valley Paiute report, has him dying in the winter of 1865-66, in Long Valley at the Casa Diablo Hot Springs some years after the war after eating a tribal delicacy. The white settlers claim he was killed by one of his own warriors.

Today descendants of Joaquin Band are enrolled members of the Bigpine paiute tribe, Bishop paiute tribe and Timbisha Shoshone tribe .
