= Slate Mountain =

Slate Mountain may refer to:

- Red Slate Mountain, a summit in California
- Slate Mountain (Nevada), a summit
- Slate Mountain, North Carolina, an unincorporated community
- Slate Peak, a summit in Washington
