= San Carlos, Inyo County, California =

Coordinates: 36°48′14.26″N 118°7′34.46″W

San Carlos is a former settlement in Inyo County, California, United States. It was founded in 1863 and was located on the east bank of the Owens River, 4 miles (6.4 km) east of Independence, close by to the west of the later site of Kearsarage.

Tensions in the area escalated as settlers from San Carlos, along with their cattle, exerted pressure on the Indigenous peoples inhabiting the region. In response to this encroachment on their land and resources, the Indigenous population took defensive actions, which included attacks on the town's residents. San Carlos and nearby Bend City competed to become the seat of the then Coso County. Several artifacts remain of San Carlos, including the ruins of stone buildings as well as old smelting tools.

== See also ==
- List of ghost towns in California
