= Owensville =

Ownesville may refer to:

- Owensville, California
- Owensville, Indiana
- Owensville, Maryland
- Owensville, Missouri
- Owensville, Ohio
- Owensville, Texas
