= Mayfield Canyon =

Valley in California

- Location within California
- Floor elevation: 5,347 ft (1,630 m)

Geography
- Location: Inyo
- Coordinates: 37°26′48″N 118°38′14″W
- Topo map: Mount Morgan
- Interactive map of Mayfield Canyon

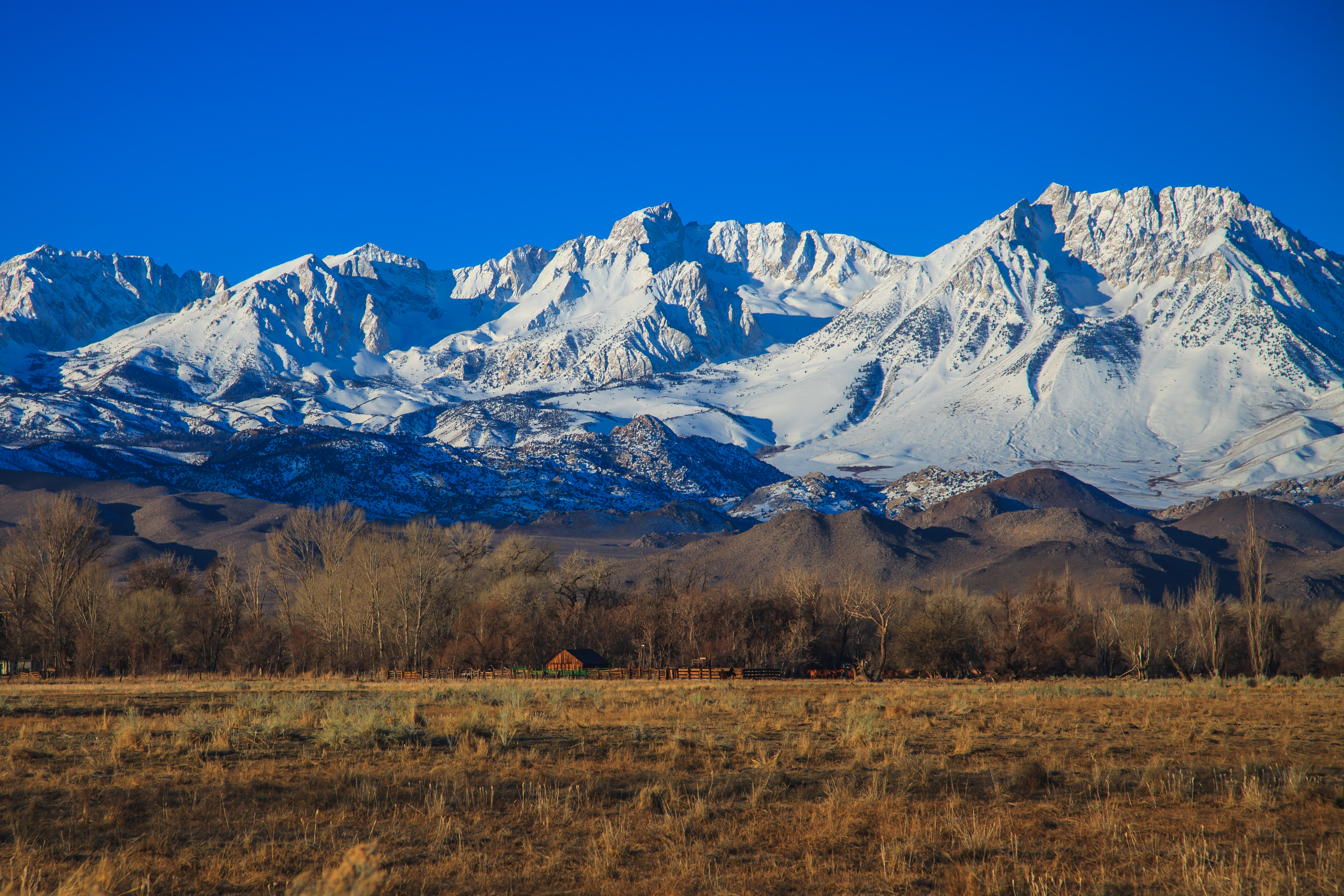
Mayfield Canyon is in the foothills of Eastern Sierra Nevada Mountains, about the center of this photo take from Bishop

Mayfield Canyon is a canyon on the east side of the Sierra Nevada mountains, northwest of the town of Bishop in Inyo County, California.

== California Historical Landmark ==
It was the site of the Battle of Mayfield Canyon during the Owens Valley Indian War in 1862. During the battle Colonel William Mayfield, leader of the Owens Valley settler militia, was killed. His name was given to the canyon.

The site of the Battle of Mayfield Canyon was designated California Historical Landmark number 211 on June 20, 1935. The California Historical Landmark reads:

NO. 211 MAYFIELD CANYON BATTLEGROUND - On April 8, 1862, a body of troopers and settlers entered Mayfield Canyon (named for one of the settlers) to fight the Indians supposed to be there. However, the Indians had evacuated the canyon so the group made camp at its mouth. The next day they went up the canyon again, but this time they were forced to retreat to Owens Valley.

== See also ==
- California Historical Landmarks in Inyo County
- History of California through 1899
