= Haiwee, California =

Unincorporated community in California, United States

Haiwee
- Unincorporated community
- Location in California Haiwee (the United States)
- Coordinates: 36°08′48″N 117°58′33″W
- Country: United States
- State: California
- County: Inyo
- Elevation: 4,075 ft (1,242 m)

Population (2020)
  - Total: 25

Haiwee (Timbisha: Heewi, meaning "Dove") is an unincorporated community in Inyo County, California, United States. It is located on the Southern Pacific Railroad, 24 miles (39 km) south-southwest of Keeler, at an elevation of 4075 feet (1242 m).

== History ==
Haiwee has variously been known formerly as "McGuire's", "Haiwai", "Hawaii" and "Hayways".

The settlement there began in 1864, as a waystop at Haiwai Meadows on the road between Visalia and the Owens Valley. The stop was run by a man named McGuire and his wife and young son. McGuire's wife and son were killed in an Indian attack while he was away on January 1, 1865. Owens Valley settler militia avenged their deaths, with an attack on the Indian village where the killers had taken refuge, in the Owens Lake Massacre on January 6, 1865. This was one of the last fights in the Owens Valley Indian War.

The original settlement site and the Haiwai Meadows are under the water of the Haiwee Reservoir. The town moved to a site west of the reservoir. A post office operated at Haiwee from 1906 to 1913, moving in 1909.

The 2020 population of Haiwee is 25 within Census Tract 8, Blocks 2270, 2273, 2274, 2242, 2169, 2267, 2264, 2165

== Climate ==
Haiwee has a hot-summer Mediterranean climate (Köppen climate classification: Csa) with winters being cold and summers being very hot. Due to its high elevation and low humidity, it experiences dramatic diurnal temperature variation, and it is common to have a difference of 30 °F between daily highs and lows.

Climate data for Haiwee, California (1991–2020 normals, extremes 1923–2017)
Month	Jan	Feb	Mar	Apr	May	Jun	Jul	Aug	Sep	Oct	Nov	Dec	Year
Record high °F (°C)	76 (24)	80 (27)	89 (32)	98 (37)	106 (41)	118 (48)	119 (48)	113 (45)	108 (42)	103 (39)	89 (32)	76 (24)	119 (48)
Mean daily maximum °F (°C)	51.2 (10.7)	54.7 (12.6)	62.3 (16.8)	68.9 (20.5)	77.8 (25.4)	88.6 (31.4)	94.0 (34.4)	92.7 (33.7)	86.5 (30.3)	74.5 (23.6)	60.2 (15.7)	50.4 (10.2)	71.8 (22.1)
Daily mean °F (°C)	39.1 (3.9)	42.1 (5.6)	48.2 (9.0)	54.1 (12.3)	62.4 (16.9)	72.3 (22.4)	77.9 (25.5)	76.7 (24.8)	70.4 (21.3)	58.7 (14.8)	46.5 (8.1)	38.4 (3.6)	57.2 (14.0)
Mean daily minimum °F (°C)	26.9 (−2.8)	29.5 (−1.4)	34.1 (1.2)	39.3 (4.1)	47.1 (8.4)	56.0 (13.3)	61.9 (16.6)	60.7 (15.9)	54.2 (12.3)	43.0 (6.1)	32.7 (0.4)	26.3 (−3.2)	42.6 (5.9)
Record low °F (°C)	4 (−16)	5 (−15)	18 (−8)	22 (−6)	31 (−1)	38 (3)	44 (7)	44 (7)	28 (−2)	19 (−7)	14 (−10)	−5 (−21)	−5 (−21)
Average precipitation inches (mm)	1.24 (31)	1.48 (38)	0.79 (20)	0.22 (5.6)	0.21 (5.3)	0.06 (1.5)	0.23 (5.8)	0.13 (3.3)	0.21 (5.3)	0.28 (7.1)	0.33 (8.4)	0.99 (25)	6.17 (157)
Average precipitation days (≥ 0.01 in)	4.3	4.9	2.9	1.9	1.8	0.5	1.8	1.0	0.8	1.4	1.5	4.0	26.8
Source 1: NOAA
Source 2: Western Regional Climate Center (extremes)
