= Fort Independence Indian Community of Paiute Indians =

Total population
- 86 reservation population (2011)

Regions with significant populations
- United States (California)

Languages
- English, traditionally Owens Valley Paiute language

Related ethnic groups
- other Owens Valley Paiute (or Eastern Mono) and Shoshone peoples

The Fort Independence Indian Community of Paiute Indians of the Fort Independence Reservation is a federally recognized tribe of Mono and Timbisha in the Owens Valley, in Inyo County, eastern California. As of the 2010 census the population was 93.

== Government ==
The Fort Independence Indian Community of Paiute Indians is headquartered in the town of Independence. The tribe is governed by a democratically elected tribal council. The current tribal administration is as follows.

- Chairman: Carl Dahlberg
- Vice Chairman: Alisa Lee
- Secretary Treasurer: Jack Bracken
- Gaming Commission: Kelly Morgan, chair, Daniel Miller, vice & Carl Dahlberg, compliance officer.
- Tribal Administrator: Carl Dahlberg
- Assistant Tribal Administrator: Cheyenne Stone
- Fiscal Manager: Anissa Eaton
- Fiscal Assistant: Brianne Bent
- Office Assistant: Jesseca Tsosie

Enrollment into the tribe is based on the original allottees at the time, 1999, when the tribe's Article of Association where adopted and all living descendants of the original allottees who have a minimum of 1/16 Indian blood quantum, who are not enrolled in other tribes.

== Reservation ==
Location of Fort Independence Reservation

The Fort Independence Reservation (36°50′28″N 118°13′44″W) in Independence, is a federally recognized Indian reservation with a total area of 356 acres (1.44 km^{2}) in Inyo County. It was established in 1915. In 1990, the reservation was 234 acres (0.95 km^{2}) large with a population of 38 Indians.

== Education ==
The reservation is served by the Owens Valley Unified School District.

== See also ==
- Indigenous peoples of California
- Fort Independence (California)
