= Coso County, California =

Unrecognised county in California

Coso County was a failed attempt in California to create a county from the territory of Tulare County and parts of Mono County east of the Sierra Nevada in 1864. It was the predecessor of Inyo County, which was successfully organized in 1866.

The county seat of Coso County was to be Bend City.
