= Samuel Addison Bishop =

Settler of the Owens Valley in California (1825–1893)

Samuel Addison Bishop (1825 – 1893) was a settler of the Owens Valley and is the namesake of Bishop Creek in Inyo County, California. He fought as a first sergeant in the Mariposa Battalion and later was a banker and a founder of the San Jose streetcar system.

== Biography ==
Bishop was born in Albemarle County, Virginia on September 2, 1825. He worked on the family's farm during his early life. Later, architecture and building provided him a little income, but it was building wagons and their wheels that became his main profession. He left everything behind and headed to California in April 1849 seeking gold. He arrived in the Mariposa area of California in early 1850. Unsuccessful with gold prospecting, he enlisted as a volunteer in a newly formed militia to protect settlers against attacks by Native Americans. In 1851 he fought in the Mariposa War and aided in the capture of the Ahwahnechee.

As peace returned to the area, Bishop began a business with trading shops then phased into cattle ranching. In 1861, Bishop drove over 500 cattle into the Owens Valley and founded San Frances Ranch on what would later be named Bishop Creek, about three miles southwest of the present town of Bishop. The ranch was named after his wife, Frances Elle Young, who is reported to be the first white woman to live in the valley. The ranch provided food for the Aurora Mining District in nearby Nevada. The Bishops only stayed on the ranch for about 18 months before moving to Kern County where Samuel became justice of the peace and one of the county's first Supervisors when its government was created in 1866. Two years later the Bishops moved to San Jose. There, Samuel became a banker and secured a franchise for constructing a streetcar line. San Jose remained his home until his death on June 3, 1893.

== Legacy ==
Bishop Creek was named after Samuel and subsequently the town of Bishop was named after the creek.
