= Slate Mountain (Nevada) =

Mountain in the state of Nevada

Coordinates: 39°07′25″N 118°12′00″W

Slate Mountain is a summit in the U.S. state of Nevada. The elevation is 6,696 feet (2,041 m).

Slate Mountain was so named on account of its material composition. A variant name is "Slate Peak".
