= Keyesville massacre =

1863 mass killing of Indigenous people in Tulare County, California

Coordinates: 35.76953°N 118.43532°W

The Keyesville massacre was a mass killing which occurred on April 19, 1863, in Tulare County, California during the Owens Valley Indian War. A mixed force consisting of American settlers and a detachment of the United States Army's 2nd California Cavalry Regiment under Captain Moses A. McLaughlin killed 35 Indigenous Californians from the Tübatulabal and Mono peoples "about ten miles from Keysville, upon the right bank of Kern River".

== Context ==
The Great Flood of 1862 had driven away the game that sustained the Mono people and their tribal members were starving.

== The orders ==
In early April, Lieutenant Colonel William Jones received a petition from citizens of Keysville and vicinity asking military protection from Indian depredations. He forwarded the petition and notified his superiors in San Francisco of the action he was taking:

CAMP BABBIT, Near Visalia, Cal., April 8, 1863.

Colonel R. C. DRUM,

Asst. Adjt. General, Dept. of the Pacific, San Francisco, Cal.:

Sir : I have the honor herewith to forward a petition from citizens of Keysville and vicinity asking military protection from Indian depredations. Captain McLaughlin will leave this camp on the arrival of the detachment of Company E, which will accompany him to join their company at Owen's Valley. They are expected to arrive this evening, and will leave on Saturday or Sunday morning, passing by the way of Keysville through Kern River Valley. The captain will halt a few days in the upper end of the valley, where the difficulties are said to exist, and investigate the matter, and if the position of the Indians should be found as favorable as represented, if deemed advisable will give them battle. The captain will have about forty men, with arms to arm twenty more. This, with the number of citizens that will join him from Keysville, will give him a force sufficient to handle any number of Indians that he will be likely to meet at that place. ....

I am, very respectfully, your obedient servant,

WM. JONES,

Lieutenant-Colonel, Commanding Camp Babbitt, near Visalia, Cal.

== The report ==
Captain Moses A. McLaughlin, commanding the expedition to Keysville, made the following report about the incident:

APRIL 12-24, 1863. Expedition from Camp Babbitt to Keysville, Cal.

Report of Capt. Moses A. McLaughlin, Second California Cavalry.

Camp Independence, Owen's River Valley, April 21, 1863.

Colonel: I have the honor to report that in obedience to instructions dated Camp Babbitt, near Visalia, Cal., April 10, 1863, and signed Lieut. Col. William Jones, Second Cavalry California Volunteers, I left Camp Babbitt on Sunday, the 12th instant, in command of twenty-four men of Company D and eighteen men of Company E, accompanied by Lieutenants French and Daley, one 12-pounder howitzer, and four six mule Government teams, used for the transportation of rations, company property, ammunition, and forage, all of which arrived in good condition at Camp Independence, Owen's Valley, on the 24th of the same month. Distance traveled I suppose to be 250 or 275 miles.

I had been instructed by Colonel Jones to investigate the Indian troubles on Kern River. On arriving at Keysville I was waited upon by several of the residents of the place, who represented that there was a large body of Indians encamped upon the North Fork of Kern River; that many of these Indians had doubtless been engaged in the war and in the depredations committed in Kern River Valley; that one man had been murdered in Kelsey Canon; that Roberts and Waldron had lost about 150 head of stock; that many other citizens had lost cattle, horses, and other property; that the roads were unsafe, and finally, that the Indians there congregated were for the most part strangers in the valley, and were thought to be Tehachapie and Owen's River Indians, who after seeing so many troops pass had endeavored to shield themselves from punishment by seeking the more immediate vicinity of the white settlements.

After having the above statements, and learning that Jose Chico was in the neighborhood, I sent for him and two other chiefs who were known to have been friendly. Jose Chico is an Owen's River Indian, but resides on Kern River, where he cultivates a farm, he speaks but little English. In Spanish he, however, makes himself well understood. From him I learned that the Tehachapies had endeavored to have him go to the war with them: that many of his own Indians had gone; that some had returned and were now in the valley, sleeping in the camps at night and hiding in the daytime; that there were many Indians there whom he did not know, either Owen's or Tehachapies. I told him to remain in camp with me and dismissed the others. I informed Doctor George, Mr. Herman, and others, citizens, that I would visit the camps early in the morning, and that they might accompany me and vouch for such Indians as they might know.

Accordingly at 2 a. m. on the 19th, accompanied by a detail of twenty men of my command and Lieutenant Daley, with Jose Chico as guide, I left camp, and at dawn surrounded the camp of the Indians, which was situated about ten miles from Keysville, upon the right bank of Kern River. I had the bucks collected together, and informed Jose Chico and the citizens who had arrived that they might choose out those whom they knew to have been friendly. This was soon done. The boys and old men I sent back to their camps, and the others, to the number of thirty-five, for whom no one could vouch, were either shot or sabered. Their only chance for life being their fleetness, but none escaped, though many of them fought well with knives, sticks, stones, and clubs.

This extreme punishment, though I regret it, was necessary, and I feel certain that a few such examples will soon crush the Indians and finish the war in this and adjacent valleys. It is now a well-established fact that no treaty can be entered into with these Indians. They care nothing for pledges given, and have imagined that they could live better by war than peace. They will soon learn that they have been mistaken, as with the forces here they will soon either be killed off, or pushed so far in the surrounding deserts that they will perish by famine.

A Tejon prisoner says the Tejon and Tehachapie Indians (those for whom the Government has done so much) have been engaged in both these wars, and as soon as they are tired return to the reservation. The Indian agents should be notified of this fact. If I have to send down there I will leave them very little to do, and save the Government some treasure.

The route from Visalia by way of Walker's Pass is far preferable to the Los Angeles route, an upon the former there is wood, water, and grass at easy marches. Forage can be purchased in Tulare Valley and forwarded to Keysville, from which point the Government teams can bring it to Camp Independence, having water and grass at intervals upon the road, of not more than fifteen or twenty miles, while upon the Los Angeles road from Tehachapie Canon by Walker's Pass, a distance of over fifty miles, there is not a blade of grass and the water unfit to be used.

I have the honor to be, very respectfully, your obedient servant,

M. A. Mclaughlin, Capt., Second Cav. California Vols., Comdg. Camp Independence.

Col. E. C. Drum, Assistant Adjutant-General, San Francisco, Cal.

== Site of the massacre ==
The village where the Keyesville Massacre occurred has been identified by Tubatulabal people as being on Tillie Creek, near the North Fork of the Kern River, now under Lake Isabella next to what is now Wofford Heights. This is used as the memorial site.

== See also ==
- Indigenous peoples of California
- Kitanemuk
- Serrano people
