= Oak Creek (Owens River tributary) =

Stream in Inyo County, California

Oak Creek is a tributary stream of the Owens River, in Inyo County, California. Its mouth lies at an elevation of 3,924 feet / 1,196 meters, 2.2 miles north northwest of Independence, California, just south of the Fort Independence Reservation. Its source is to the west at the foot of the Sierra Nevada at the confluence of South Fork Oak Creek and North Fork Oak Creek at 36°49′57″N 118°15′05″W at an elevation of 4,380 feet / 1,335 meters.
