= Fort Independence (California) =

- Owens Valley, California, US
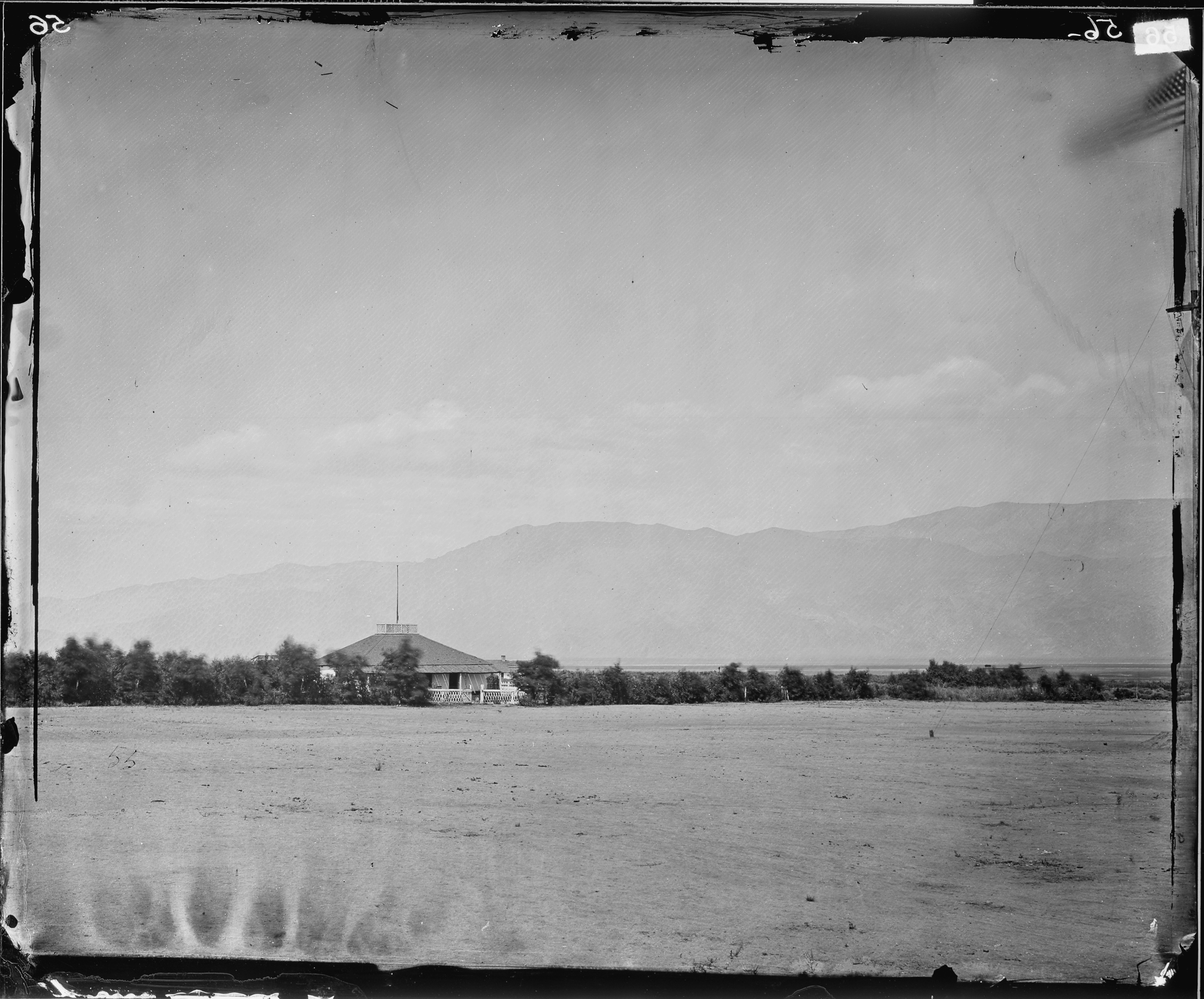
- Camp Independence in the Owens Valley, in 1871.

Site information
- Type: Military post
- Owner: United States Army
- Controlled by: Fort Independence Reservation
- Open to the public: Yes

Location
- Coordinates: 36°50′0.20″N 118°13′17.93″W

Site history
- Built: July 4, 1862
- Fate: Decommission 1877

California Historical Landmark
- Official name: Camp Independence
- Reference no.: 349

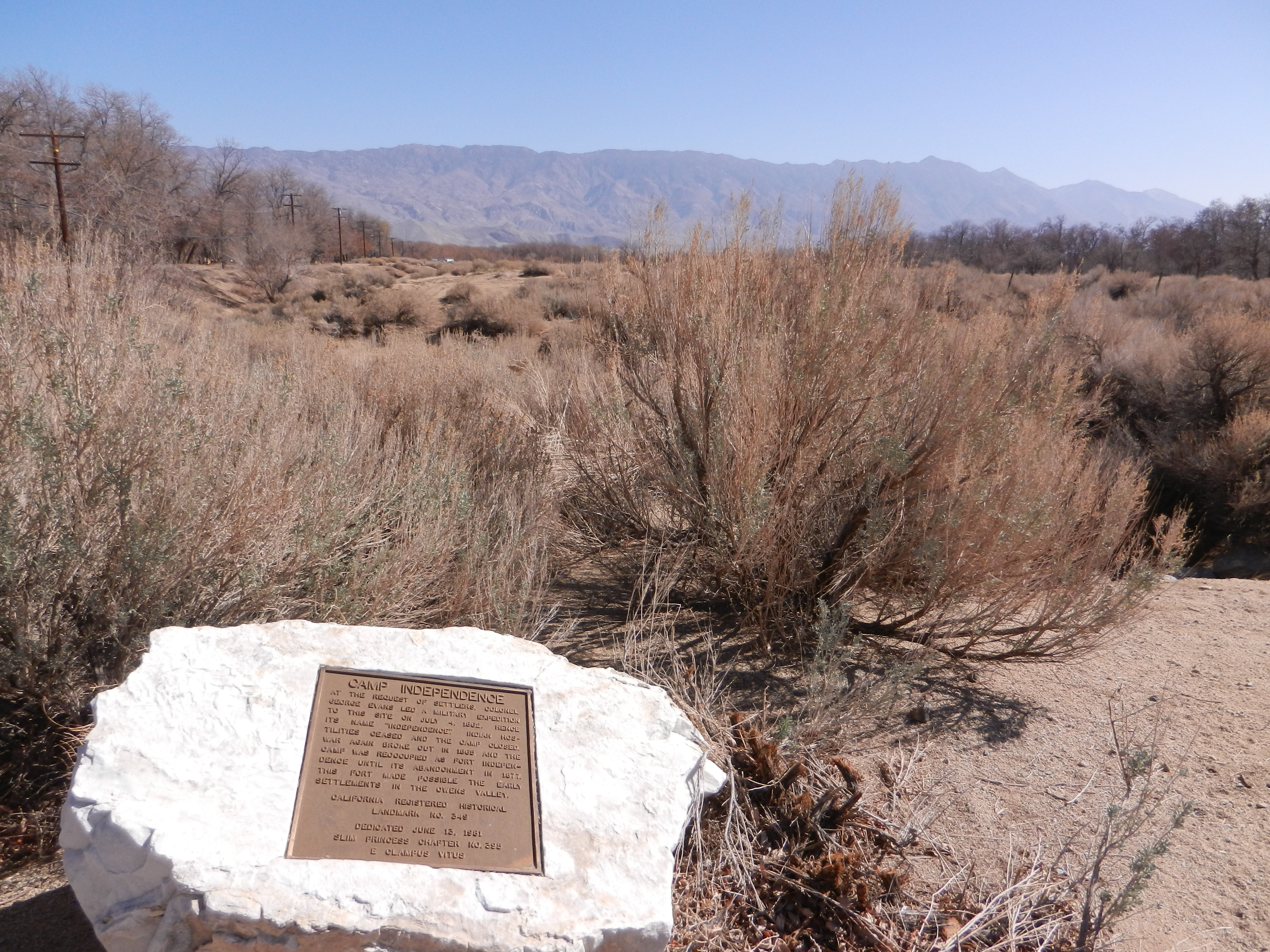
Camp Independence site, with California Historical Landmark plaque.

Fort Independence, originally named Camp Independence, was a fort located in the Owens Valley, 3 miles (4.8 km) north of present-day Independence, Inyo County, eastern California. The U.S. Army post was active from 1862 to 1877.

== History ==
=== Camp Independence ===
Camp Independence was established on Oak Creek in the valley on July 4, 1862, during the Owens Valley Indian War. It also served as an American Civil War army post. The fort was briefly abandoned at the end of hostilities with the Owens Valley Paiute in December 1864.

However, it was reoccupied by the Nevada Volunteers in March 1865, due to renewed conflict with the local Paiute. The post was finally abandoned on July 5, 1877. The military reservation was transferred to the Interior Department for disposition on July 22, 1884.

=== Fort Independence Reservation ===
When the military left the valley, the native Paiute and Shoshone peoples of the area held various allotments of land adjacent to the fort. The Fort Independence Reservation was officially established through executive orders Number 2264 and 2375 in 1915 and 1916. This provided the tribal members with 360 acres (1.5 km^{2}) of land adjacent to Oak Creek in the southern Owens Valley, near the Owens River and town of Independence.

=== Historical landmark ===
The site is a California Historical Landmark, with a historical marker on Highway 395.

== See also ==
- Fort Independence Indian Community of Paiute Indians
- California Historical Landmarks in Inyo County, California
- History of Inyo County, California
