= Owensville, California =

Owensville
- Unincorporated community
- Location in California
- Coordinates: 37°24′03″N 118°20′44″W
- Country: United States
- State: California
- County: Inyo
- Elevation: 4,117 ft (1,255 m)

California Historical Landmark
- Official name: First Permanent White Habitation in Owens Valley
- Reference no.: 230

Owensville (also Glen Mary) is a former settlement in Inyo County, California, United States. It was located west of the future site of the modern-day town of Laws. Owensville was started as a mining camp in 1863. By 1871 it had been abandoned. The former settlement site is on U.S. Route 6 north of Bishop.

A post office operated at Owensville from 1866 to 1870, when it was transferred to Bishop (then called Bishop Creek). From 1868 to 1869, the town was called Glen Mary. The site is now registered as California Historical Landmark #230 as the "First Permanent White Habitation in Owens Valley" assigned on June 20, 1935.

The California Historical Landmark reads:

NO. 230 FIRST PERMANENT WHITE HABITATION IN OWENS VALLEY - In August of 1861, A. Van Fleet and three other men drove their cattle into Owens Valley and prepared to stay. A cabin of sod and stone was built at the big bend of the Owens River at the northern end of the valley.

== See also ==
- California Historical Landmarks in Inyo County
- History of California through 1899
