= Italy Pass =

Coordinates: 37°21′09″N 118°47′01″W

Italy Pass, is a gap at an elevation of 12,408 feet, (3782m) in the Sierra Nevada in Inyo County, California.
