= Bend City, California =

Bend City
- Former settlement
- Location in California Bend City (the United States)
- Coordinates: 36°49′09″N 118°07′50″W
- Country: United States
- State: California
- County: Inyo
- Elevation: 3,740 ft (1,140 m)

California Historical Landmark
- Reference no.: 209

Bend City is a former settlement in Inyo County, California, United States. It was located on the Owens River near the modern-day town of Kearsarge. Founded in 1863, Bend City was originally a mining camp, and was the site of the first county bridge spanning the Owens River. It was once intended to serve as the county seat of Coso County, a predecessor of Inyo County proposed in 1864, but the county was never established. The 1872 Lone Pine earthquake changed the course of the Owens River, diverting it away from the townsite, which by then had already begun to decline. The site is now registered as California Historical Landmark No. 209.

== California Historical Landmark ==
On June 20, 1935, Bend City was designated California Historical Landmark number 209:

The California Historical Landmark reads:

NO. 209 SITE OF BEND CITY - Bend City, a population center in the middle 1860s, was designated as the seat of Coso County, but the county was never formed. It was here that the first county bridge across Owens River was constructed. The 1872 earthquake changed the course of Owens River, so the site of Bend City was near an empty ravine instead of on a river bank.

== See also ==
- California Historical Landmarks in Inyo County
- History of California through 1899
