= Aurora, Nevada =

- Aurora
- U.S. National Register of Historic Places
- U.S. Historic district
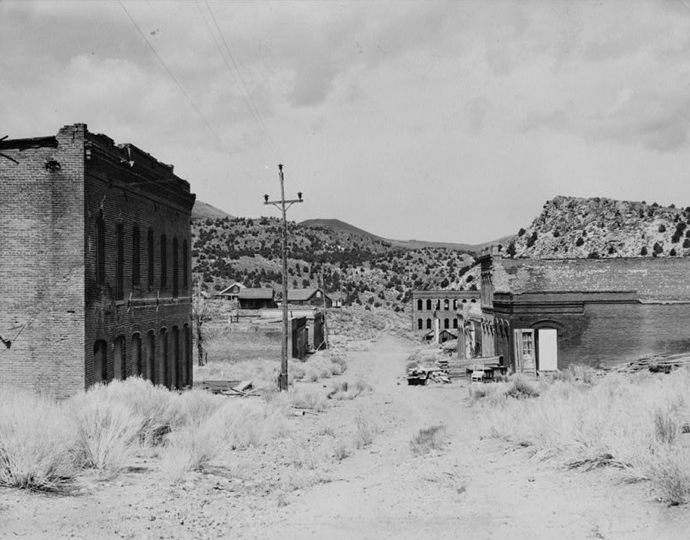
- Aurora, circa 1934

- Location within Nevada Location within the United States
- Nearest city: Hawthorne, Nevada
- Coordinates: 38°17′21″N 118°53′57″W
- Built: 1860
- NRHP reference No.: 74001147
- Added to NRHP: July 30, 1974

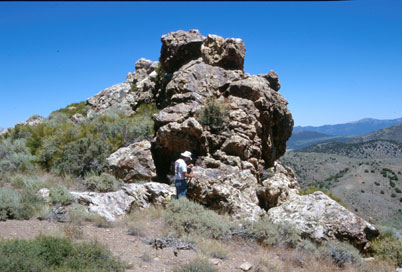
The Esmeralda vein, the discovery outcrop of the Aurora Mining District

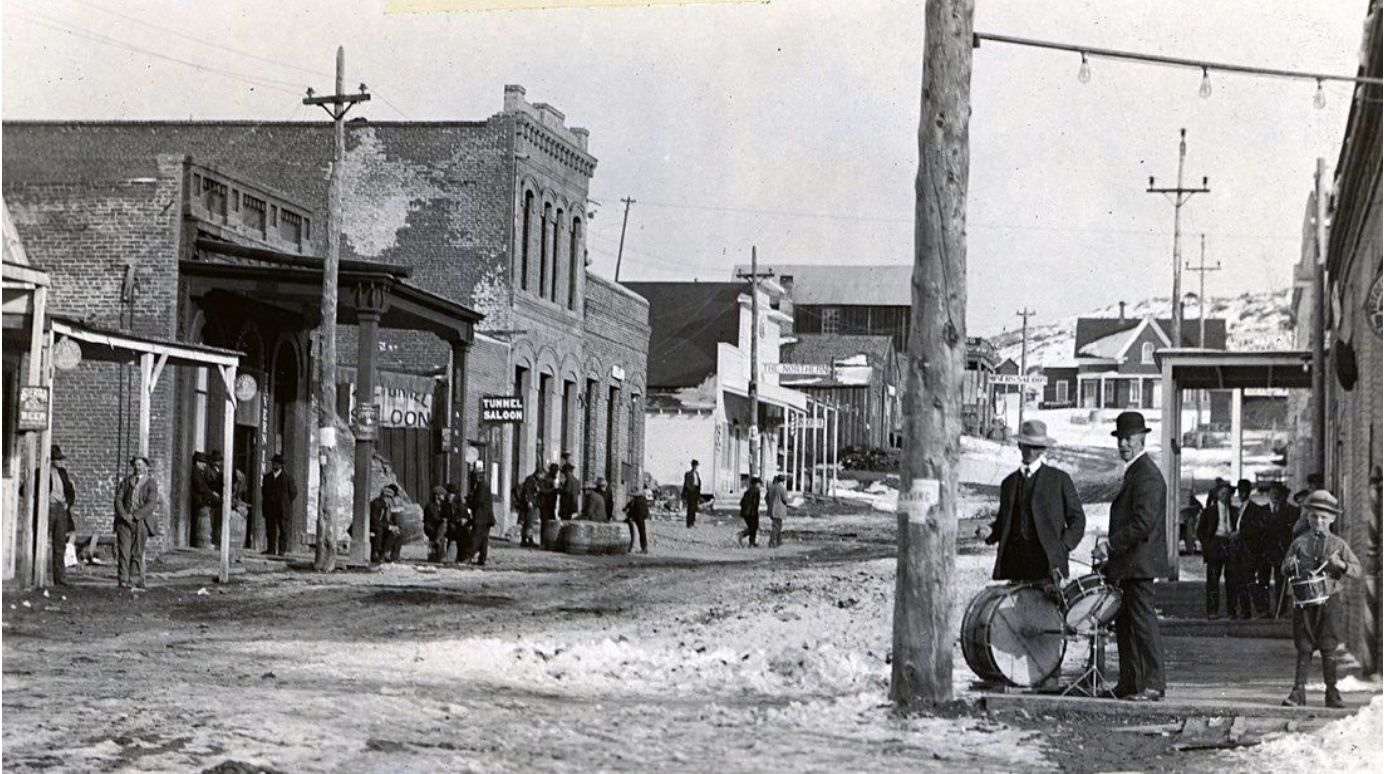
Aurora after 1910, when the town was first connected to electrical power.

Aurora is a ghost town in Mineral County in the west central part of the US state of Nevada, approximately 22 mi (35 km) southwest of the town of Hawthorne, three miles from the California border.

Today the townsite is much diminished, having been damaged by vandals. After World War II many of the buildings were razed for their brick.

The road to Aurora was once difficult to navigate except via four-wheel drive, as the winter snows and spring run-off damaged the road in the canyon leading to the town. In recent years the operations of a nearby mine have improved the road so that even non-4WD vehicles can reach the town site.

== History ==
=== Early Aurora ===
James M. Cory, James M. Braly and E.R. Hicks founded the town in 1860. When Esmeralda County was founded a few years later, Aurora was one of the few places that were explored in the county. Cory is credited with having named the strike Esmeralda but, in the late 1860s, he is reported to have changed the name to Aurora for the goddess of dawn.

Soon after its founding, a small crowd of miners quickly moved into the area after hearing about the deposits in the area. Crude homes and businesses were constructed using mud and other local materials or were easily imported. By April 1861, the population was 1,400, and town lots were selling for around $1,500. By 1862, the city had a newspaper, the Esmeralda Star. In 1864, the population was 6,000. The peak population was roughly 10,000 people.

Prior to 1860 and the discovery of the mines, fewer than 100 people lived in the Aurora area. The biggest rush of population was in the Spring of 1863 after the Wide West Vein provided many jobs. Aurora's mines were so rich that miners came from all over the west. Travel in the spring was much easier than in the winter or colder months. In the Spring of 1863, Aurora had 760 houses, 20 stores, and 22 saloons. Like most mining boom towns, the population had a small number of women and children compared to a large male population.

Travel to Aurora was difficult, but the Mono Trail and the Sonora Pass Route were important paths to Aurora. After it was built, the Esmeralda Toll Road connected Aurora to San Francisco through Carson Valley. This allowed for Aurora to receive supplies directly from San Francisco, which contributed to its growth. As Aurora grew, agriculture grew as well with people farming hay, livestock, dairy products, grain, and vegetables.

=== Peak ===
One source states that Aurora's population reached 5,000 in 1863, while other sources put the peak number at approximately 10,000. Aurora's mines produced $27 million worth of gold by 1869. The town was governed by both California and Nevada until it was determined that the town lay entirely in Nevada. At one point it was simultaneously the county seat of both Mono County, California, and Esmeralda County, Nevada. Its California assemblyman was the Speaker of the California State Assembly while the Nevada legislative member was elected as president of the Nevada Territorial Legislature.

Aurorans quickly learned that the climate was harsh and the weather unpredictable, making life difficult for its residents. The majority of the population was male and saloons were numerous. Gambling houses and brothels were common and provided late night entertainment to the men of the town. There were numerous Chinese brothels that existed on the most public of streets and roughly half the women in the town were prostitutes. Other recreational activities for the men were hunting, fishing, dog fights, and dog and badger fights. Skiing was a recreational activity in the town thanks to the mountains surrounding the town. It was probably the most popular recreational activity among residents.

Violence was a major problem. Most men carried guns and knives daily, and armed conflict was not rare. These conflicts often ended in death. There are numerous examples of disagreements leading to armed violence. Family life was almost non existent due to the low number of women and children in the town. This allowed the men to frequent the saloons, brothels and gambling houses that were in the town.

The town cemetery suffered from vandalism over the years. The most notable destruction was the headstone of William E. Carder, a notorious criminal and gunfighter who, on the night of December 10, 1864, was "assassinated" by a man whom he had threatened in the preceding days. The headstone erected by his wife Annie was toppled by thieves who attempted to steal it, and broken into several pieces, where they now lie sunken into the ground.

=== Decline ===
By 1864, 7 of the 17 quartz mills were shut down and the remaining mills were operating at a fraction of capacity. By 1865, production declined and more mills were shut down. By 1870, half of the town's houses were deserted and most of the mills and buildings had been dismantled.

Aurora had a difficult time maintaining its success due to the nature of the mines. Most mines were less than 100 feet deep, and of minimal endurance. The gold and silver in the area had been completely mined by 1870. Many people deserted the area but left all buildings, stores and homes intact. Eventually, these buildings were stripped of their resources (bricks, lumber, etc.) to be used for fireplaces in California and other building needs. Because of its isolation—Aurora was miles from any major city and surrounded by rugged mountainous terrain—furnishing supplies for the town became difficult. Food, fuel, lumber, machinery, tools, hardware, and clothing were scarce. They had to be shipped in on difficult roads and stage lines. Travel in winter months was very difficult. The town was dominated by a harsh climate with violent and unpredictable weather, which made a permanent settlement increasingly difficult without outside support.

There were a few attempts to revive the city, but those were not successful with the last attempt ending in 1918.

== Current state ==
There are small remains of Aurora in the area. The streets and the foundations of some of the buildings are still somewhat visible. Most of the buildings were dismantled, its materials used in homes in California as used brick became fashionable.

== Notable residents ==
- Mark Twain briefly lived in Aurora, around 1862. The cited article relates that local residents later promoted the Mark Twain connection to encourage tourism and sell curios.

== See also ==
- List of ghost towns in Nevada
