= Keyesville, California =

Unincorporated community in California, United States

Keyesville
- Unincorporated community
- Location in California
- Coordinates: 35°37′33″N 118°30′39″W
- Country: United States
- State: California
- County: Kern
- Established: 1854
- Elevation: 2,848 ft (868 m)

California Historical Landmark
- Reference no.: 98

Keyesville (formerly Keysville and Hogeye) is an unincorporated community in Kern County, California, United States. It is located 2 miles (3.2 km) west of Lake Isabella and the Kern River Valley, at an elevation of 2,848 feet (868 m). Keyesville, founded in 1854, is named for Richard M. Keyes, whose discovery of gold in 1853 started the Kern River Gold Rush. The Keyesville Townsite has been privately owned since the late 1800s and is currently encircled by BLM land Bureau of Land Management.

== History ==
Gold was discovered here in 1853 and the town became a gold hub of Southern California. Still located on the site are the original Post Office, Gold Assayer's office, Mercantile Building, Blacksmith Shop, and one of the brothels. Among the more famous visitors to Keyesville was Grizzly Adams and the "Shootin' Walkers", a family of gunslingers who took up residence here and built the Walker Cabin just outside of the Keyesville townsite, which still stands today. A petition to the commander of Camp Babbitt about the depredations of the local Native Americans led to the Keyesville Massacre nearby on 19 April 1863. The townsite is registered as California Historical Landmark #98.

== Natural history ==
Keyesville lies in the lower elevation Greenhorn Mountains. There are scattered trees and brushy chaparral slopes surrounding it. A number of wildflowers are in evidence in this part of the Greenhorn Mountains, including the yellow mariposa lily, Calochortus luteus, which species is at the southern limit of its range within the Greenhorn Mountains.

== California Historical Landmark ==
The California Historical Landmark reads:

NO. 98 KEYSVILLE - From 1853 until 1870, Keysville was a center of both placer and quartz gold mining. On the knoll just below the townsite may still be seen the outlines of an earthworks fort, built to meet a possible Indian attack in 1863.

== See also ==
- California Historical Landmarks in Kern County
- California Historical Landmark
