= Concow, California =

- Unincorporated community
- Location in Butte County and the state of California

- Location in the United States
- Coordinates: 39°44′14″N 121°30′52″W
- Country: United States
- State: California
- County: Butte

Government
  - U. S. rep.: James Gallagher (R)
  - State senator: Megan Dahle (R)
  - Assemblymember: Vacant
  - County supervisor: Doug Teeter

Area
  - Total: 27.78 sq mi (71.95 km^{2})
  - Land: 27.41 sq mi (70.98 km^{2})
  - Water: 0.37 sq mi (0.97 km^{2}) 1.35%
- Elevation: 2,005 ft (611 m)

Population (2020)
  - Total: 402
  - Density: 14.7/sq mi (5.66/km^{2})
- Time zone: UTC−08:00 (Pacific)
  - Summer (DST): UTC−07:00 (PDT)
- ZIP Code: 95965
- Area code: 530, 837
- FIPS code: 06-16035
- GNIS feature IDs: 1867007, 2407652

Concow (Maidu: Koyoom Kʼawi, meaning "Meadow") is an unincorporated community and census-designated place (CDP) in the Sierra Nevada foothills in Butte County, California, United States. Due to a decline in employment and repeated wildfires, over the past hundred years the population declined from several thousand to several dozen. On November 8, 2018, a wildfire, the Camp Fire, destroyed most of Concow, as well as the adjacent municipality of Paradise. As of the 2020 census, Concow had a population of 402.

Concow is named after the Native American tribe that is indigenous to the area, the Concow Maidu. The original inhabitants ate salmon from the Feather River, acorns and pine nuts, venison, nō-kōm-hē-i'-nē, and other sources of food which abounded in the California foothills.

== History ==
"In the beginning Wahno-no-pem, the Great Spirit, made all things. Before he came, everything on the earth and in the skies was hidden in darkness and in gloom, but where he appeared he was the light. From his essence, out of his breath, he made the sun, the moon, and the countless stars, and pinned them in the blue vault of the heavens."

=== Colonization ===
There is no indication that there was external governance of the Concow region or the tribal peoples that inhabited the region during the 1697–1821 Spanish colonization or the 1821–1846 Mexican era, characterized by the spread of California slave ranchos. The Concow region is 20 miles (30 km) north of the city of Oroville (an Anglo-Hispanic compound meaning 'gold-town') and about the same distance east of the town of Chico; named for Rancho Arroyo Chico—meaning 'little creek ranch.' Rancho Arroyo Chico was established through a land-grant from the Mexican authorities in 1844, two years before California was invaded by United States forces, an indication that there was some Mexican governance near the Concow region, but no indication of governance of the region.

=== Discovery ===
Aside from governance, starting in 1828, northern trappers including Jedediah Smith, Michel Laframboise, and John Work first made contact with the Concow region Maidu. In 1851 the Beckwourth Trail established the first transportation route to the Concow region. The route did not pass directly through the present day Concow, the trail followed a series of ridgetops 10 miles to the East.

Soon began death from diseases, such as pneumonia and malaria, from which the Maidu have no natural immunity.

=== Bounty and extermination ===
The towns of Marysville and Honey Lake paid bounties for Indian scalps. Shasta City authorities offered $5 for every Indian head brought to them.

In 1854, Secretary of War Jefferson Davis wrote California that their 'war' expenditures could not be authorized without the original bills of sale to verify the purpose was one intended by congress. California was reimbursed $924,259.65 ($23.4M 2010US) by the United States Federal Government and again reimbursed $229,981.67 in 1861 for the intervening years.

=== Settlement ===
Permanent settlements soon followed and by 1856 several were well established. The growth of these settlements increased after Charles Curtis constructed a toll bridge (1858) across the Feather River at Nelson's Bar and the next year (1859) an additional bridge was constructed by residents of Whiskey Town over the Feather River just north of the Concow region. Basically, there was a Northernly trail and bridge from present day Oroville, and a Southernly trail and bridge from present day Magalia.

=== Removal of remaining Maidu ===
After a decade of genocide and forcible removals, in 1859 the last of the Kon Kow peoples were forcibly removed by Tehama County ranchers as part of a larger four county 'roundup'. They were held at the Mendocino Reservation until the California Reservation Administration at the camp collapsed due to lack of funding due to the Civil War occurring on the East Coast. The Kon Kow were then deported to the Nome Cult Farms at the Round Valley reservation.

By 1862, the last of the native Concow inhabitants were starving on the cramped Round Valley with unrelated people relocated from surrounding regions. The damp coastal climate on the reservation contrasts with the dry climate of the California "Gold Country" they are accustomed to. It was the midst of the North American Civil War, and federal funds for California Reservations were no longer arriving.

=== Some Maidu leave the reservation ===
In the cooling weather of late September, on September 24, 1862, a combination of the poor camp conditions, forced participation in a massacre of the local Wailaki peoples, warnings by local whites that they were planning to massacre the reservation inhabitants that winter, and an imminent winter disaster (under the supervision of indian agent James Short ) motivated a group of over 400 Maidu to leave the camp.

This group consisted of men, women, children, and elderly individuals. They set out with Tome-ya-nem, without provisions, for the 130 mile hike (210 km) back to their home in the Concow Valley. It was a 10-day hike for well equipped healthy young adults. They made it as far as present day Chico, where Agent Hanson had made an agreement with John Bidwell to stop and encamp the Kon Kow people at Bidwell's old river landing (now under Lake Oroville). Under the supervision of Sub Agent Eddy, they were employed for $.10 per hour ($2.72 2013US) constructing the Chico-Humboldt road and providing labor for various employers in the area.

=== Massacre ===
The following spring three young children were attacked with the two boys killed and the kidnapped girl escaping after being forced to walk to a village near present-day Concow in what became known as the Pence massacre, the murders were within the present day Concow CDP and 9 miles (14.5 km) from Concow Valley - the KonKow people were blamed. These events happened amid documented incidents of local whites dressing as 'indians' and committing crimes and numerous mule-trains that were attacked and plundered by the various sierra peoples; indigenous, Spanish, and whites. All indications are that the children were kidnapped by a small group of native young men. In the following days 611 KonKow people were murdered by a vigilante volunteer posse of 500 white men that sought to kill every non-white in Butte County. M.H. Wells hid 50 Kon Kows in his Yankee Hill store in the foothills above the camp at Bidwell's old river crossing; the vigilante group discovered these people. In a compromise the vigilantes inspected these people and determined four as 'bad people,' they were tied together in pairs and given a running start before the vigilantes opened fire, the rest were taken to the camp - two of the four were shot and killed. Under a resolution passed at a mass meeting of the public at Pence Ranch on July 27 a group of 12 led by Thomas McDonald of Cherokee and M.H. Wells of Yankee Hill found and convinced the remaining people in the surrounding area to go to the Bidwell camp for their own safety. A group of 26 led by G.G. Marquis of Concow, including Mr. Pence from Messilla Valley, B.P. Hutchinson from Cherokee Flat and John Chapman from Cherokee Ravine, gathered funds to cover the expenses for the Kon Kow people's removal. Eventually 461 people including those who returned from Round Valley were gathered at Bidwell's Landing. From this group, for the kidnapping and killing of the Lewis children, two were tied to a tree and executed by firing squad. The local US government representative Major George M. Hanson, Superintendent of Indian Affairs, Northern California, and the State Militia representative Captain Augustus W. Starr sent July 31 to assess the situation were unsure what to do with the popular movement or how to stop the acts of vigilante justice. The subsequent commanders of Camp Bidwell during the month of August, Captain Alfred Morton and then Major Ambrose E. Hooker - are absent in early correspondence from Captain Starr asking for guidance with the increasing number of Konkow 'prisoners of war'.

=== The end ===
After consulting with Superintendent Hanson and superiors Colonel Richard Cloyd Drum and General George Wright, Captain Starr was ordered by General Wright in Post Order No. 6 to lead 23 soldiers of Company F 2nd Regiment California Volunteer Cavalry and move the now imprisoned people the 110 miles (180 km) from Camp Bidwell back to Round Valley on the Nome Cult Trail on what became a 20-day forced death march now remembered as the KonKow Trail of Tears. Despite efforts by the soldiers and the Pence resolution mandated donations of food and shelter provisions, horses and wagons, each day those who could not make the march through the hot arid early September Sacramento Valley - where afternoon temperatures top 90 °F (32 °C) or over the 6,000 foot (1,800 m) crest of the North Coast Ranges - were left behind without food or water and were soon killed by a pack of wild boar that formed behind and followed the group; the survivors were told to stay at the Round Valley concentration camp or be shot on sight. They were given no provisions by the soldiers and starved to death during the winter.

=== Bands of rogue natives ===
In 1864 a band of Kon Kow Maidu left the Round Valley reservation and again headed back to their home. The reservation agent sent a letter to the Concow post office noting their departure and that they seemed 'hostile.' What became of this band is not known, the following year in August a group of 25 Kon Kow were attacked and killed after a robbery that included two murders at the Robert Workman home; this became known as the Three Knolls Massacre and is seen as a smaller episode of the Mill Creek War. And the following year in February, another 5 Kon Kow were killed as continued retribution for the previous years murders.

=== Relics of Maidu ===
The current inhabitants of Concow, including a few Maidus, commonly find relics of the Maidu in the form of beads and stone tools while digging in and around their homes. There is no monument, plaque, or other recognition in Concow Valley to memorialize the fate of the KonKow people. Few if any of the current inhabitants are aware of the history.

=== Commune era ===
While a post office operated at Concow from 1882 to 1906, renamed from Con Cow to Concow in 1895, and relocated several times, the region was sparsely populated and dominated by a few ranching families. The economy of the region rose and fell with the gold rush need for supplies, the civil war demand for pine turpentine, logging, and the water way that allowed for ranching. The economy ebbed and flowed for a hundred years under the constraint of the difficult access to the region.

In 1962 a new four-lane alignment of California State Route 70 wrapped around the western side of the then proposed Lake Oroville and reconnected with the existing highway 70 at Jarbo Gap.

=== Wildfires ===
Beginning in 2000, a series of progressively larger fires burned through Concow.

==== 2000 fire ====
A fire burned on September 19–20, 2000. The fire destroyed 14 structures. The first and smallest Concow fire of the 2000s, this fire was a 2,000 acre fire. At the time, it was considered a large fire.

==== 2008 fire ====
In June 2008, as part of the Butte Lightning Complex Fires, a 60,000 acre (large fire) wildfire destroyed 250 structures. Of those structures, 220 were unpermitted and either were not built to building codes, did not bother with building inspections, or did not use approved building materials. Because of the back-to-the-land nature of the community, affording construction following building codes was not possible initially and reconstruction to building codes is not possible or within the ethos of the community. The county offered special waivers for reconstruction, but the community was already gutted. Those who remain are a shadow of the original community.

==== 2012 fire ====
On September 26, 2012, at 3:10 PM, a wildfire burned 60 acres on Concow Rd at Jordan Hill Rd. CAL FIRE, El Medio Fire, Oroville Fire, USFS, and Butte Co. Fire Volunteers extinguished the fire. 120 total personnel were called to tend to the fire.

==== 2018 fire ====
On November 8, 2018, a fire was reported at 6:33 a.m. PST, close to Camp Creek Road near Pulga. Shortly after the fire erupted, the Butte County Sheriff's Office ordered evacuations of surrounding communities and switched to life saving operations. On the first day, much of the town of Paradise and community of Concow were destroyed. As of December 13, Butte County Sheriff's Department reported that at least 6 people died in Concow during the Camp Fire. A fallen tree blocked the primary evacuation route from the town and some residents survived by jumping into the creek.

== Geography ==
According to the United States Census Bureau, the CDP has a total area of 28 square miles (73 km^{2}), of which 27 square miles (70 km^{2}) is land and 0.4 square miles (1.0 km^{2}) (1.4%) is water.

For unknown reasons the community's name was absent from the US Geological Survey files until 1990. Other nearby communities are The Pines (USGS feature ID 268203), and Deadwood (USGS feature ID 1655957).

The community is located off State Route 70, north of Cherokee. The infrastructure is minimal. There is Concow Elementary School, Concow Dam and Reservoir, and the primary paved access route - Concow Road.

== Demographics ==
Historical population
Census	Pop.	Note	%±
1870	490		—
1990	1,392		—
2000	1,095		−21.3%
2010	710		−35.2%
2020	402		−43.4%
U.S. Decennial Census; 1850–1870 1880-1890; 1900 1910 1920; 1930 1940 1950; 1960 1970 1980; 1990 2000 2010

Concow first appeared as a census-designated place in the 1990 United States census. At first contact with native peoples in Concow the population was over 1,000, however, it was noted that the population had been higher and the people were sick with cholera. The 1850 and 1860 populations are largely the Concow people which declined due to massacre and deportation.

=== Racial and ethnic composition ===
Concow CDP, California – Racial and ethnic composition Note: the US Census treats Hispanic/Latino as an ethnic category. This table excludes Latinos from the racial categories and assigns them to a separate category. Hispanics/Latinos may be of any race.
Race / Ethnicity (NH = Non-Hispanic)	Pop 2000	Pop 2010	Pop 2020	% 2000	% 2010	% 2020
White alone (NH)	966	589	302	88.22%	82.96%	75.12%
Black or African American alone (NH)	10	0	10	0.91%	0.00%	2.49%
Native American or Alaska Native alone (NH)	22	19	2	2.01%	2.68%	0.50%
Asian alone (NH)	2	5	21	0.18%	0.70%	5.22%
Native Hawaiian or Pacific Islander alone (NH)	6	3	0	0.55%	0.42%	0.00%
Other race alone (NH)	0	0	3	0.00%	0.00%	0.75%
Mixed race or Multiracial (NH)	37	38	32	3.38%	5.35%	7.96%
Hispanic or Latino (any race)	52	56	32	4.75%	7.89%	7.96%
Total	1,095	710	402	100.00%	100.00%	100.00%

=== 2020 census ===
In 2018, the Camp Fire destroyed nearly all of Concow.

As of the 2020 census, Concow had a population of 402, down from 710 in 2010. The median age was 50.3 years. 13.7% of residents were under the age of 18 and 25.6% of residents were 65 years of age or older. For every 100 females there were 162.7 males, and for every 100 females age 18 and over there were 166.9 males age 18 and over.

0.0% of residents lived in urban areas, while 100.0% lived in rural areas.

There were 198 households in Concow, of which 11.6% had children under the age of 18 living in them. Of all households, 30.3% were married-couple households, 40.9% were households with a male householder and no spouse or partner present, and 18.7% were households with a female householder and no spouse or partner present. About 43.4% of all households were made up of individuals and 14.7% had someone living alone who was 65 years of age or older.

There were 305 housing units, of which 35.1% were vacant. The homeowner vacancy rate was 4.4% and the rental vacancy rate was 0.0%.

=== 2010 census ===
In 2008, the Butte Lightning Complex fire destroyed 308 homes which was 54 percent of the housing. In the 2010 census, "the biggest [regional] percentage drop was in fire-scarred Concow, down 35 percent to a population of 710."

The 2010 census, counted 710 people in 360 households, forming 178 family units. The population density was 26 inhabitants per square mile (10.0/km^{2}), and the housing density was 13 per square mile (5.0/km^{2}). Of housing units, 30 percent included children under the age of 18. Of family units; 59 percent included children under 18 years old; 82 percent were husband-wife unions. The racial makeup was 85 percent White, as individuals there were 28 Native Americans, and 57 Latinos.

=== 2000 census ===
The 2000 census counted 1,095 people in 571 housing units and forming 319 families. The population density was 29 people per square mile (11.2/km^{2}), and a housing density of 15 per square mile (5.9/km^{2}). Of households, 24 percent included children under the age of 18; half were married couples, 8 percent had a female head of household, and 30 percent were non-families; 23 percent were individuals, and of those a third were over 65 years old. The median family income was $41,250, and the per capita income was $15,829. That placed 27 percent of those under age 18 and 14 percent of the population below the poverty line. The racial makeup was 91 percent White. As individuals, there were, 10 African Americans, 25 Native Americans, and 52 Latinos.

== Economy ==
=== Historically ===
Historically the Concow region supported hunter-gatherer societies, turpentine extraction, dairy farming, ranching, forestry, water supply, and in the areas outside the granite sands - Quartz reef mining and related industries. The region is zoned (2010 map) for timber production, 5 to 10ac foothill residential, a small area for 1ac foothill residential, and a couple small areas for commercial.

=== Informal market ===
In the 1980s and 1990s, the CDP became known regionally for a significant domestic product consisting of informal market production and commerce.

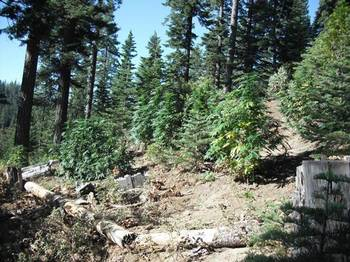
Typical Concow Marijuana Garden (2013)

Most of the informal market production consists of marijuana agricultural production. Large irrigated plantations were discovered during the 2008 fire.

The 2000 domestic product from legitimate income sources is approximately $17.5 million. During and after the 2008 fires, an estimated $50 million worth of marijuana was removed, indicating that the region's per-capita income is under-reported. The region's marijuana production is 1/3 of 1% of California's $14 billion (2013) dollar total production. At the 2010 population of 710, that is a per capita income of $70,000 per person. The 2008 fire burned most of the protective, shaded forest overstory, converting the vegetation to mostly exposed, sunny and hot chaparral. This changed the microclimate growing conditions, resulting in a drop in crop yields.

=== Change in economy ===
With the destruction of most unpermitted structures and forest during the 2008 fire, the pattern of residences, commercial land use, informal and formal market industries, and recreational use has changed. There has not been any large-scale residential development in the Concow region. The baby boomer 'bulge' was expected to result in a steady stream of retirees into the region. To date, however, the population has declined despite the retirees.

== Education ==
It is in the Golden Feather Union Elementary School District and the Oroville Union High School District.

The Concow Elementary School, of the Golden Feather district, is located in the community.

== Notable people ==
- Bill Godbout, early computer pioneer, died during the Camp Fire in 2018.
