= Columbus Sims =

Columbus Sims (1829–1869) was an American lawyer and Colonel of California Volunteers in the American Civil War.

== Biography ==
Columbus Sims was born in South Carolina. He came to Los Angeles, California, in 1852. A popular attorney, he was known for an incident in which he threw an inkstand at his opponent during an altercation in court, an act of contempt of court that did not result in his disbarment. In 1853, he served as a United States District Attorney, Pro Tem, in Oregon. Later, he acted as attorney for Pancho Daniel, leader with Juan Flores of the Flores Daniel Gang on trial for the murder of Los Angeles County Sheriff James R. Barton, until sickness compelled him to retire from the case. From 1856 to 1860, he was the Clerk of the United States District Court for the Southern District of California. On May 4, 1859, Sims, with other influential men like A. J. King and Henry D. Barrows, served on a committee to raise funds to build the first Protestant church in Los Angeles.

In early 1861, during the beginning of the American Civil War, Sims, although a Southerner by birth, was President of the Los Angeles Union Club. On September 10, 1861, he was appointed Lt. Colonel of the 2nd Regiment California Volunteer Cavalry, and placed in charge of Camp Alert at the Pioneer Race Course in San Francisco, where the twelve cavalry companies of the Second Cavalry were assembled. Two months later, on November 13, 1861, he was promoted to Colonel of the Second Cavalry following the resignation of his predecessor Andrew J. Smith.

Late in December 1861 in San Francisco, Colonel Sims had an altercation with D. D. Colton. Blows were exchanged, and Sims drew a deadly weapon. He was arrested and held to await the action of the Grand Jury; however, no serious consequences ensued for the belligerent Sims, who retained his command. In August 1862, he marched his command to join Colonel Patrick Edward Connor at Fort Ruby, Nevada. On the way, his troops reached a state of near-mutiny, with many deserting. After they reached Fort Ruby, Col. Connor took charge of the Regiment in response to the pleas of its officers and men not to leave them under Sims's command, with the officers predicting mass desertion if that happened. Sims was relieved of his command by the Department of the Pacific on August 19, 1862, to await further orders; he was replaced by Major Edward McGarry. Col. Connor was ordered to investigate Sims's conduct. Sims resigned his command on January 31, 1863.

Following his resignation of his command, he returned to San Francisco and the practice of law. He died on August 14,1869, in Hamilton, White Pine County, Nevada.
