= Senator McGarry =

Senator McGarry may refer to:

- Edward McGarry (soldier) (1820–1867), California State Senate
- Edward McGarry (Wisconsin politician) (1817–1899), Wisconsin State Senate
- Peter J. McGarry (1871–1940), New York State Senate
