= George S. Evans =

American politician

George Spafford Evans
- Born: August 8, 1826; Tecumseh, Michigan, U.S.
- Died: September 17, 1883 (aged 57); San Francisco, California, U.S.
- Military career
- Allegiance: United States of America: Union
- Branch: United States Army; Union Army; California Militia
- Rank: Brigadier General
- Unit: Texas Rangers
- Commands: 2nd California Cavalry Regiment; Adjutant-General of California
- Conflicts: Mexican–American War; American Indian Wars; American Civil War

George Spafford Evans (August 8, 1826 – September 17, 1883) was a military officer, miner, businessman, county clerk for Tuolumne County, customs official, and clerk for the California State Senate.

== Early life ==
Born on August 8, 1826, in Tecumseh, Michigan, George S. Evans came to California in 1849 from Texas, where he had served in the Texas Rangers during the Mexican–American War. He was involved in mining, business, and later in government work for both Tuolumne County and the State of California. He married Fannie Markham of Sonora in 1857 and they would have six children.

== Civil War ==
After the outbreak of the American Civil War, on October 16, 1861, Evans, joined the California Volunteers with the "Tuolumne Rangers" at Camp Alert in San Francisco. This unit later became Company E of the 2nd California Volunteer Cavalry. He was commissioned as a major.

Promoted a lieutenant colonel, he led the regiment during their first two campaigns in the Owens Valley Indian War and later in Utah Territory where he was promoted to colonel of the regiment; receiving the brevet for brigadier general.

I have the honor to report to the general commanding the Department of the Pacific that I have been in this valley fifteen days, carrying out my instructions to chastise these Indians, or the Indians of Owens River; that I have killed several, taken eleven prisoners, and destroyed a great many rancherias and a large quantity of seeds, worms, &c., that the Indians had gathered for food.

— George S. Evans, Lieutenant-Colonel Second Cavalry California Volunteers, Commanding Owens River Expedition, War of the Rebellion: OPERATIONS ON THE PACIFIC COAST. Chapter LXII.

In late 1863 he resigned his commission and returned to California, where he was elected to the California State Senate in September. He was appointed Adjutant General of California in July 1864, with the rank of brigadier general. He continued in that office until May 1, 1868.

== Later life ==
He was elected again to the state senate in September 1865, while holding the office of adjutant general. After serving as adjutant general, Evans served as Stockton City Councilman (1869), then mayor of Stockton (1870). He was then elected again to the California State Senate in consecutive terms from 1871 to 1877. He was a Candidate for Senate President Pro Tem in 1874 and 1878. He made an unsuccessful bid to be the Republican Party's gubernatorial candidate in 1880. He then moved to San Francisco with his family in 1880, after he was appointed as the State Harbor Commissioner. He remained there until his death in 1883. He died in San Francisco on September 17, 1883, with California newspapers reporting that he had died from either a morphine overdose or stroke.

== See also ==
- List of American Civil War brevet generals (Union)

== Research resources ==
- Online guide to the Bohnett-Evans Family Papers, 1853-1994, The Bancroft Library
- George S. Evans, from www.joincalifornia.com, accessed December 17, 2011
