= Edward McGarry =

Edward McGarry may refer to:

- Edward McGarry (soldier) (1820–1867), American cavalryman and California legislator
- Edward McGarry (Wisconsin politician) (1817–1899), Wisconsin legislator
