= Summit Lake Paiute Tribe of Nevada =

Summit Lake Paiute Tribe
Agaipaninadökadö
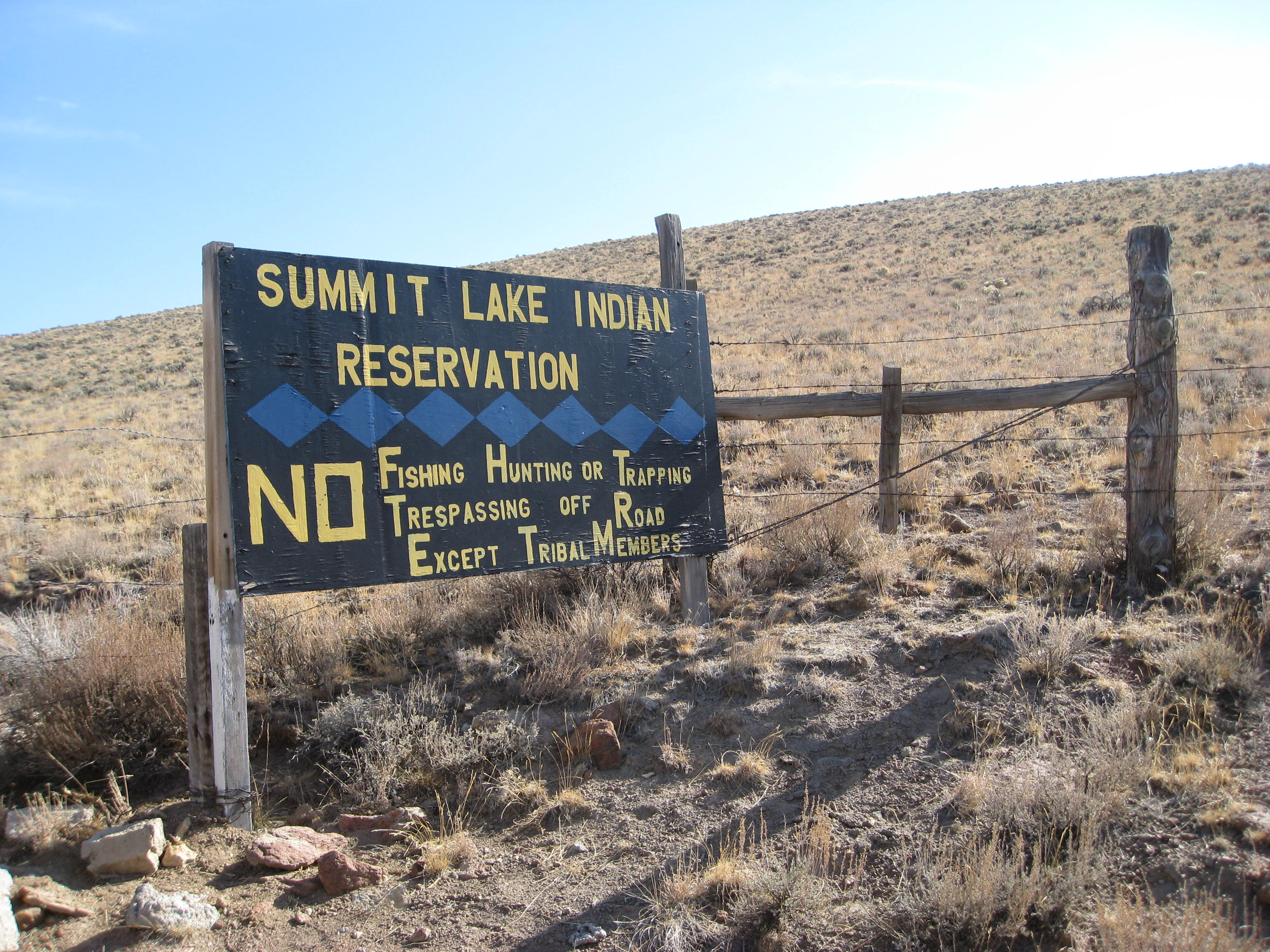
- Sign at Summit Lake Indian Reservation

Total population
- 120

Regions with significant populations
- United States (Nevada)

Languages
- Northern Paiute, English

Religion
- Indigenous, Christianity

The Summit Lake Paiute Tribe of Nevada is a federally recognized tribe of Northern Paiute Indians in northwest Nevada. Their autonym in their language is Agaipaninadökadö (Agai Panina Ticutta), meaning "Fish Lake Eaters." They are traditionally known as the "Fish Eaters."

The Summit Lake Paiute Tribe has a federal reservation, the Summit Lake Indian Reservation, at 41°31′27″N 119°03′08″W in Humboldt County, Nevada. The reservation was established in 1913 and is 12,573 acres (50.9 km^{2}), with 10,098 acres (40.9 km^{2}) of trust lands. At a remote northwest corner of Nevada, the tribe is the most isolated among the nine federally recognized tribes in the state.

In October 2016, a federal law was passed to put approximately 941 acres (3.81 km^{2}) acres of Bureau of Land Management (BLM) land into trust for the Tribe in order to expand their reservation; this was done under the Nevada Native Nations Land Act. Gaming is prohibited on the new lands.

== Reservation ==
Location of the Summit Lake Indian Reservation in Nevada

The Summit Lake Indian Reservation is located at 41°31′27″N 119°03′08″W in Humboldt County, Nevada. The reservation was established in 1913 and is 12,573 acres (50.9 km^{2}), with 10,098 acres (40.9 km^{2}) of trust lands. In 1990, 6 tribal members lived on the reservation. In 1992, 112 people were enrolled in the tribe. Summit Lake is part of the reservation. There is no safe source of drinking water on the reservation.

Under the Nevada Native Nations Land Act, passed in October 2016, Bureau of Land Management (BLM) land and Forest Service lands in the state are being put into trust by the Department of Interior for six federally recognized tribes, to expand their reservations. Among them, Summit Lake Paiute Tribe will have 941 acres (3.81 km^{2}) of BLM land put into trust for its reservation. Gaming is prohibited on the new lands.

== History ==
Traditionally, before European-American contact, the Agai Panina Ticutta peoples controlled an area of 2,800 square miles (7,300 km^{2}) around the borders of what is defined as present-day Nevada, California, and Oregon. Other bands of Paiute, Shoshone and Bannock held territory throughout Nevada and southwestern Oregon.

Their lands were unilaterally seized by the United States (US) government following the American Civil War. In 1867 this property became part of a military reservation, Camp McGarry. After ending activities in this area, the military abandoned this camp in 1871. The buildings of Camp McGarry still standing have become tribal property.

During the 1880s through the early 1900s, the state of Nevada did not allow Indian children to attend state public schools. The federal government forced tribal children to attend Indian boarding schools at Fort Bidwell, California; Stewart, Nevada; and the Sherman Institute at Riverside, California. These were intended to assimilate children to the majority culture; they were required to speak English at school and were mixed with children of many other tribes. To keep their children in their families, many tribal members moved away from the reservation. They sometimes joined growing Indian colonies on the outskirts of cities where the parents could find work. Some of these, such as the Reno-Sparks Indian Colony, have since been formally recognized by the federal government as tribes.

The current tribal reservation was created on January 14, 1913, by President Woodrow Wilson's Executive Order number 1681, which set aside 5,026 acres (20.3 km^{2}) in trust for the tribe.

On October 24, 1964, the Agai Panina Ticutta Tribe of the Northern Paiute Nation voted to give up their traditional form of government, with hereditary chiefs. They created a new elected government under the 1934 Indian Reorganization Act. Following this action, they received federal recognition as the Summit Lake Paiute Tribe on January 8, 1965.

== Today ==
The Summit Lake Paiute's tribal headquarters is located in Sparks, Nevada. They have a government-to-government relationship with the US federal government. As of May 2024, a total of 205 people are enrolled in the tribe. Their priority is protection of their natural and environmental resources. Outsiders are not allowed to hunt or fish on the reservation.

The tribe is governed by an elected five-person Tribal Council, including the chairperson. They are elected for three-year terms.
