= Union Race Course =

Coordinates: 37°45′26″N 122°24′56″W

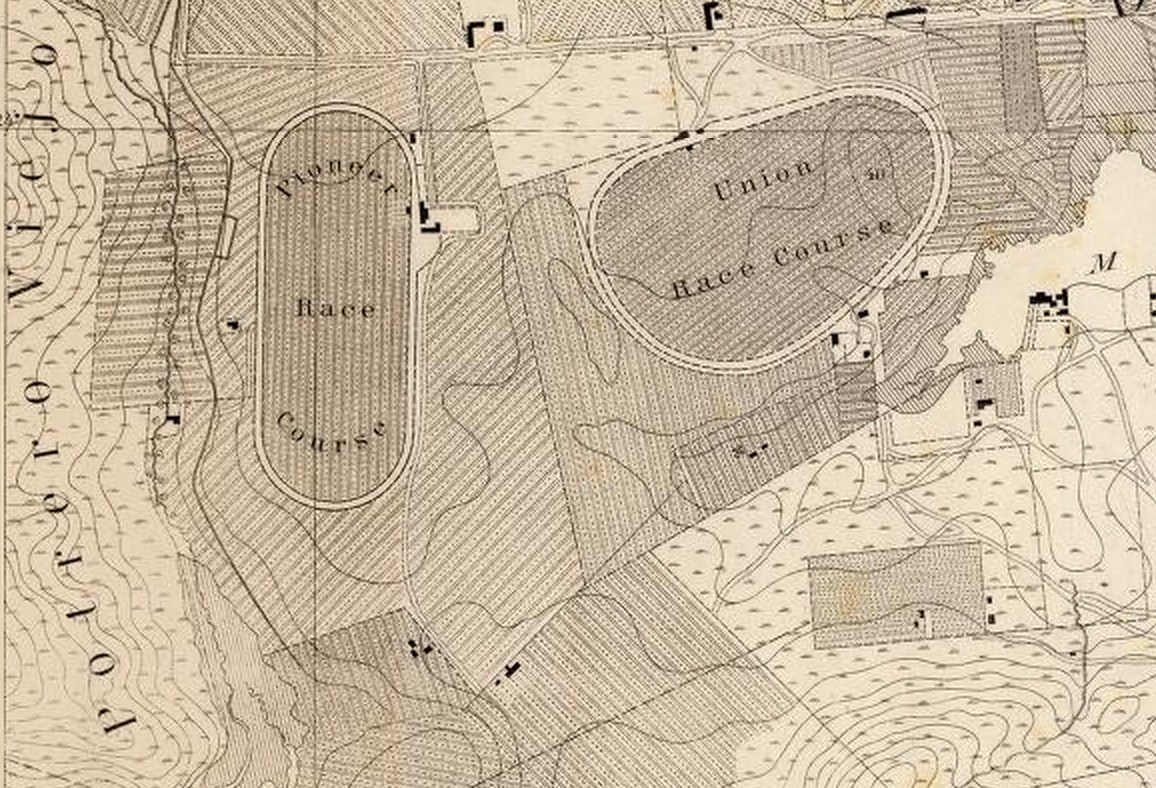
- 1857 Map of the Mission District showing the Pioneer and Union Race Courses (West at top of map). U.S. Coast Survey A.D. Bache, Superintendent. City Of San Francisco And Its Vicinity California. From a plane label survey by A.F. Rogers Sub-assistant. Verified W.R. Palmer Capt. Topl. Engrs. Asst. C.S. In charge of Office. Lith. of J. Bien 60 Fulton St. N.Y.
- Location: San Francisco, California, United States
- Date opened: 1850s
- Date closed: July 18, 1863

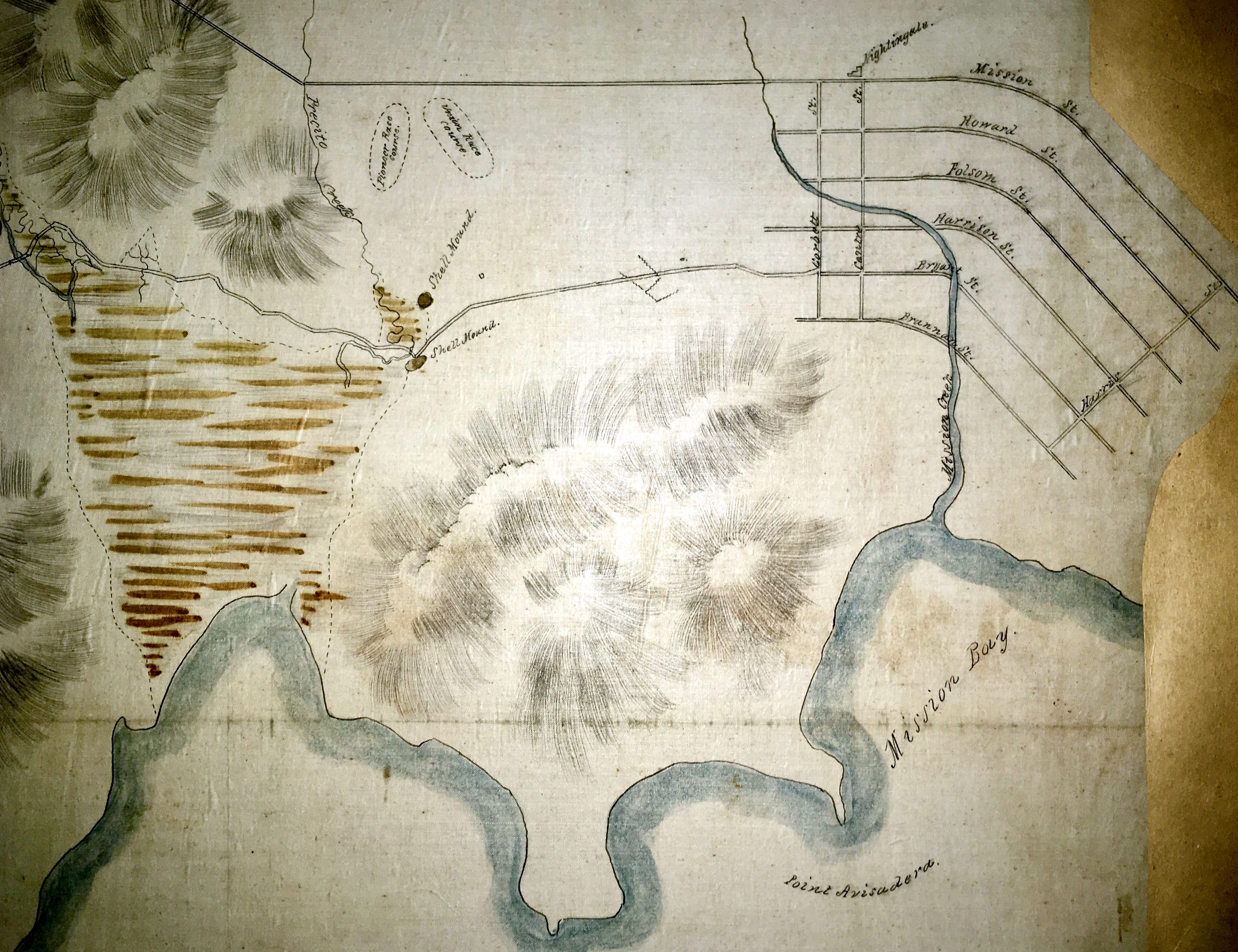
Mission District San Francisco 1850s

Union Race Course was a horse racing track opened in the 1850s in San Francisco, California located in the Mission District. There were two horse race courses in the Mission District at this time, the other being Pioneer Race Course which was located a few blocks away. At the time it was planned to be built, no streets existed in this neighborhood but later it appears to be bound by 19th St to 23rd St and Capp St to Harrison St.

The half mile track was renovated in 1862, moved slightly to softer ground and renamed 'Willows Trotting Park' but the increasing value of the land for housing proved too much. The final horse race was run at Union Race Course on July 18, 1863.

The positioning of this race course, as well as the earlier built race course called Pioneer Race Course appear to have affected the placement of the San Francisco-San Jose Railway.
