= Camp McGarry =

US military camp in Nevada

Location
- Location within Nevada
- Coordinates: 41°32′37″N 119°01′33″W

Site history
- Built: 1865
- In use: 1868
- Fate: Became part of the Summit Lake Indian Reservation (1871)

Camp McGarry was a U.S. military camp located in what is now the Summit Lake Indian Reservation in Humboldt County, Nevada.

== History ==
Camp McGarry was established as a field camp on November 23, 1865. It was named for Brevet Brigadier General Edward McGarry. With a size of 75 sq mi (190 km^{2}) it was, at the time, the largest military reserve in Nevada. In 1866 the headquarters of the district of Nevada were moved from Fort Churchill to Camp McGarry. In the summer of 1868, the bulk of the troops were moved from Camp McGarry, with the camp being abandoned on December 18, 1868. On March 25, 1871, the camp was relinquished by the Army and turned over to the U.S. Department of the Interior for use as the Summit Lake Indian Reservation.

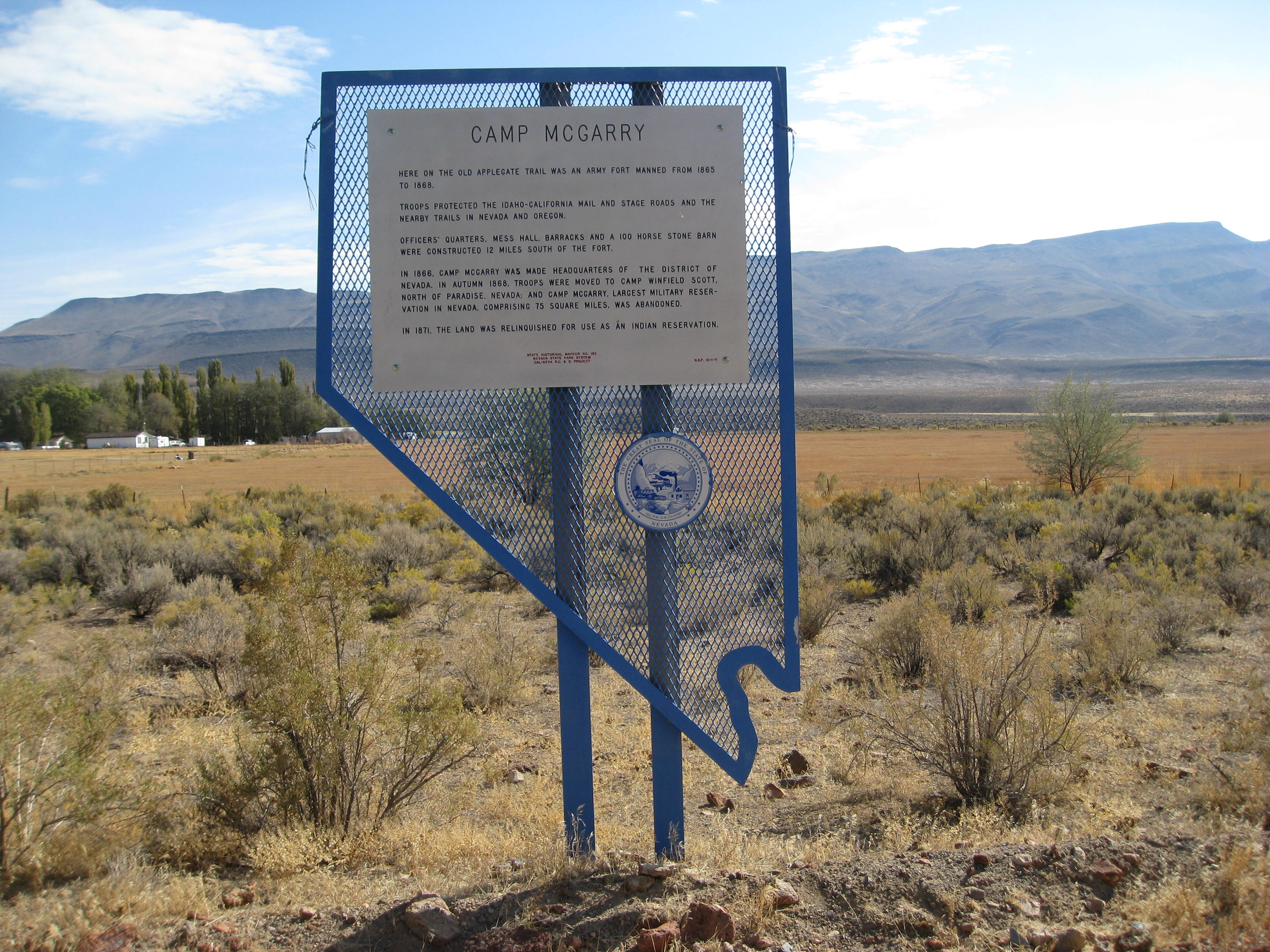
Camp McGarry Historical Marker, located at Soldiers Meadows
