= George Treat =

- Born: April 16, 1819; Frankfort, Maine, U.S.
- Died: May 1907; San Francisco, California, U.S.
- Occupation: Businessperson; Abolitionist

George Treat (1819–1907) was an early Gold Rush-era pioneer in the Mission District, of San Francisco, a businessman, abolitionist, a member of the first Committee of Vigilance of San Francisco, and a horse racing enthusiast. He was influential in the early physical development of the Mission District and its eventual shift to urbanization. Treat was responsible for the construction and management of the Pioneer Race Course, a horse racing track built in San Francisco in 1851, and for helping with the creation of the San Francisco-San Jose Railway when he sold the land.

== Early life ==
Born in Frankfort, Maine, on April 16, 1819, the son of Joshua and Sarah (née Sweetser) Treat, he left the state of Maine in his early youth. In 1835 he settled in New Orleans and remained there until 1847, when he and his brother John Treat enlisted in the United States Army and went to Mexico shortly before the Mexican-American War ended. George Treat was married on April 19, 1857, to Clarinda Littlefield, daughter of Rufus Batchelder, of Prospect, Maine. They had five children: May Benton (the late Mrs. Alexander F. Morrison), Clara Littlefield, Sara Batchelder (Mrs. George R. Child, who lives in San Francisco), Rosa, and Frank Livingston Treat.

== San Francisco ==
After his discharge he came to California, reaching San Francisco on August 10, 1849, and the brothers settled in the remote corner of the southeastern Mission valley (in the neighborhood now called the Mission district) and raised food for the city markets.

In the 1850s George Treat acquired much of the Mission District south of 24th Street and the western portion of the Potrero District from the heirs of the Californio (ranching villages featuring adobe and wood structures) and Mexican families that had owned it since the secularization of Mission Dolores in 1834. Many of the land dealings were underhand or coercive and ultimately resulted in the demise of the vast Mexican-era cattle ranches that encompassed the Potrero and Mission districts.

In 1867, George Treat provided testimony at the U.S. Board of Land Commissioners' that ultimately resulted in the denial of the De Haro family's longstanding land claims, and his action caused the De Haro family to lose their ranch named Rancho Potrero Viejo, effectively opening it for residential and industrial development. George Treat was later prominent in business circles in San Francisco with his mining enterprises in Nevada and Mexico.

A known minstrel song of the period "I Wish I Were a Bee" had a verse added, in direct reference to losing gambling money at Treat's horse race track with his famous racehorse named Katie Pease. Treat was a known horse breeder, primarily for race horses for his race tracks around San Francisco. He was also the first person to import Angora goats to California.

The former home built by George and brother, John Treat was located on Capp Street in 1861 (the date of construction of the building is unknown) but then the wooden building was later moved to its current address of 1266 Hampshire Street. Treat Avenue in San Francisco is named after George Treat and is within the former location of the Treat Tract homestead.

He died in San Francisco in May 1907.
