= Nelson Bar, California =

Nelson Bar
- Former settlement
- Location in California
- Coordinates: 39°41′45″N 121°33′41″W
- Country: United States
- State: California
- County: Butte
- Elevation: 974 ft (297 m)

Nelson Bar is a former settlement in Butte County, California, United States. It was located 5.25 miles (8.45 km) southeast of Paradise on the West Branch of the Feather River, at an elevation of 974 feet (297 m). It is now under Lake Oroville. The Nelson Bar bridge spanned the West Branch of the Feather River until Oroville Dam was built. It was submerged under Lake Oroville.
