= Camp Bidwell =

U.S. Army post during the American Civil War

Coordinates: 39.7860°N 122.0060°W

Camp Bidwell, later Camp Chico, was a U.S. Army post during the American Civil War. Camp Bidwell was named for John Bidwell, the founder of the nearby town of Chico, California, and a brigadier general of the California Militia. It was established a mile outside Chico, by Lt. Col. Ambrose E. Hooker with Company A, 6th California Infantry, on August 26, 1863. Although a Company F, 2nd California Cavalry and Company K, 2nd California Infantry under Captain Augustus W. Starr had been there from July 31, 1863, Lt. Col. Hooker moved the camp to a new location for its better defense and for better sanitation.

By early 1865, it was being referred to as Camp Chico when a post called Camp Bidwell was established in the far northeastern corner of California, later to be named Fort Bidwell. Observing confusion between the two, Robert W. Pease explained that such a transfer of name between outposts was a common Army practice of the time.

== Commanders ==
- Lt. Colonel Ambrose E. Hooker, August 26, 1863 – October 20, 1863
- Captain Augustus W. Starr, October 20, 1863 – April 1864
- Captain James C. Doughty, June 1864 – May 1865

== Garrison ==
- Company F, 2nd California Cavalry, July 1863 – April 1864
- Company K, 2nd California Infantry, August 16, 1863 – October 26, 1863
- Company A, 6th California Infantry, August 26, 1863 – October 20, 1863
- Company B, 1st Battalion California Volunteer Mountaineers, May 1864?
- Company I, 2nd California Cavalry, June 1864 – May 1865
