= Pioneer Race Course =

Former horse race track in San Francisco, California

Coordinates: 37°45′5″N 122°24′58″W

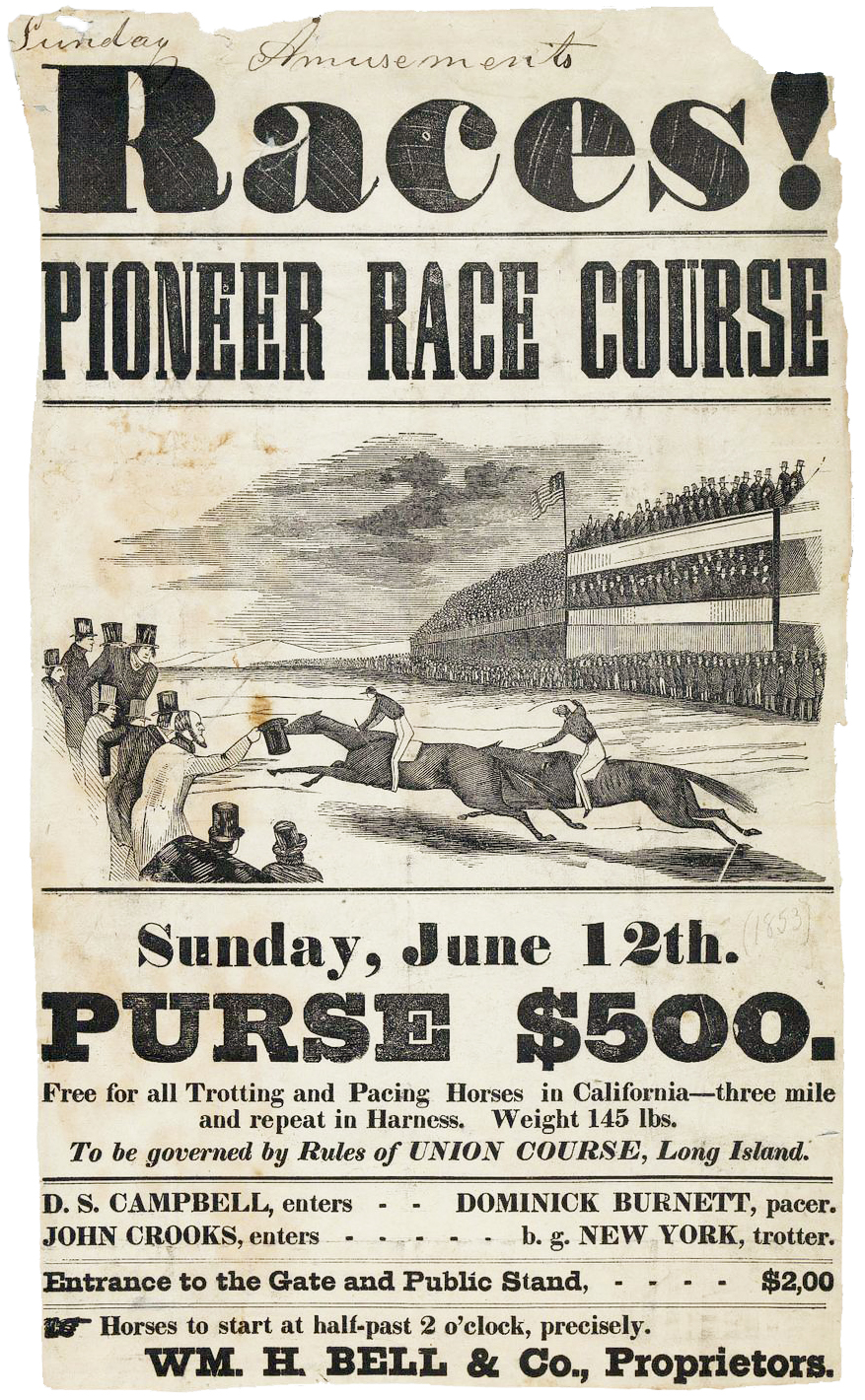
Races! Pioneer Race Course advertisement dated June 12, 1853

Pioneer Race Course, also known as the Pioneer Race Track, was a horse race track opened in March 1851, in the southern Mission District of San Francisco, California.

Pioneer was the first race course in San Francisco. At the time that it was built, no streets existed in the neighborhood. After construction, it appears to have been bounded by 24th St. (formerly Park St.), 26th St. (formerly Navy St.), Capp St., and Florida St.

It was funded and built by local businessmen George Treat and his brother John Treat. The racetrack was physically built by Alfred Green.

The race course was sold to the San Francisco Homestead Association in 1862 (or 1863) for $500 per acre, but would be worth $20,000 per acre within a decade. Lots within the property were auctioned in 1864. Early houses built within the property are now part of the Shotwell Street historic district, and another house within the property may be the oldest remaining home building in San Francisco.

== Historical events ==
On May 21, 1854, the Pioneer Race Course was the site of a duel between lawyer George T. Hunt and his friend Numa Hubert, an ex-member of the California state assembly. On the third round, Hunt was shot in the abdomen and died.

In October 1854, the race course was the site of the stock show at the first California State Fair.

From 1862 until 1863 (some sources report 1865), the site of the course served a civil war encampment called Camp Alert for the 2nd California Cavalry, before they moved to Salt Lake City, Utah.

The course was the site of a celebration of the completion of the San Francisco-San Jose Railway in October 1863, and for a time also served as the railway's San Francisco station. The positioning of the course, as well as the later built nearby Union Race Course, appear to have affected the placement of the railway's extension into the city, and therefore still affects local property lines.

== Maps ==
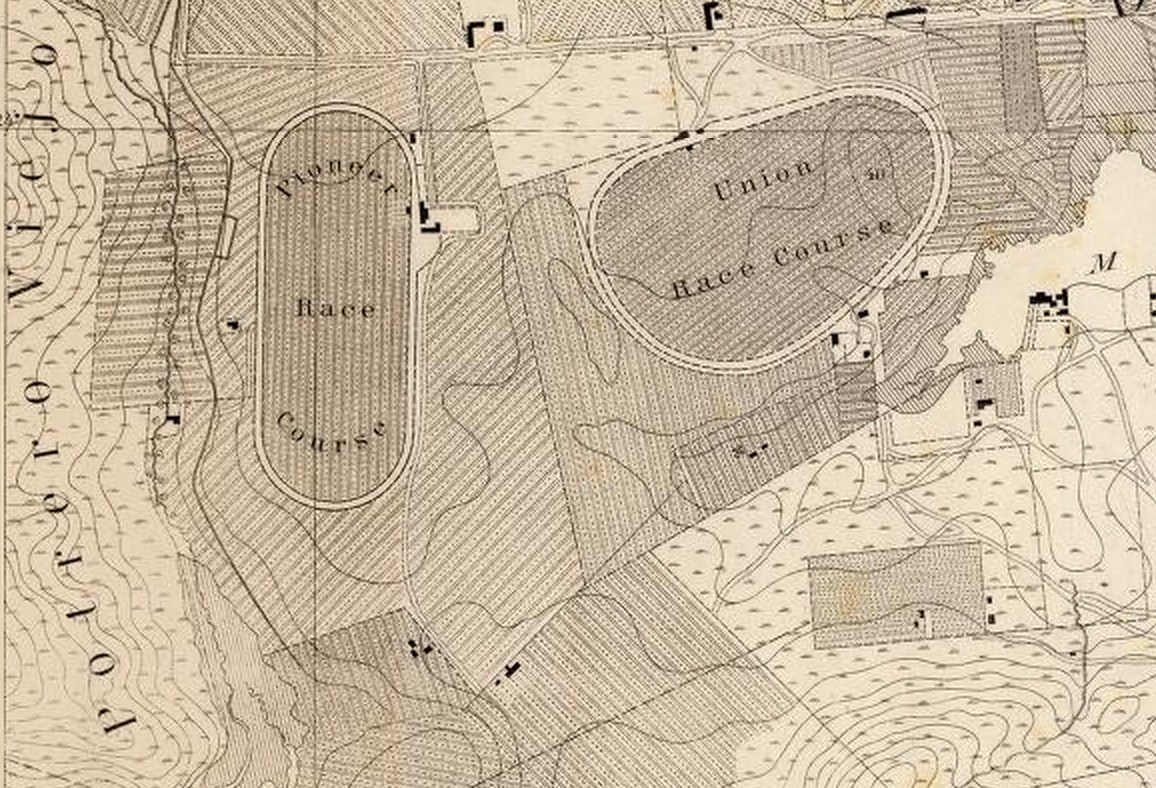
1857 Map showing Pioneer Race Course and nearby Union Race Course (West at top of map)

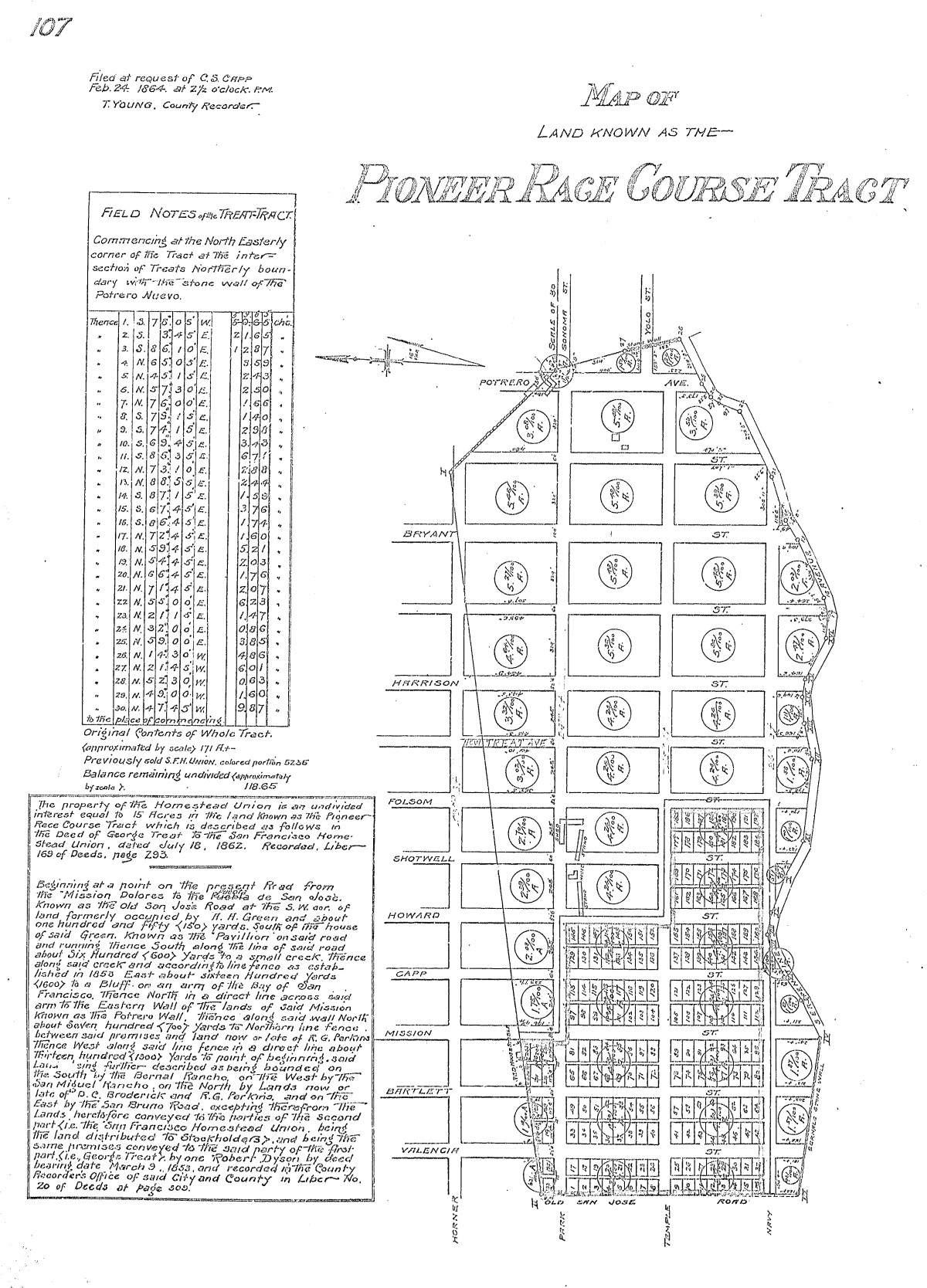
1864 San Francisco surveyor showing Pioneer Race Course Tract (housing tract made from the Course's land) (East at top of map)

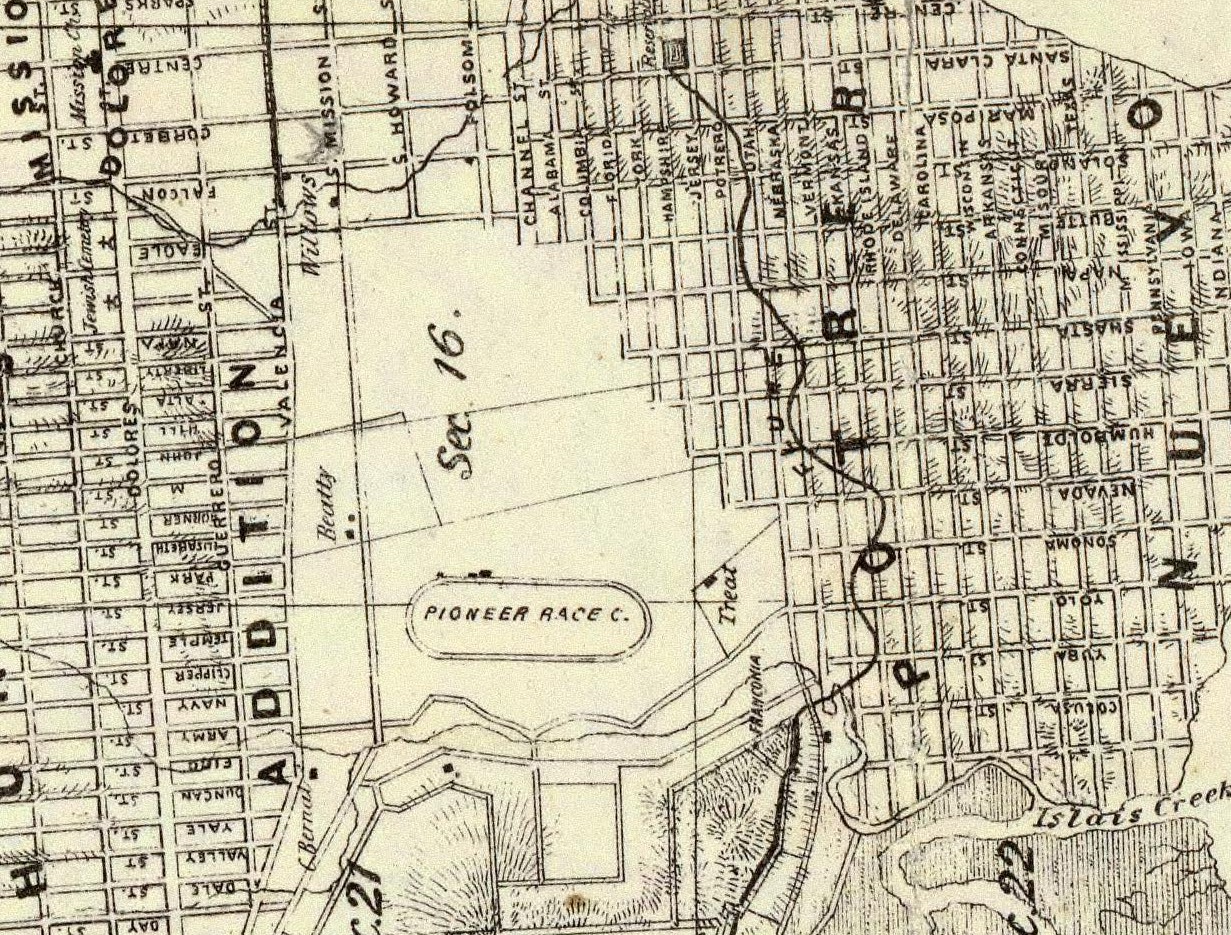
1861 Map of San Francisco, showing Pioneer Race Course (North at top of map)
