= 2nd California Cavalry Regiment =

2nd Regiment California Volunteer Cavalry
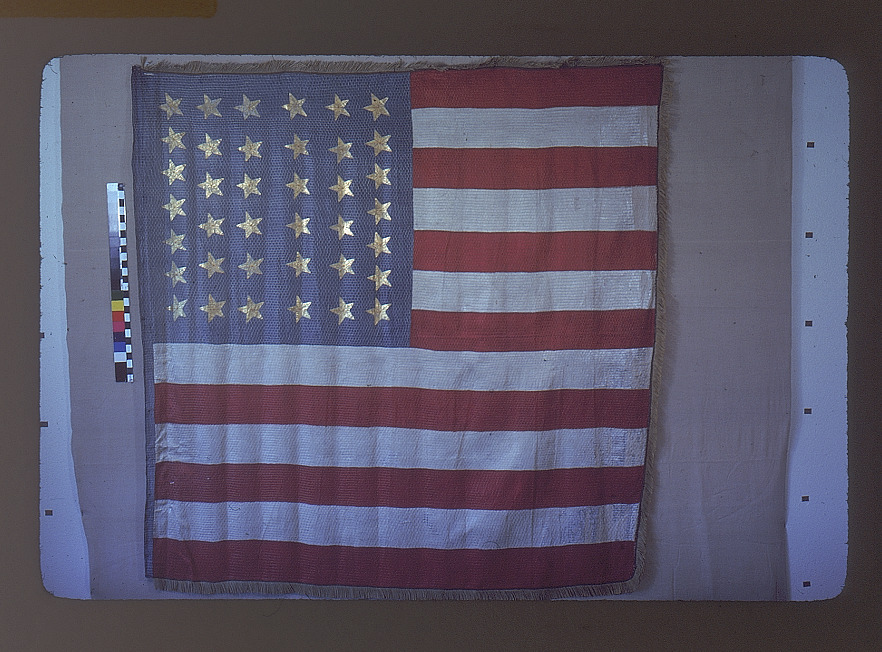
- National color of the regiment
- Active: September 1861 to October 21, 1866
- Country: United States
- Allegiance: Union
- Branch: Cavalry
- Engagements: Battle of Apache Pass; Bear River Massacre; Keyesville Massacre (Co. D & E); Battle of Pecos River

The 2nd Regiment California Volunteer Cavalry was a cavalry regiment in the Union Army during the American Civil War. It spent its entire term of service in the western United States, with most of its companies dispersed to various posts.

== History ==
The 2nd Regiment California Volunteer Cavalry was raised in response to President Lincoln's second call for troops in August 1861. By October 30, 1861, the regiment was organized and mustered into the service. The companies were assembled at Camp Alert in San Francisco. After completing the organization of the regiment, and a short period for drill and discipline, the regiment was sent, by companies, to various posts within the Department of the Pacific. The regiment was mustered out in March, 1866, although some companies remained in service beyond that date.

== Regimental Commanders ==
- Colonel Andrew J. Smith October 2, 1861 - resigned November 15, 1861
- Colonel Columbus Sims November 13, 1861 - January 31, 1863
- Colonel George S. Evans February 1, 1863 - resigned May 31, 1863
- Colonel Edward McGarry November 29, 1864 - March 31, 1866.

== Flags ==
The 2nd California Cavalry has a number of company guidons preserved in the state capitol. The Regimental colors were lost; the only flags that survived were one national flag and three company flags. Most of these flag were made by locals in towns and nearby areas for "their" companies. In 1862 Quartermaster R. L. Ogden ordered four guidons from D. Norcross for Companies B, D, G, and J. A few months later Lieutenant Livergood of Company I was presented with a national flag made by the women of Visalia.

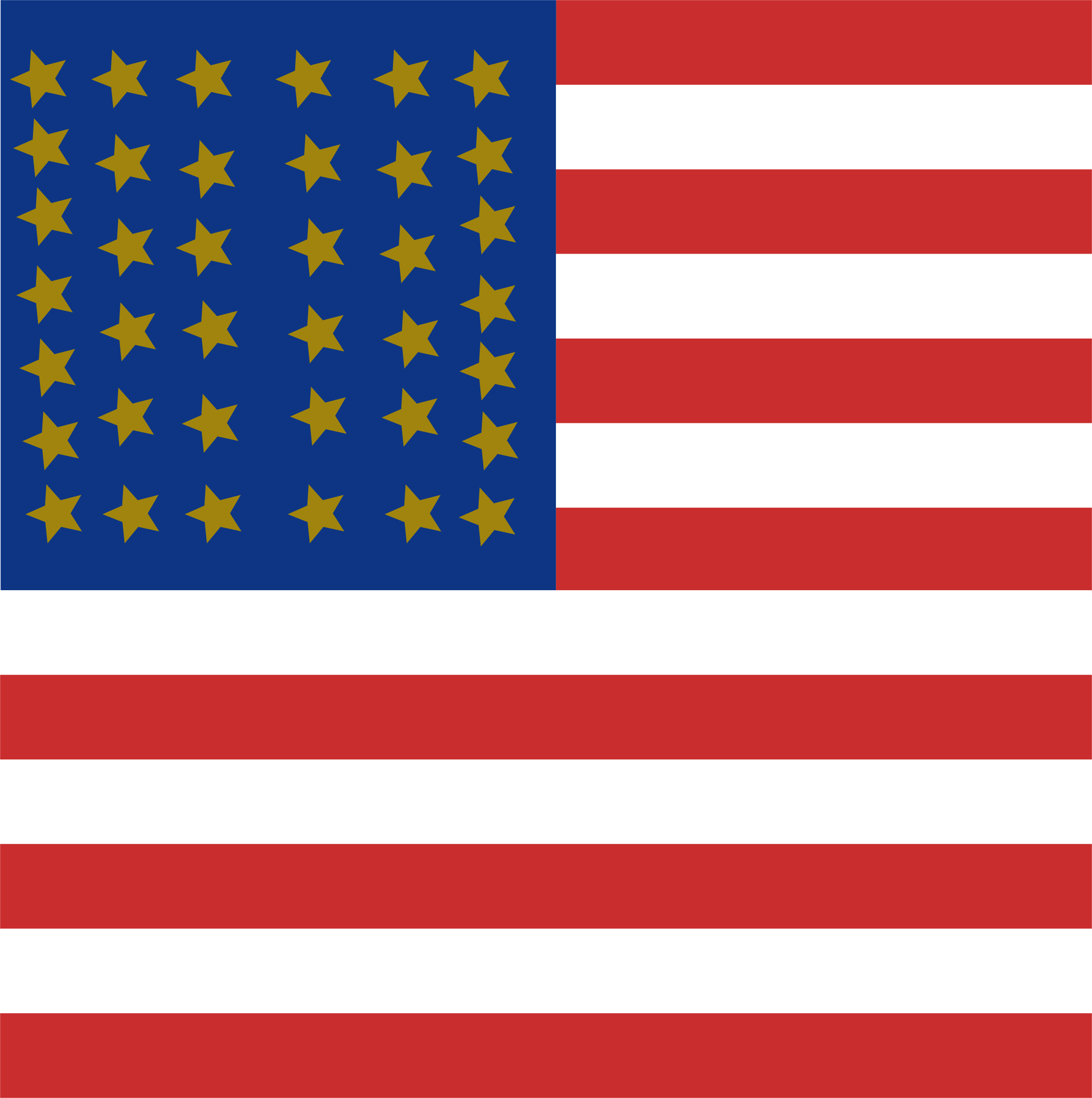
National flag of the 2nd California Cavalry regiment (user-created image)

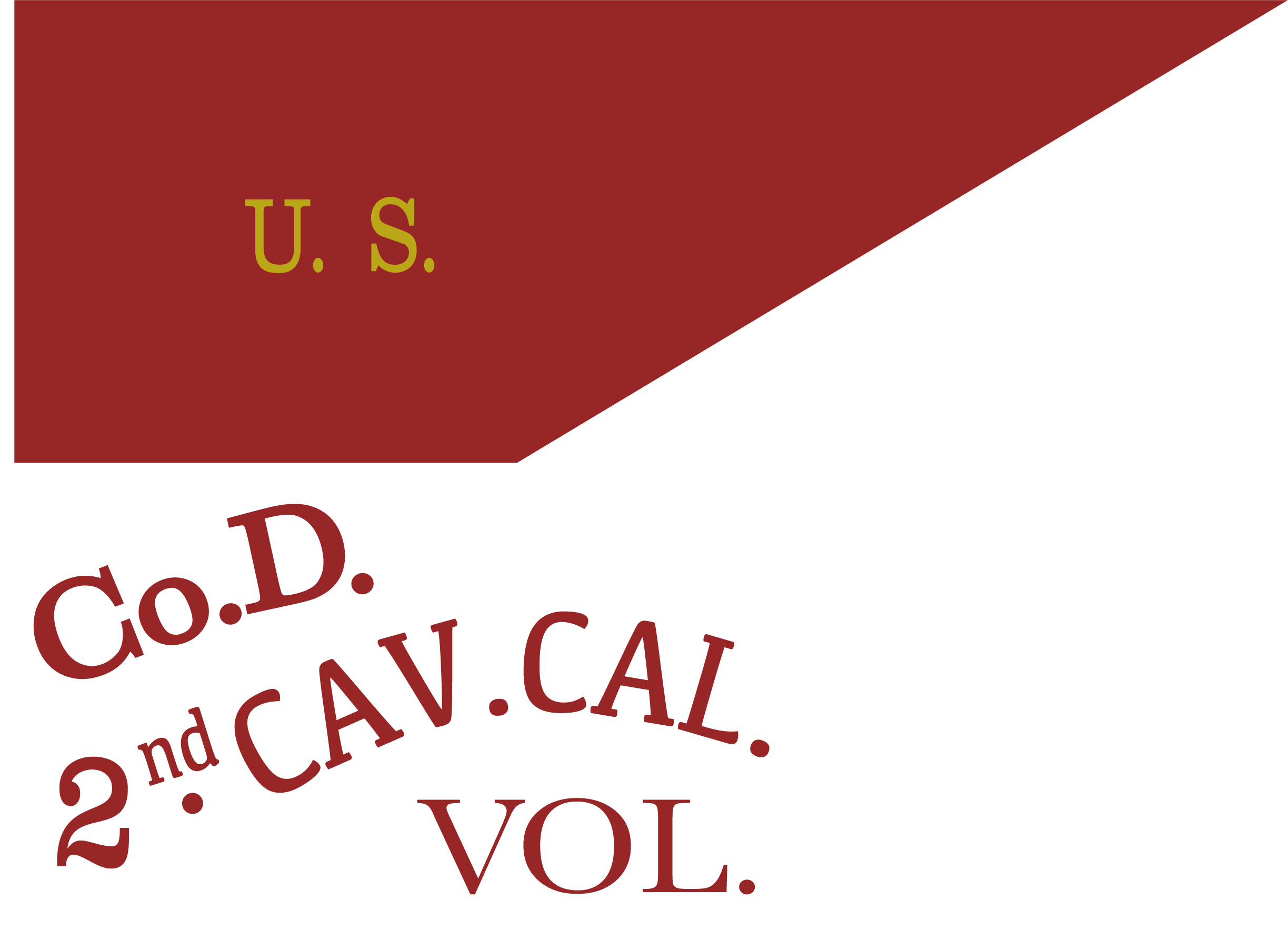
Company D Guidon, (user-created image)

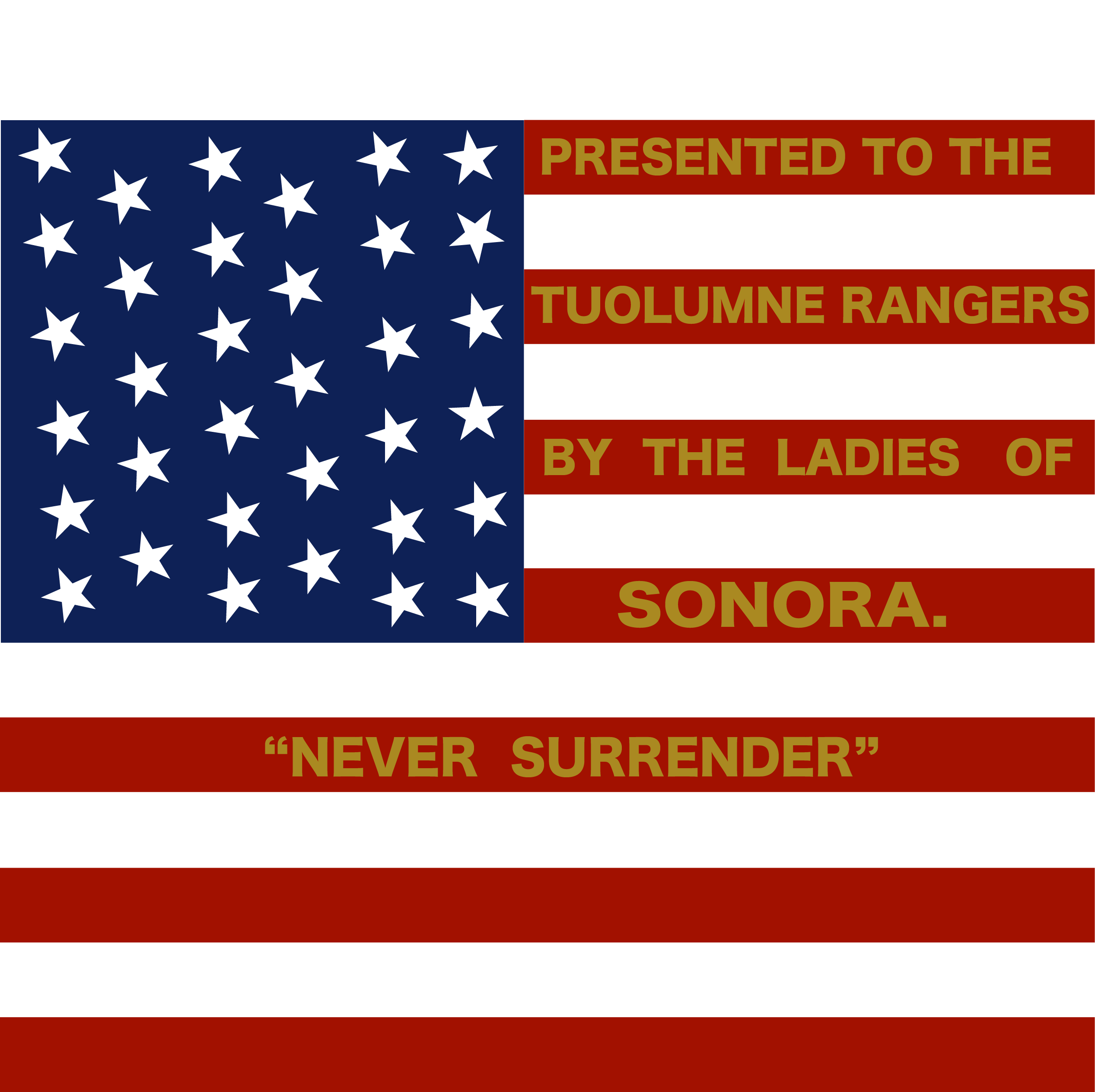
National Color, Tuolumne Rangers, Company E made by the women of Sonora (user-created image)

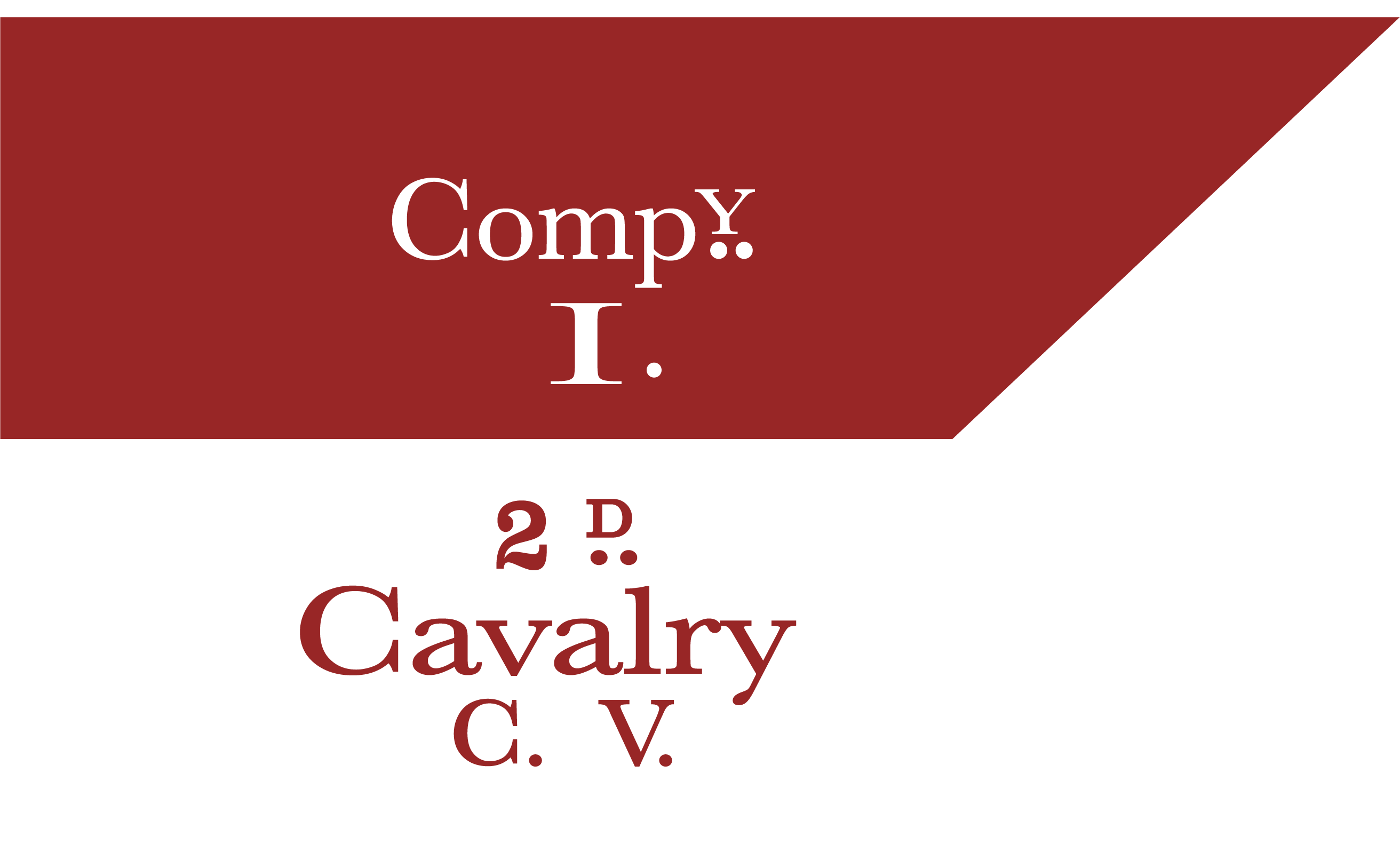
Company I Guidon, (user-created image)

== Company assignments ==
- Headquarters: After completing the organization of the regiment, the Regimental headquarters was sent to Utah Territory, remaining there until October, 1864, when it moved to Camp Union, near Sacramento, and remained there until the final muster out of the regiment as an organization, in March, 1866.
- Company A: Company A went first to Fort Churchill, Nevada, then to Utah Territory, where it remained until December, 1864, when it moved to Camp Union near Sacramento. About that time the terms of service of most of its members expired. Company A was reorganized by reenlistment of many of its old members and the enlistment of recruits to fill up the company to the required number. In September, 1865, it marched to Fort Miller, in Fresno County, and in November 1865, it moved to Camp Babbitt, near Visalia, where it remained until ordered to Camp Union, near Sacramento, for muster out, in April, 1866.
- Company B: Company B was ordered to Southern California in February 1862, and became part of Carleton's California Column, with 15 soldiers of the Company being selected as personal bodyguards to the general. While camped near Apache Pass on June 25, three members of the company were killed by 60 Apaches and their bodies were mutilated and scalped. In the spring of 1864 it returned to California, and was mustered out in San Francisco on October 10, 1864. The company commander during this period of service was Captain John C. Cremony. After the muster out of the original Company B, a new Company B was organized, and George D. Conrad became captain of the company. The new company remained at Camp Union. While in Sacramento Private David Cusick robbed Michael Sullivan at the Western Hotel. In June of 1865 the company moved to the mining town of Dun Glen, Nevada, where it served until mustered out in the spring of 1866.
- Company C: Served at Fort Crook nearly the whole time it was in service. When the enlistments of its original members expired in the fall of 1864, they were mustered out at Fort Crook. The company was reformed through enlistment of recruits in San Francisco. It was mustered out in Sacramento in May, 1866.
- Company D: After leaving Camp Alert, Company D went to Southern California in early 1862. While there private John Wood attempted to shoot his commanding officer and was arrested and sent to Alcatraz Island for the rest of the war. In June 1862, it was sent to join Col. Evans' campaign against the Paiutes in the Owens Valley and returned to Camp Babbitt in the fall. On the resumption of hostilities in the Owens Valley they returned to the area in April 1863 via Keyesville, California, perpetrating the Keyesville massacre then moved on to Camp Independence in the Owens River Valley and participated in the final campaign of the Owens Valley Indian War. They then escortied almost 1000 Paiutes to Fort Tejon in July 1863. They remained there until August, 1863, then moved to Fort Tejon until March, 1864, when it moved to Camp Union and the original members were mustered out. During the months of September and October, 1864, the company was reorganized by Captain W. L. Knight, and after serving a short time at Camp Union and Camp Jackson in Amador County, it went to Colusa. From there it moved to Red Bluff, and finally, in July, 1865, to Smoke Creek, Nevada (north of Pyramid Lake), where it remained until mustered out at Camp Union on May 29, 1866.
- Company E: Originally organized as the "Tuolumne Rangers," after leaving Camp Alert Company E went to Fort Humboldt. In June Capt. Akey was shot dead by a private, who was instantly killed by another who witnessed the whole affair. They would leave in the spring of 1862. In August of 1862 they were stationed at Red Bluff and on 28th a notable secessionist living in the town named Mark started insulting and threatening one of the soldiers. Mark then took out a slingshot and flung a rock at the soldier. The trooper responded by pulling out his pistol and aiming it at the secessionist, but at the last minute a local knocked his arm away and he ended up shooting bystander named Fallan in the breast. Fallan was expected to survive. October they were about to move to Benicia when one soldier got drunk and tried to desert. A small detachment was sent after him. The deserter was captured, but later tried to desert two more times. No record of the stations of this company can be found from November, 1862 until April, 1863, at which time it was at Camp Babbitt and then moved to Camp Independence in the Owens River Valley. During July, 1863, it went to Fort Tejon, and in August, 1863, to Camp Babbitt, near Visalia. The original members were mustered out in San Francisco, October 6, 1864. In February of 1865, a detachment led by Sergeant Rowley was sent out on a pursuit of what they believed to be the Mason-Henry Gang. They led them across Southern California and into Sonora, Mexico. The whole thing was retold in the Visalia Delta.
  Mason and Henry - The squad of soldiers sent out from Camp Babbitt by Captain Noble under the command of Sergeant Rowley, in pursuit of the above Constitutional Democratic murders of Union men, have returned to camp. They report a very hard skirmish, traveling over 900 miles through a most desolate country; upon several occasions going out two or three days without food for themselves, or forage for their horses. They were several times on their trail, after they left Fort Tejón, and finally tracked them down into Sonora, when they were compelled to give up the chase on account of their horses giving out and their inability to get fresh ones. The fugitives were well supplied with gold, having $3,000 or more in their possession. It is believed by many that they have gone to recruit a guerrilla band, and will return to prey on Union men in the lower part of the State. They could have obtained plenty of recruits nigher home. Doubtless, Visalia would have furnished several birds of prey and a surgeon or two, to bind up their broken bones, and very likely a Chaplain to minister to their bruised souls, and a number of spies, sneaks, and informers. As to good fighting men, they would be scarcer hereabouts. The party were out twenty-five days.

After leaving Camp Babbitt the company was stationed again at Camp Independence, until it was ordered to San Francisco to be mustered out on June 2, 1866

- Company F: This company was organized in Sacramento and was first called the "Sacramento Rangers." After leaving Camp Alert it was stationed at various places. On July 23, 1862 over 300 prisoners broke out of San Quentin and took Lieut. Gov. Chellis as a hostage. A detachment of 48 men were sent out and recaptured them. The company went to Camp Union. but on July 31, 1863, moved to Camp Bidwell until April 1864 when it returned to Camp Union. About one third of the company was kept in San Francisco as a provost guard most of the time the company was in the service. Fourteen of its enlisted men were commissioned as officers in other companies or regiments of California Volunteers. The original company was mustered out at San Francisco, September 24, 1864. The company was reformed with new recruits and stationed at Camp Union but moved between Bear Valley, Mariposa County, California, Ione Valley, Colusa, Fort Crook, Smoke Creek, Nevada, Fort Bidwell and Goose Lake, California. It was finally mustered out at Sacramento, June 27, 1866.
- Company G: Company G was organized at Camp Alert and sent to Camp Drum, where it remained about a month before moving to Camp Latham, near Los Angeles. During August, 1863, the company moved to Camp Leonard, California, where it remained for two months. It then went to Fort Tejon for three months; then to Camp Babbitt, near Visalia, where it remained from January, 1864, to August, 1864 when it marched to San Francisco to be mustered out during the months of September and October. The company was reorganized and was stationed at Camp Union from October, 1864, to March, 1865. It was in Camp near Hornitos, Mariposa County, for one month; then at Camp Union until February 1, 1866, when it was finally mustered out.
- Company H: Company H, after organization at Camp Alert, was sent to Fort Churchill, Nevada, where it was stationed during the months of January and February, 1862. There are no records of the stations of this company from February 28, 1862, until April 30, 1864, when it was stationed at Camp Relief, Utah Territory, and from May to August, 1864, at Camp Conness, Idaho Territory, and at Camp Douglas, Utah Territory, during September, 1864. The terms of service of most of the original members expired during the months of September and October, and they were mustered out at Camp Douglas. The remaining men moved to Camp Union, Sacramento, where the company was recruited up to strength and remained on duty there from December, 1864 to March, 1865. It was on provost guard duty in Sacramento from April to August, when it was ordered to Drum Barracks, Los Angeles County, arriving there about October 1, 1865, where it remained until its final muster out on April 20, 1866. A detachment, stationed in San Francisco, was mustered out at the Presidio, April 26, 1866.
- Company I: Company I was organized at Camp Alert. It was sent first to Camp Drum, where it was stationed during January, 1862, and at Camp Latham, near Los Angeles, in February, 1862. From February, 1862 to April, 1863, there is no record. On April 30, 1863, the company was at Camp Babbitt, near Visalia, where it remained until January, 1864. It then marched to Benicia Barracks, where it was stationed from March to May. It moved in June, 1864, to Camp Bidwell, near Chico, California, where it remained. The terms of most of the original members expired in September, 1864 and they were discharged in San Francisco from October 1 to October 7, 1864. Recruited up to strength at Camp Bidwell, the company remained there until May 1865. In April of 1865, they were stationed at Chico when Lieut. Livergood was shot and killed by Corporal Frank Hudson who later ran. He was hunted down by the company with Private Allen a personal friend of Livergood being the one to captured him. Frank Hudson was later sentenced to be hanged in June by the military authorities. The company left on May 23, 1865 for Smoke Creek, Nevada. It then moved to Fort Churchill and later moved up the Humboldt River in search of Indians, later moving to Paradise Valley, Nevada, from June, 23 until the July, 3, 1865. The company later crossed the mountains and headed back to the Humboldt River. On July 8, 1865 it headed back down the river en route to Gravelly Ford. During this move they found an village with around 300 to 400 Indians living in it. When the Indians saw the troops approaching they soon abandoned camp. The scouts were sent out to find the villagers and quickly made contacted with a small group of them. The group was informed the Americans wanted to negotiate a treaty, but the Indians didn't want to return fearing they would be killed. The scouts returned to the company and reported to Colonel McGarry, who told them to informed the Indians that if they didn't come back to camp he would send a detachment of soldiers to get them. The scouts later returned with a group of 25 Indians who were taken as prisoners, but some ran and were successful in getting away from the men. A couple days later the men found out some of Indians in the group took part of the killing of 2 soldiers from Company D of the 1st Nevada Cavalry Battalion. Those Indians were detained and the others were released, but another 2 were rearrested for reportedly making threats. They were all sent to Fort Churchill but were all shot and killed while en route. According to the soldiers they tired to escape. The company again headed to Paradise Valley without any incidents. When they got to the valley there were reports of Indians near the Queens River so the men marched out to the area. A small detachment was left behind to guard the Quartermaster's tent. There were no incidents until July 26, 1865 when the men found a group of 40 Indians carrying a white flag. According to one account when the Indians got within shouting distance the men requested Indians cross the creek, which they refused. Then one of the Indians started to load his rifle. The flag was soon dropped and a 3 hour battle started. The company lost 1 soldier killed and 2 wounded while according to the soldiers they killed 21 Indians during the fighting.
- Company K: Company K was at Camp Alert until February 28, 1862. It was stationed at Fort Ruby, Nevada, March 31, 1863, and it was then stationed at Deep Creek, Utah, Government Springs, Utah, Cedar Swamp, Utah, Fort Ruby again, Farmington, Utah, and at Camp Douglas, Utah, remaining about a month at each place. It was stationed at Camp Douglas from November, 1863, until April, 1864. It then moved to various places: Camp Relief, Utah, Canon Creek, Idaho, Camp Conness, Idaho, Farmington, Utah, and Camp Douglas again, arriving at the latter place about the last of September, 1864, where nearly all of the original members were mustered out. The company was recruited up to strength and served at Camp Union, to June 30, 1865, then at Chico, California, July, 1865, Smoke Creek, Nevada, from August to October, 1865. Then at Fort Churchill until May 1, 1866, when it was marched to Camp Union, and finally mustered out May 18, 1866.
- Company L: Company L was at Camp Alert until March, 1862. During April 1863 it was in camp at Bishop Creek, Owens River Valley; during May, 1863, at Camp Independence; June, at Fort Churchill, July, at Fort Ruby, both in Nevada; August, en route to Salt Lake, and from that month to March, 1864, at Camp Douglas, near Salt Lake City. During the next four months it was at various places in succession, as follows: Rush Valley, March, 1864; Camp Relief, April; Camp Conness, May; Bingham Creek, June; and back to Camp Douglas for the next two months; The terms of service of the original members expired in September and October, 1864, and they were mustered out at Camp Douglas. In October Private George B, Tierney committed suicide by injecting 4 grains of morphine. The company was reorganized and recruited up to strength at Camp Douglas, then sent to Fort Bridger, Wyoming Territory, for five months. Then they went to Fort Laramie, for a few months; then in Rush Valley, Utah, to May, 1866, and finally back to Camp Douglas for final muster out on July 12, 1866.
- Company M: Company M was at Camp Alert until the spring of 1862. In March, Private Perry Tracy was arrested for deserting and sent to Fort Churchill. He later escaped and made his way to the Sierra Valley, where he sold his horse to a man named Dwinelle; he then stole the horse and rode off. Dwinelle quickly followed the private and shot him. From May 1, 1863, to May, 1864, it was stationed at Fort Bridger, Wyoming Territory. From May until August, 1864, it was surveying and building a wagon road from Salt Lake to the head of navigation on the Colorado River in Arizona Territory near Fort Mojave. From August to November, it was at Camp Douglas. The terms of service of the original members expired in September and October, 1864, and the company was mustered out at Camp Douglas, October 4, 1864. The company was rebuilt by recruiting new members, and from November, 1864, to May, 1865, it was at Fort Bridger, Wyoming Territory. From May to June, 1865, at Fort Laramie; July to November, 1864 at various places in Dakota, Wyoming, and Utah Territories. From November, 1865, to May, 1866, they were at Government Reservation, Rush Valley, Utah. From May to June, 1866, at Camp Douglas, where the company was finally mustered out on July 12, 1866.

== See also ==
- List of California Civil War Union units

== Sources ==
- The California State Military Museum; 2nd Regiment of Cavalry, California Volunteers
- Records of California men in the war of the rebellion 1861 to 1867 By California. Adjutant General's Office, SACRAMENTO: State Office, J. D. Young, Supt. State Printing. 1890. pp.168-303
- All Known Battles & Skirmishes During the American Civil War - Nevada Territory & State
