= Camp Alert (California) =

Coordinates: 37°45′5″N 122°24′58″W

Camp Alert was an American Civil War Union Army, training camp located at the Pioneer Race Course, near San Francisco, north of Bernal Heights. Today the site location is within the city, between 24th and 25th Streets (north and south) and Folsom and Mission Streets (east and west).

Camp Alert was first used in 1862, as the place where the 2nd Regiment California Volunteer Cavalry was headquartered, organized and trained before moving to their headquarters to Utah Territory. Although the last unit of the 2nd California Volunteer Cavalry left April 30, 1863, it remained as a post until 1865.
