= Edward McGarry (soldier) =

American politician

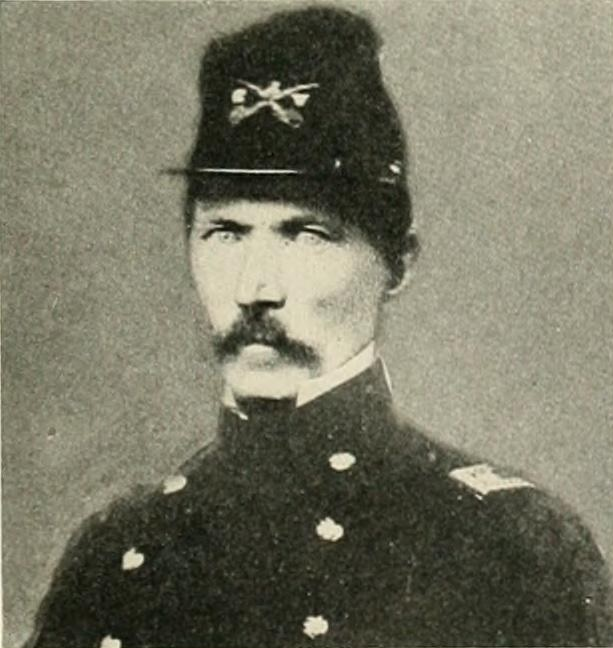
- Edward McGarry during the American Civil War
- Born: c. 1820; Rochester, New York, U.S.
- Died: December 31, 1867 (aged 47); San Francisco, California, U.S.
- Military career
- Branch: United States Army: Union Army
- Rank: Colonel; Bvt. Brigadier General
- Units: 10th U.S. Infantry Regiment; 32nd U.S. Infantry Regiment
- Commands: 2nd California Cavalry Regiment
- Conflicts: Mexican-American War; American Indian Wars; American Civil War
- Other work: Politician

Edward McGarry (c. 1820 – December 31, 1867) was an officer in the Mexican American War, a Californian politician, and an officer of California Volunteers in the American Civil War. He led cavalry at the Bear River Massacre, was later colonel of the 2nd California Cavalry Regiment, and later commander of the District of California. He received a brevet promotion to brigadier general of volunteers. After the Civil War he rejoined the Regular Army as a lieutenant colonel.

Edward McGarry was a native of New York, who served as a second lieutenant in the Mexican–American War with the 10th U.S. Infantry Regiment. He saw no action except as part of the garrison army before the peace took effect. McGarry left the Army and traveled to California after the end of the war and became involved in California politics serving as an assemblyman from Napa County's 20th District from 1853 to 1854. Subsequently, from 1854 to 1855, he was a state senator from Napa, Solano and Yolo Counties. When the American Civil War broke out, he assisted in raising the 2nd California Cavalry Regiment, serving first as a major under Col. Columbus Sims. After marching to Fort Ruby, in Nevada Territory, Sims was relieved of his command by the Department of the Pacific on August 19, 1862. He was replaced in command of the 2nd California Cavalry detachment by McGarry by Col. Patrick Edward Connor. Under Connor's command the 2nd Cavalry served in Nevada and Utah during the rest of the Civil War, fighting various native tribes.

In the early 1860s, the Bannock and Shoshone Indians in southern Idaho were becoming increasingly aggressive toward passing wagon trains. Travelers reported instances of thievery and attacks. McGarry was sent to investigate, and executed some Shoshone for their actions. McGarry's executions angered the Shoshone even more, prompting them to threaten to kill any white person they found above the Bear River. American forces, led by Colonel Patrick Edward Connor, were sent to confront the Shoshone in what became known as the Bear River Massacre, which left at least 250 Shoshone civilians dead.

In his official report on the engagement, Connor described ordering McGarry, then a major, to advance the cavalry ahead of the main body and surround the Shoshone encampment on the morning of January 29, 1863. By Connor's account, McGarry had already dismounted his troopers and engaged the Shoshone, who had come out to meet the soldiers "on foot and horseback" and, in Connor's words, "with fiendish malignity waved the scalps of white women and challenged the troops to battle." As the fighting continued, McGarry led a flanking party that turned the Shoshone position, a maneuver Connor credited with breaking their resistance. In his report, Connor singled out McGarry by name for "the highest praise for their skill, gallantry, and bravery throughout the engagement."

On February 26, 1864, McGarry was promoted to lieutenant colonel and took command of Camp Union, from Lt. Colonel O. M. Brown, who went to Los Angeles. He was afterwards appointed colonel and was given command of the 2nd California Cavalry from November 29, 1864, to March 31, 1866. In this capacity Col. McGarry presided over the military commission that tried the Salvador Pirates and found them guilty in May 1865.

As a popular officer and famed for his role in the Cache Valley victory, McGarry was appointed one of the judges that declared the first of three famous California races between the thoroughbreds Norfolk and Lodi a dead heat. In June 1865 he was ordered to succeed Brigadier General George Wright, in command of the District of California.

After the war ended McGarry rejoined the Regular Army and was appointed lieutenant colonel of the 32nd U.S. Infantry Regiment, one of its newly organized regiments. In 1867, he was commanding a garrison at Tubac, Arizona, when he showed up for a military parade in the plaza in a state of intoxication. Consequently, McGarry was reassigned to San Francisco, California, but no disciplinary action was taken against him. However, he had been drinking very heavily. On the night of his death, he manifested symptoms of mania a potu, and the staff in the Occidental Hotel confined him to his room. About 11 o'clock he told the servant to clear out, locked the door and was found early the next morning, December 31, 1867, lying on the floor of his room in his own blood, his throat cut and an open pen knife by his side. No cause was found for his action, nothing was left in writing. It was supposed it was done in a temporary fit of insanity.

McGarry was 45 years of age when he died. His funeral was held at the Unitarian Church. General H. W. Halleck, commander of the Military Division of the Pacific and a large number of other officers of the Regular Army, ex-governor Low and several judges of the state courts attended. A military escort and many friends accompanied his body to the Cemetery.

Camp McGarry, a U.S. military camp in northern Nevada, was named for him.

== See also ==
- List of American Civil War brevet generals (Union)
