= Sutterville, California =

Sutterville
- Former settlement
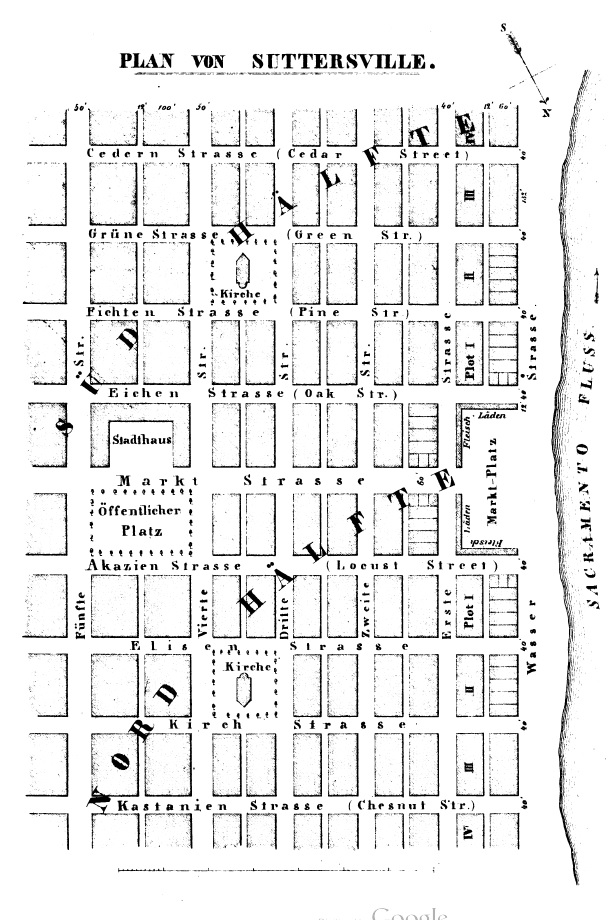
- Map of Sutterville

- Location in California
- Coordinates: 38°32′45″N 121°30′30″W
- Country: United States
- State: California
- County: Sacramento

California Historical Landmark
- Reference no.: 593

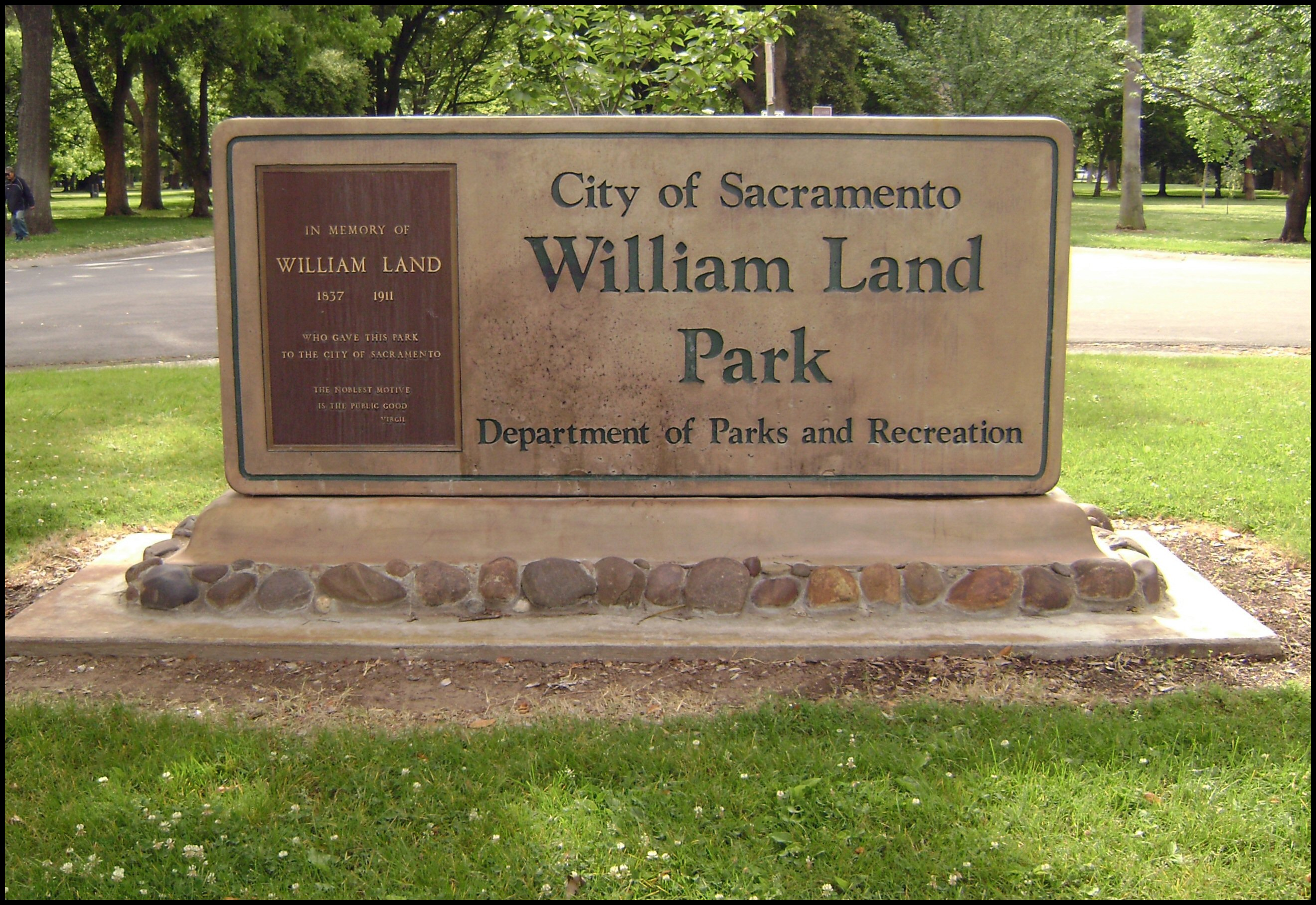
William Land Park Sacramento on site of former Sutterville

Sutterville (also, Sutter, Sutter City, and Suttersville) is a former settlement in Sacramento County, California, United States. It was located on the Southern Pacific Railroad, 2.25 miles (3.6 km) south-southwest of Sacramento,

John A. Sutter had Lansford W. Hastings and John Bidwell lay out the town in 1844, south of his embarcadero on a low bluff overlooking the Sacramento River. In exchange, Hastings and Bidwell both received a share of the lots. It was in this settlement that George Zins built one of the first brick structures in California, in 1847. When the town of Sacramento developed at his embarcadero, Sutterville fell into decline. The Sutterville post office operated from 1855 to 1860. Sutterville was the site of Camp Union, a major California Volunteer training camp during the American Civil War.

Sutterville is also California Historical Landmark #593.

William Land was the mayor of Sacramento during 1898 and 1899. He was the wealthiest man in Sacramento. After his death in 1911, his will and testament bequeathed $450,000 to Sutterville. Of this amount, $250,000 was to be used for a Sacramento public park. Of the $250,000 the city received, the city purchased 238 acres of land at Sutterville for a park in 1918, in what was called Sutterville. The 238 acres of land is now the William Land Regional Park, Land Park Playground, and William Land Golf Course. The William Land Park is bordered by Sutterville Road to the south, Freeport Boulevard to the east, 13th Avenue to the north, and Land Park Drive to the west. The Sacramento Zoo is adjacent to the park.
