= Suttersville, California =

Suttersville, California may refer to:

- Sutter Creek, California
- Sutterville, California
