= Camp Union (California) =

Historical Landmark in Sacramento, United States

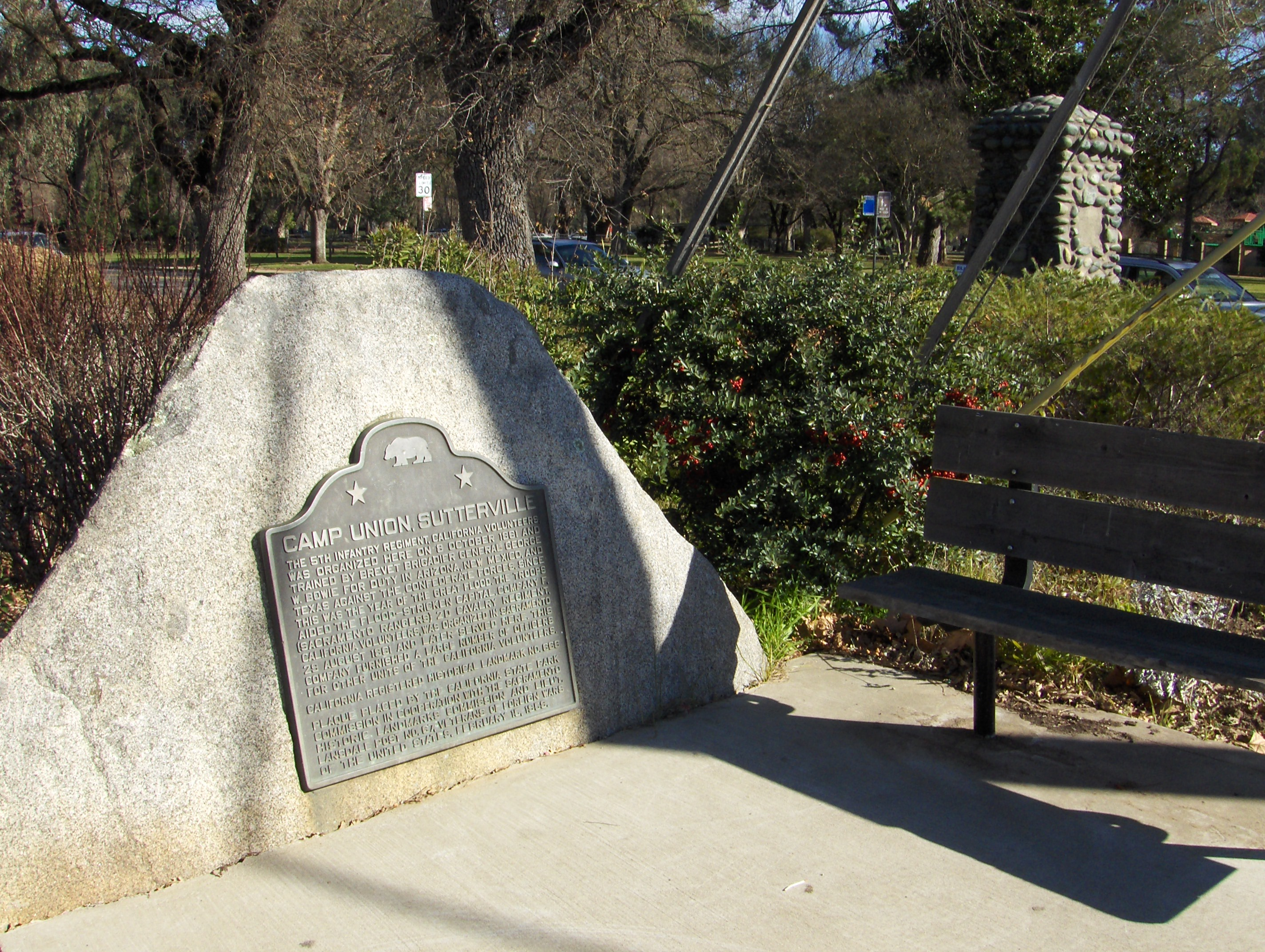
- Camp Union historical marker 666

- Location within California Location within the United States
- 38.5378°N 121.5040°W
- Location: Northeast corner of Sutterville Road and Land Park Drive; Sacramento, California

History
- Built: 1861

California Historical Landmark
- Reference no.: 666

Camp Union was a temporary military encampment and training facility for the Union Army during the American Civil War. Established in 1861, the camp was situated at the northeast corner of Sutterville Road and Land Park Drive near Sutterville, just south of Sacramento, California. The camp operated as a major staging area for federal forces in the West until it was abandoned in 1866.

== History ==
Camp Union was established in 1861 to organize and train volunteer regiments tasked with Pacific Coast defense and internal security. It was a vital facility for California's wartime mobilization, ultimately serving as the training ground for approximately a third of the 15,000 California volunteers who served during the conflict.

The camp served as a crucial "officer pipeline" for the Union forces. Company F of the 2nd Regiment California Volunteer Cavalry, known as the Sacramento Rangers, was organized at the camp on August 29, 1861. This single company functioned essentially as an officer training school, providing a disproportionately large number of officers who went on to lead other California Volunteer units throughout the war.

The 5th Regiment California Volunteer Infantry was formally organized and mustered at the camp on October 8, 1861. Trained by Brevet Brigadier General George W. Bowie, the 5th Regiment was highly strategic. These troops were deployed across Arizona, New Mexico, and Texas to push back Confederate incursions and suppress local secessionist uprisings, ensuring the Pacific Coast and Southwest remained under Union control.

During the winter of 1861–1862, the region was devastated by the Great Flood of 1862. The camp itself was completely inundated and forced to evacuate. However, the soldiers of the 5th Infantry Regiment actively waded into the disaster, providing crucial relief and rescue operations for the flooded citizens of the California capital.

After the Confederate surrender at Appomattox in April 1865, the camp transformed into one of the largest mustering-out centers in the West. Between 1864 and 1866, countless battle-weary units rotated back through Camp Union to be formally discharged and transitioned back to civilian life.
