= Vic's Ice Cream =

Restaurant in Sacramento, California

Vic's Ice Cream (est. 1947) is a restaurant located in the Land Park neighborhood of Sacramento, California. Best known for its ice cream, Vic's also serves sandwiches and other menu items.

== Atmosphere ==
Vic's has maintained much the same atmosphere that it had when the store opened in 1947. The black and white checkered floor tiles, blue jeans and tucked-in shirts worn by employees, and menu items all date back to the store's inception during the Truman administration.

== Ice cream ==
Vic's carries 29 standard flavors of ice cream, and during the year several seasonal flavors become available.

Each year Vic's is contracted to produce three gallons of garlic ice cream for the Gilroy Garlic Festival in Gilroy, California. Except for the festival, this flavor is otherwise unavailable.

== Notable patrons ==
Vic's is one of many local dining venues popular with Sacramento's politicians. Vic's is a favorite dining location of lifelong Land Park resident and California gubernatorial candidate Phil Angelides. Vic's was also a favored dining location of the late United States Representative Robert Matsui and his wife, current United States Representative Doris Matsui. Congressman John E. Moss Jr., who served Sacramento's 3rd District, was also a longtime patron of Vic's.

The land wherein the building sits was sold to Vic Zito and Ash Rutledge by Charlotte F. Moss, the congressman's sister-in-law Michele Lyon-Brown (née Moss) the congressman's niece and Charlotte's daughter.

== Awards ==
In the Sacramento Magazine's 2005 Subscriber's Choice Dining Awards, Vic's received 3rd Place in the Best Ice Cream Parlor category.
