= William Land Park =

City park in Sacramento, California

Coordinates: 38.5408°N 121.4993°W

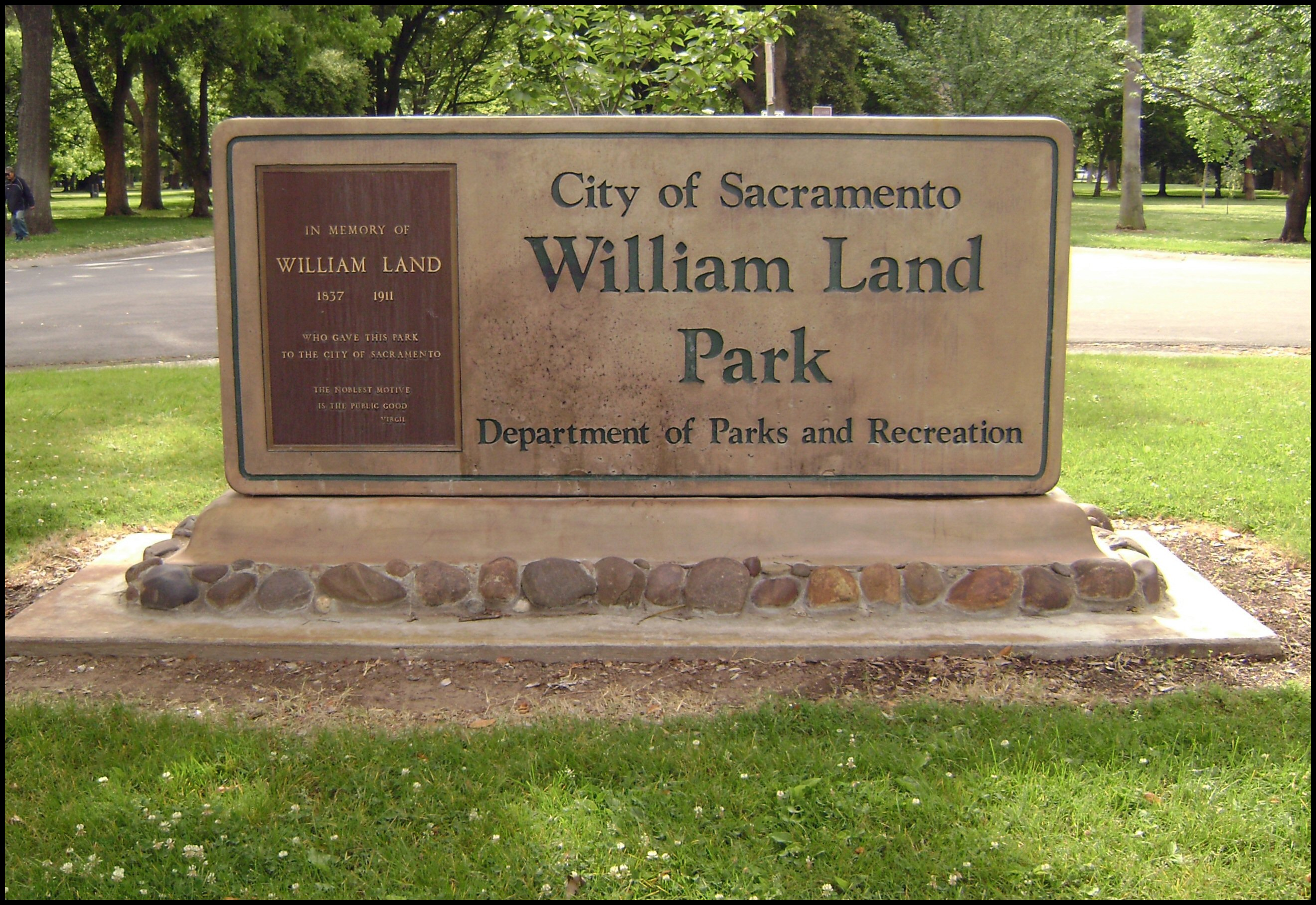
William Land Park Sacramento on site of former Sutterville

William Land Park, frequently referred to as simply "Land Park" is a major city park in Sacramento, California. The park is located between Interstate 5 and State Route 160.

William Land was a pioneer who built the Western Hotel at the NE corner of 2nd and K St in 1875 (California Historical Landmark #601). There is an elementary school named after him. He is buried in a Greek temple mausoleum within East Lawn Memorial Park in Sacramento. William Land was a founder of the East Lawn Memorial.

There are several city attractions located within the park including:

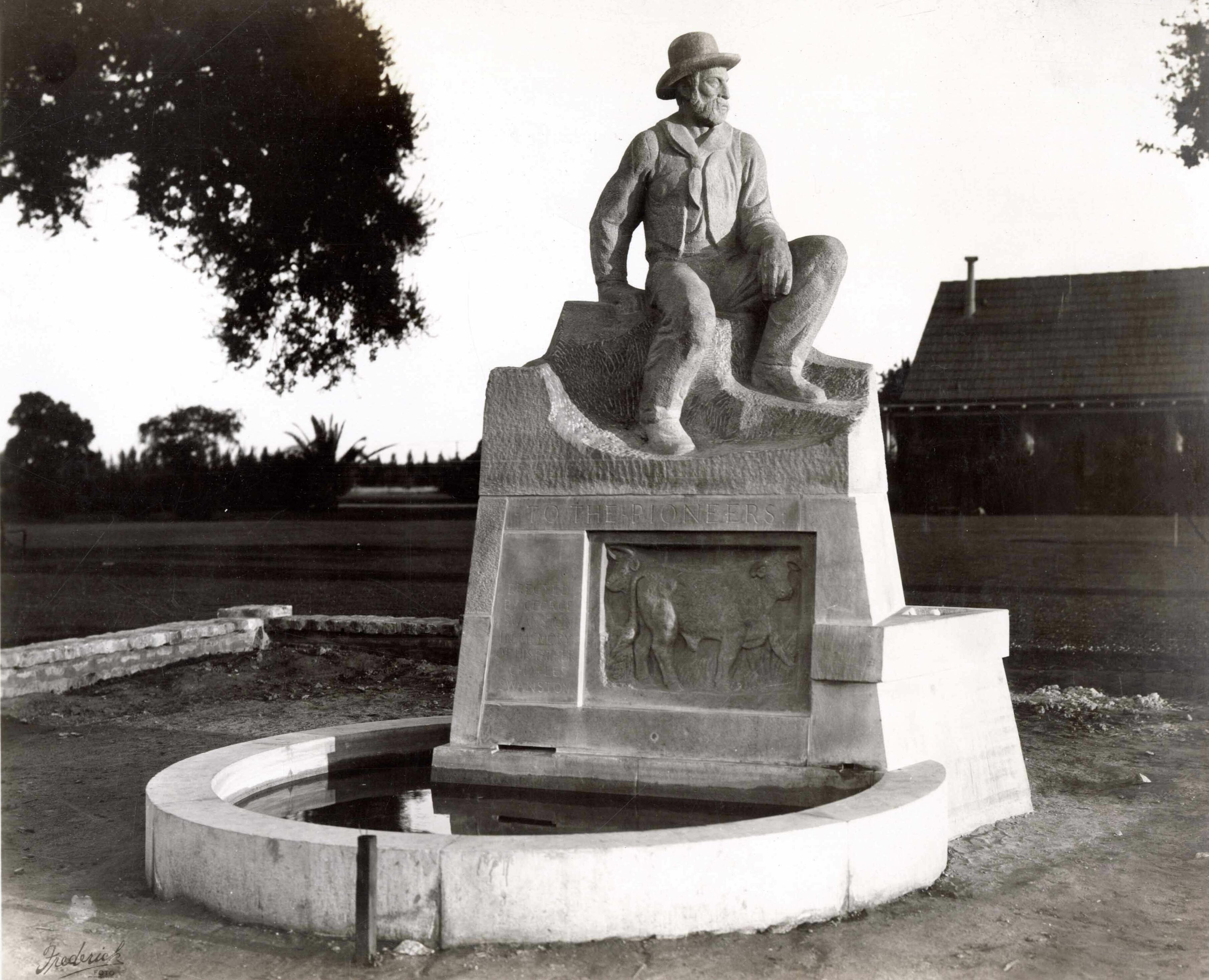
Swanston Memorial, c. 1924.

- The Sacramento Zoo
- Fairytale Town, a park which has play equipment designed to represent articles from various fairy tales and nursery rhymes (there is a small admission fee).
- The William Land Golf Course
- Funderland, a small park with several carnival like rides primarily for very young children.

"Land Park" can also refer to the surrounding neighborhood.

- Vic's Ice Cream – landmark restaurant in the neighborhood.

William Land Park was mentioned in Sir Mix-A-Lot's 1992 rap song "A Rapper's Reputation".

== Gallery ==
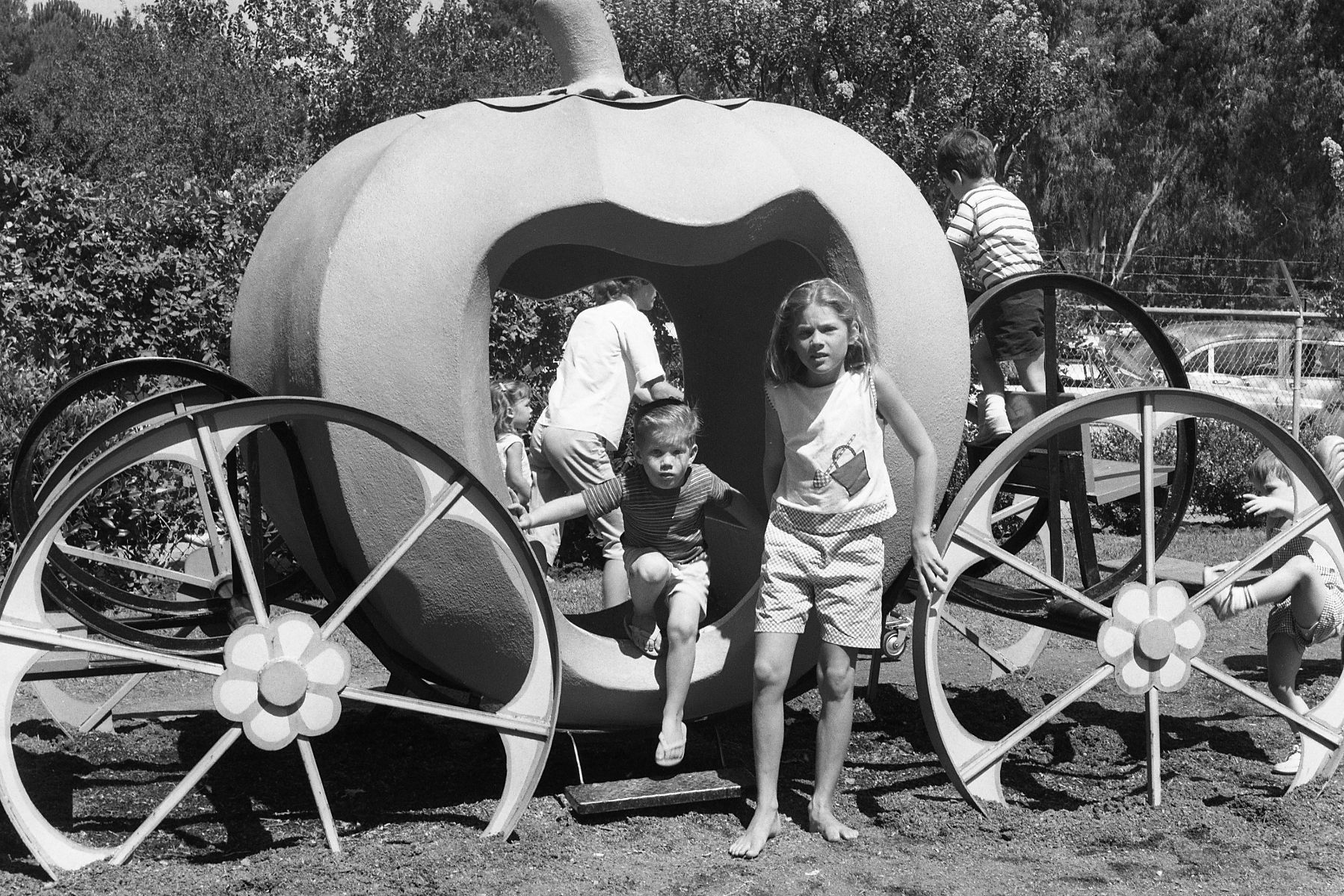
Children leaving a pumpkin ride in Fairytale Town, 1963

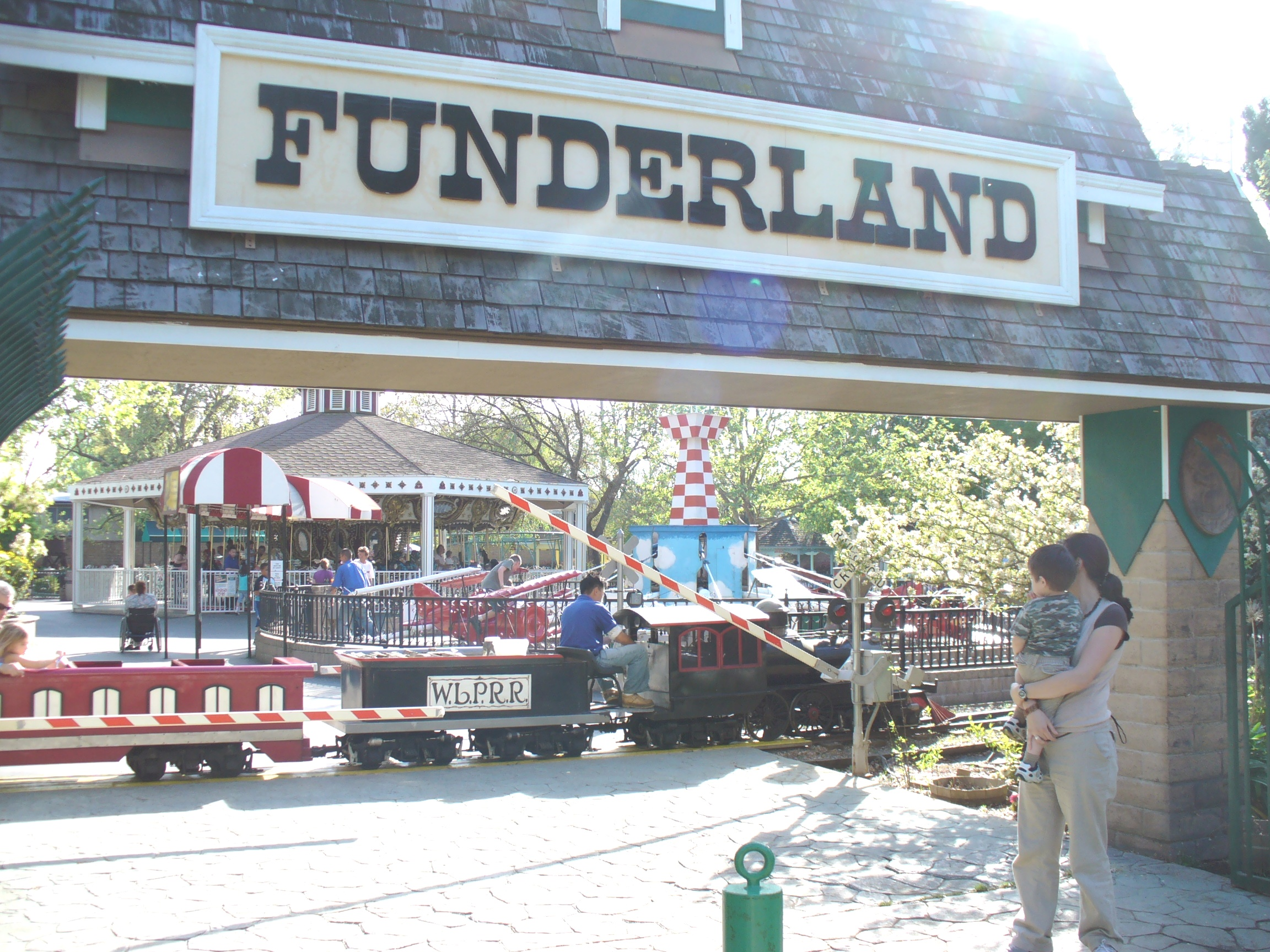
The entrance to Funderland in Land Park

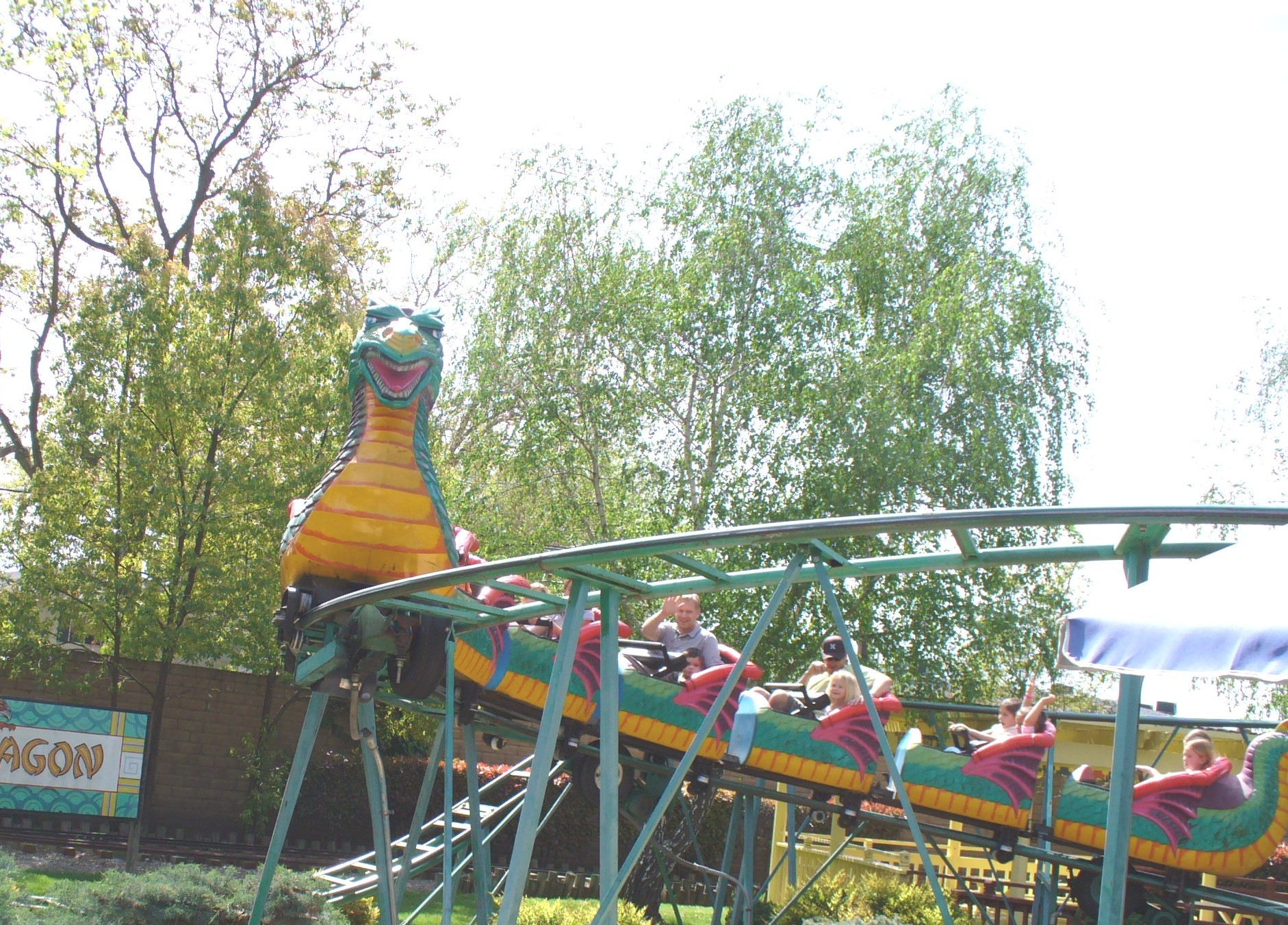
A dragon thrill ride for kids at Funderland

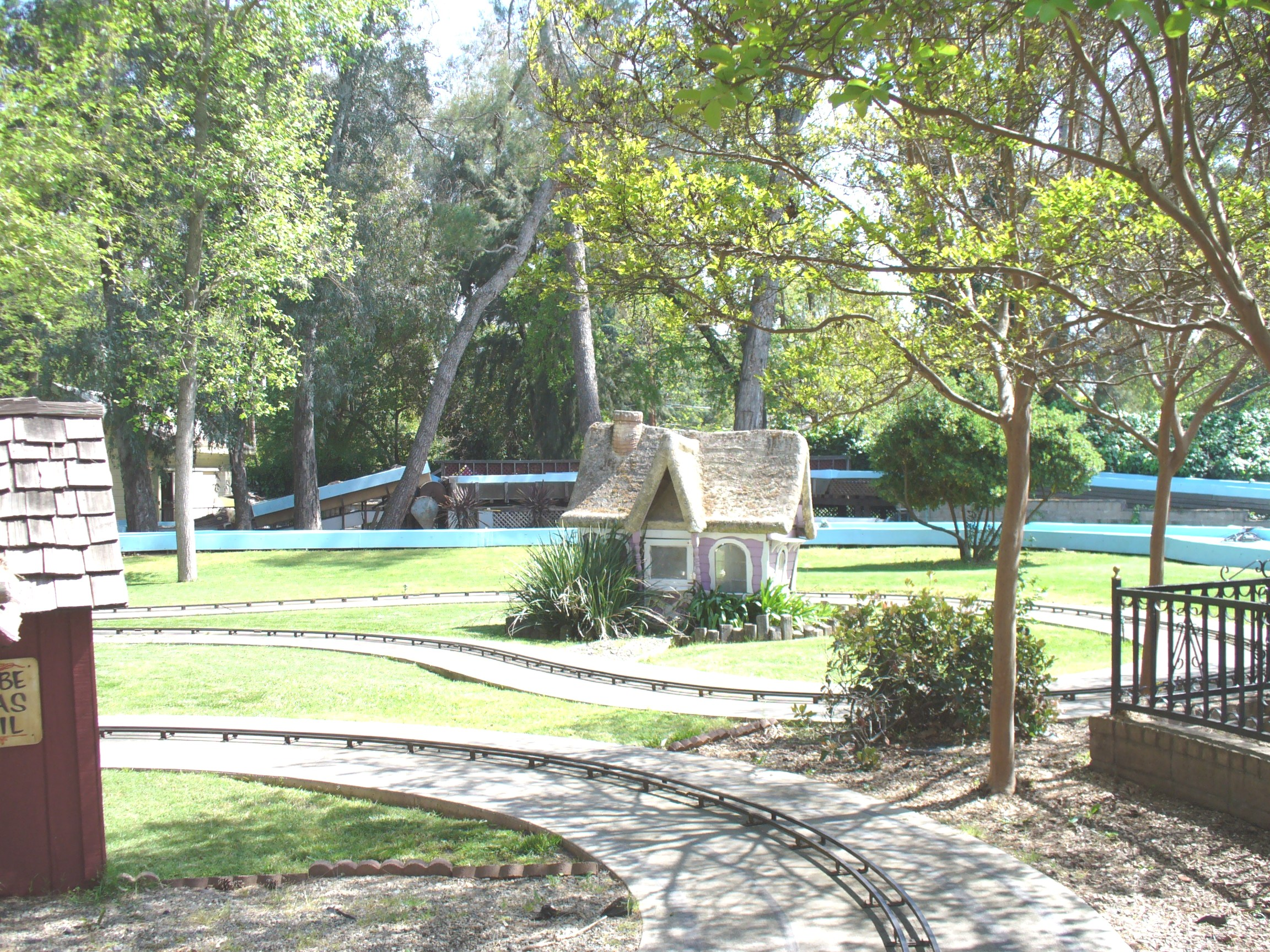
A Car ride at Funderland

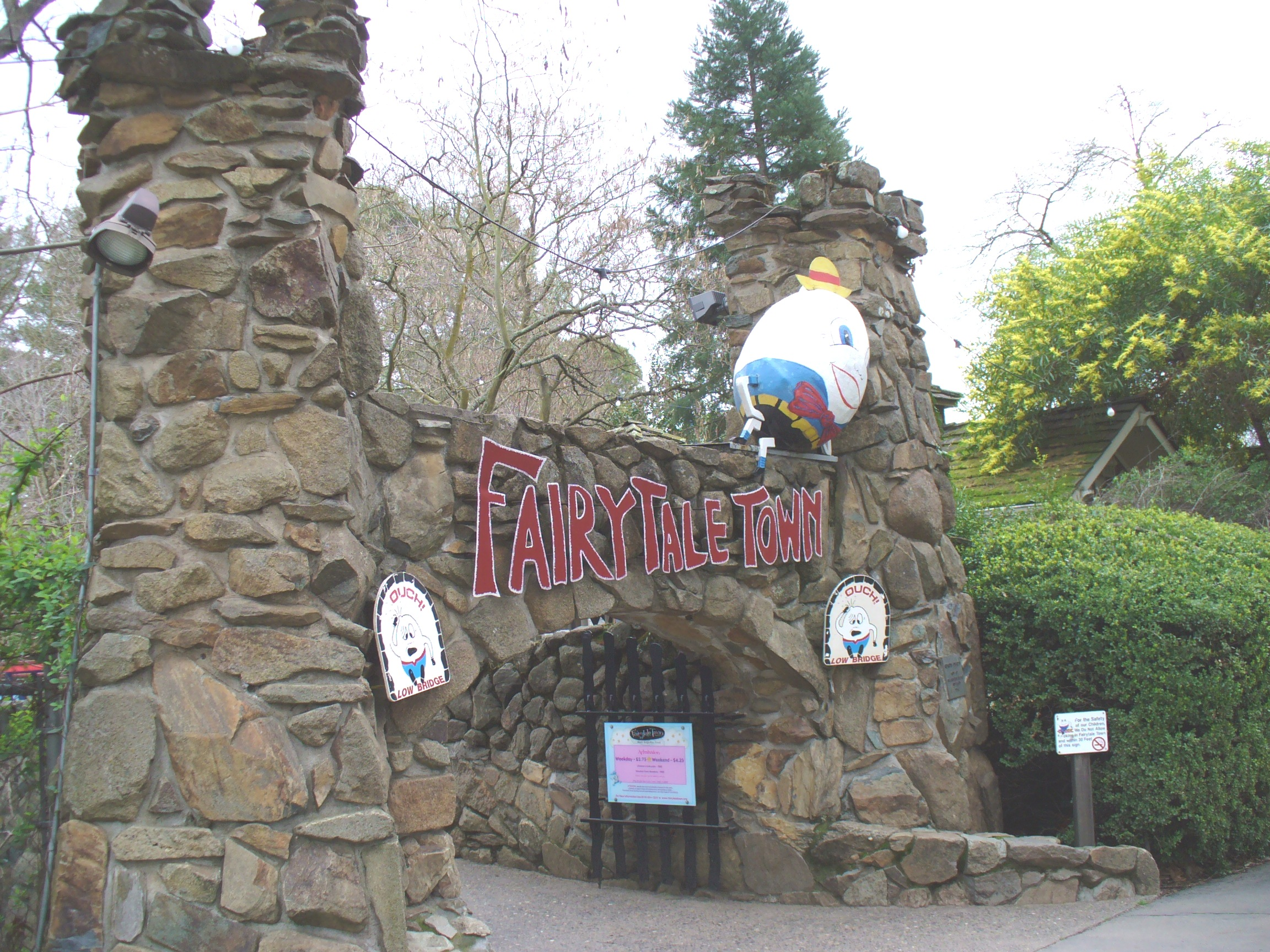
The Entrance to Fairytale Town at Land Park

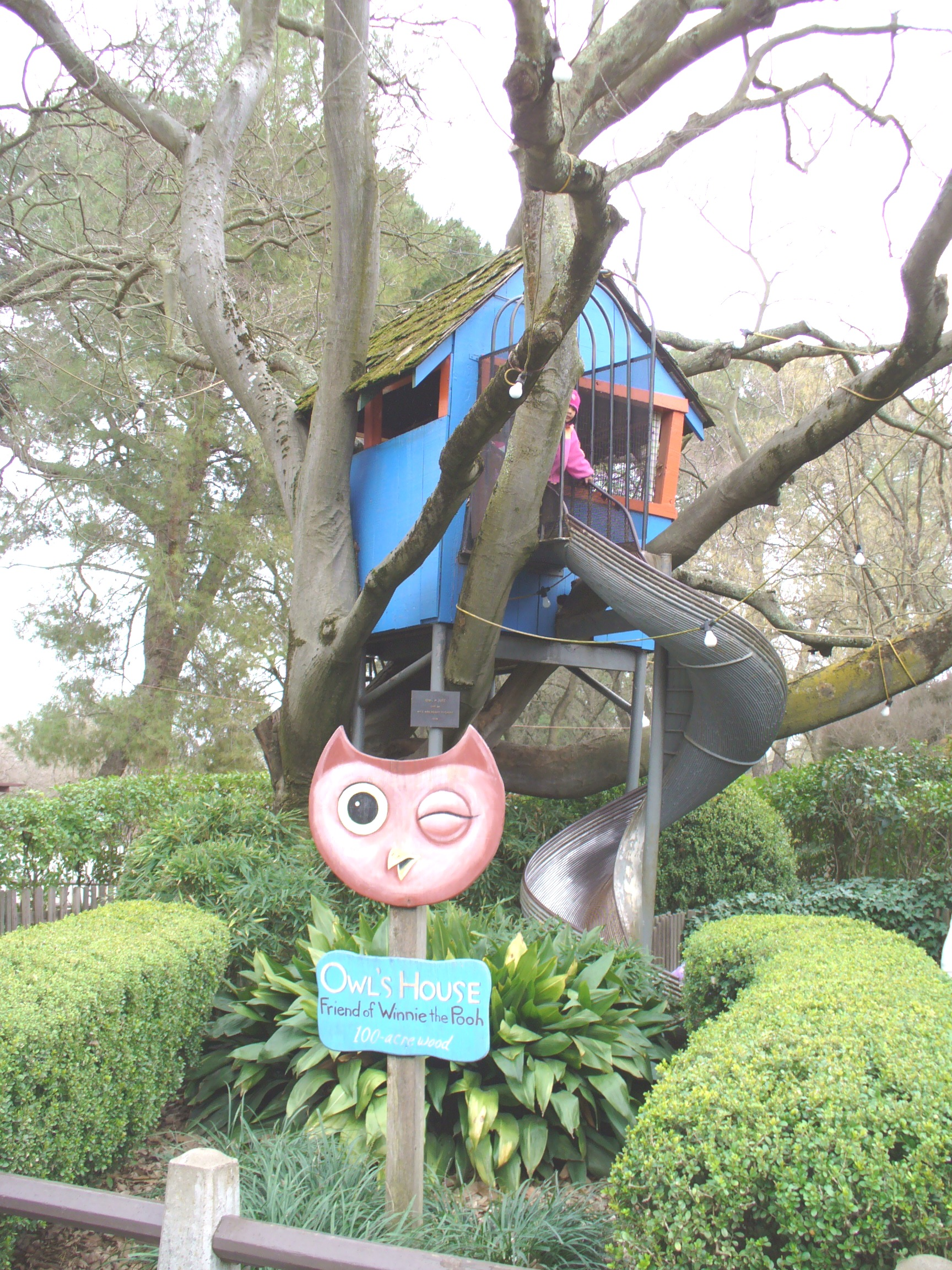
A slide at Fairytale Town in Land Park

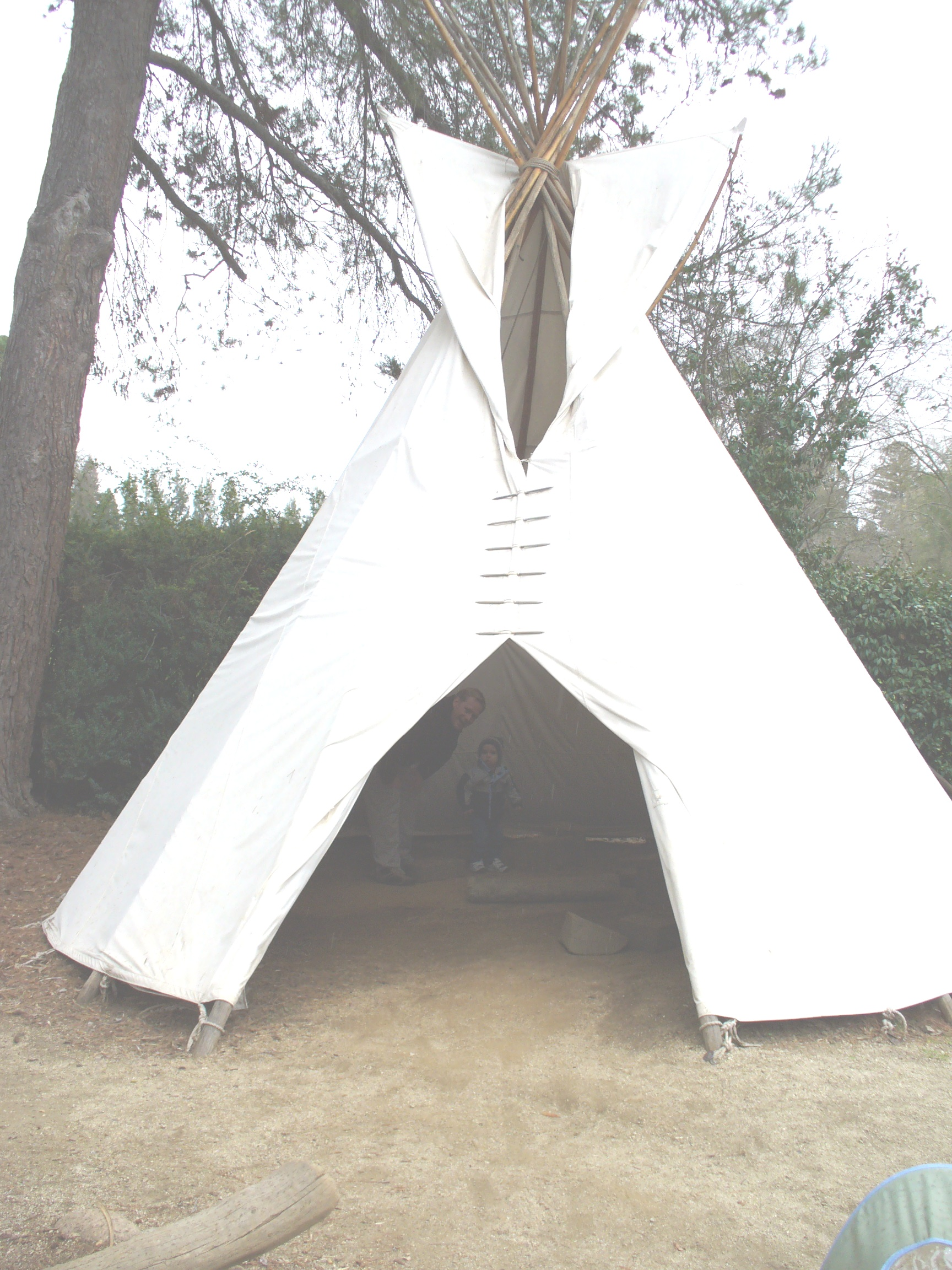
Fairytale Town

== See also ==
- Urban park
- Western Hotel (Sacramento, California)
