= Sacramento Zoo =

Zoo in Sacramento, California, United States

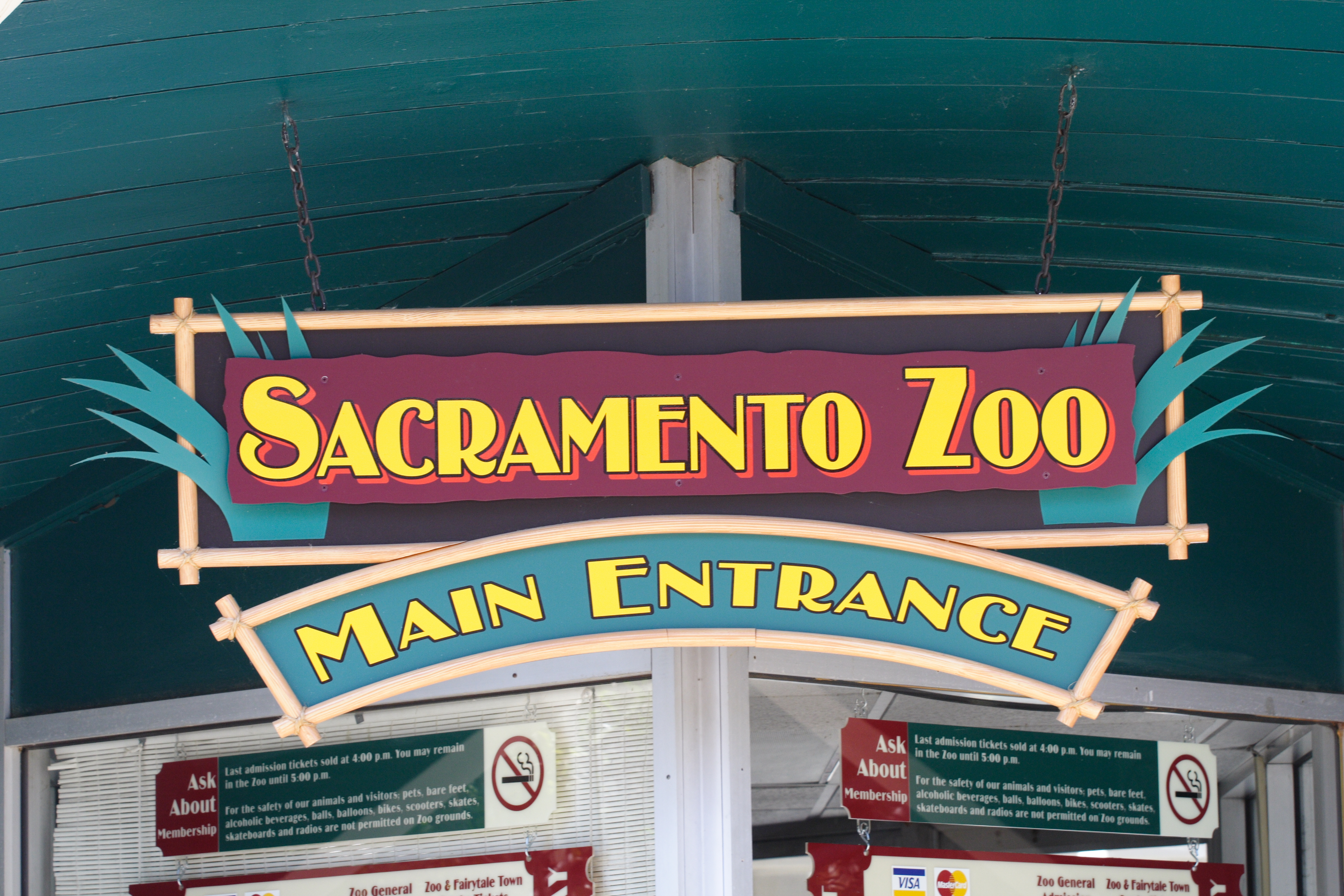
- Interactive map of Sacramento Zoo
- 38.539605°N 121.504026°W
- Date opened: June 2, 1927
- Location: William Land Park, Sacramento, California, United States
- Land area: 14.3 acres (5.8 ha)
- No. of animals: Just over 500(2012)
- Memberships: AZA
- Website: www.saczoo.org

The Sacramento Zoo is a zoo located in William Land Park in Sacramento, California, United States. It opened on June 2, 1927, with 40 animals and occupied 4.2 acres (1.7 ha). In the early 1960s, the zoo expanded to a 14.3-acre site (5.8 ha). As of December 2012, the zoo had just over 500 animals on site.

== History ==
The zoo opened as the 4.2-acre (1.7 ha) "William Land Park Zoo" on June 2, 1927, with 40 animals brought together from various local parks, including monkeys, raccoons, birds, and deer.

In 1948, the Sacramento Union newspaper sponsored a drive to raise money to buy the zoo an elephant. In the fall of 1949, SUE (the "Sacramento Union Elephant"), so named by local teenage sisters Jacklyn and Carolyn Bolton via a contest sponsored by the Union, arrived at the zoo, much to the delight of area visitors. In 1955, the zoo bought "Winky", Sue's companion.

The Sacramento Zoological Society formed in 1958 to support and raise funds for the zoo as city funding began to dwindle. The year 1958 also brought along the start of the zoo's educational programming, at that time, one of only nine zoos in the United States to have such a program. In 1997, the society took over day-to-day operation of the zoo.

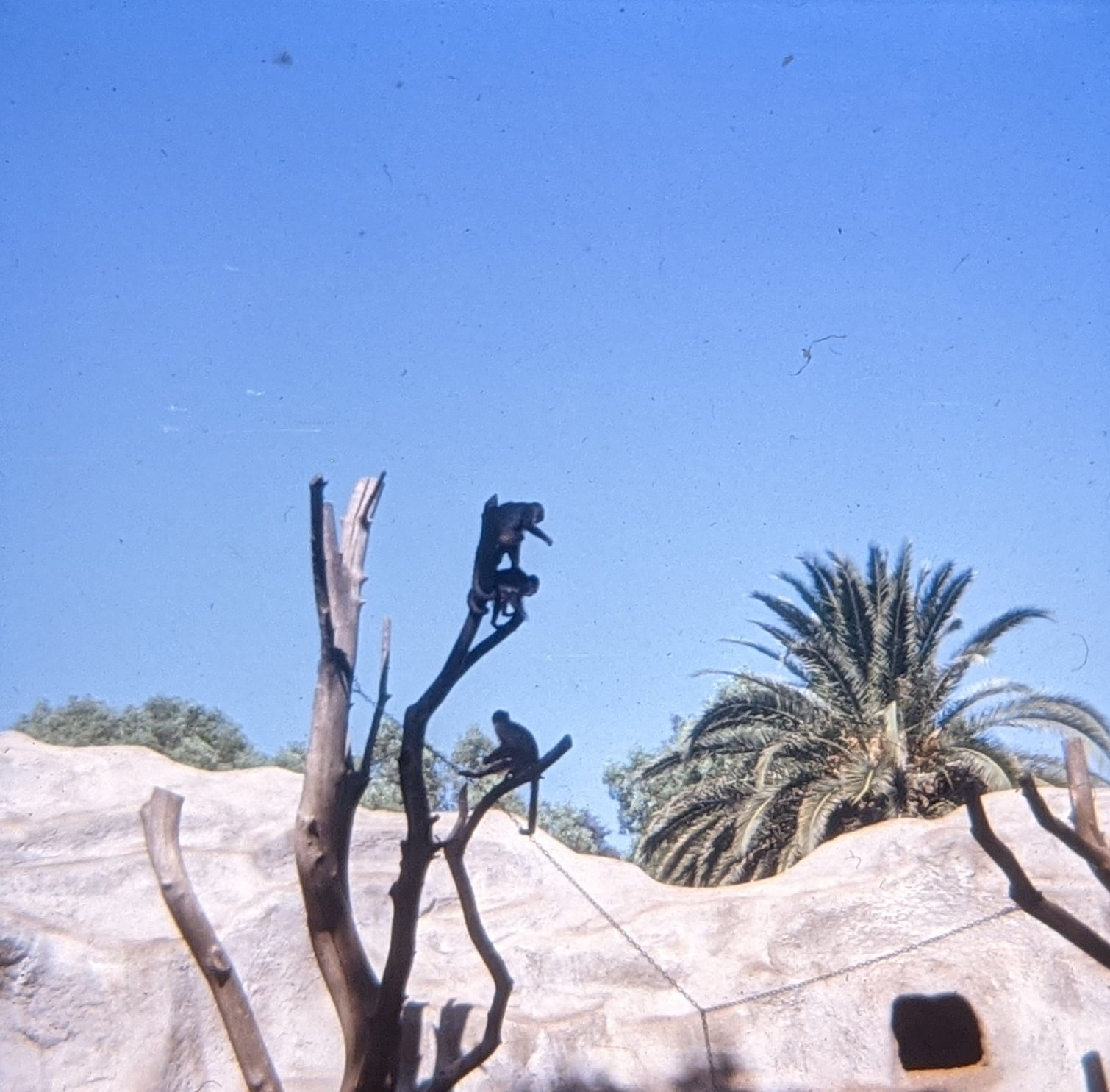
Monkeys in one of the new habits during this time of expansion.

The zoo was expanded to 14.3 acres (5.8 ha) in the early 1960s, with new habitats built in most areas of the zoo. In 1965, the zoo received its first grizzly bear and two orangutans, and began charging 25 cents for admission. The current name was adopted in 1970, along with the completion of the reptile house and the creation of a docent program.

On April 6, 2007, an exhibit featuring six penguins opened to the public. The day prior, Mayor Heather Fargo and other guests were dressed in black and white to greet the new arrivals, who were on loan for the "one year bash".

In 2009, the zoo started construction on a new barn and yard for their giraffes. The old wooden barn was demolished and replaced with a much more spacious, heated barn. The new barn includes a breeding facility with many large stalls for current giraffes and their calves. The Tall Wonders giraffe habitat has a pavilion for visitors to get an eye to eye view of the giraffes. The new facility opened on February 12, 2010.

In 2011, brought along the grand opening of a new river otter exhibit, complete with glass that enabled visitors to walk up to visitors and interact with the very sociable North American river otters in their naturalistic habitat.

In September 2014, the zoo opened Small Wonders of Africa with aardvarks, Wolf's guenon, red-billed hornbill, and other creatures.

The zoo is working on replacing its current Reptile House with a Biodiversity Center.

In November 2018, zoo officials have explored the possibility of moving the zoo to the former ARCO Arena site in Natomas, citing the need for more space and the constraints of their current location; however, the Sacramento Kings of the National Basketball Association controls the arena site and have conflicting plans to build a mixed-use development on the site. 35 acres (10 hectares) of the former ARCO Arena site were donated to California Northstate University to build its new medical center.

In June 2020, a red panda named Amaya gave birth to her second cub at the Sacramento zoo.

In 2024, plans were made to relocate the Zoo the suburban community of Elk Grove, about fifteen miles south of the current location, where it would be able to occupy a much larger space with improved facilities. In April 2025, the relocation project was cancelled due to financial concerns. The city council approved an expansion plan at the current site.

== Gallery ==
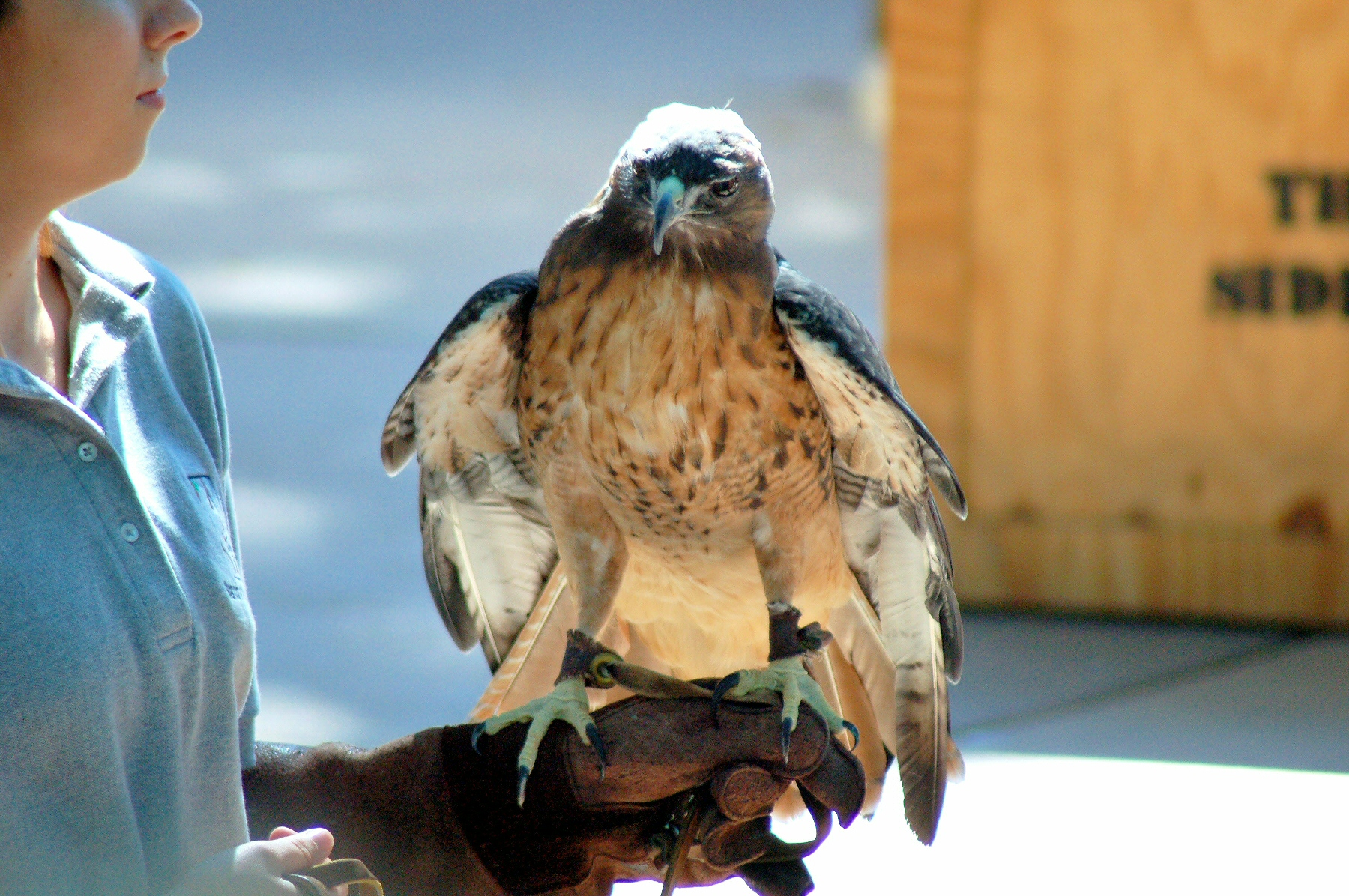
Red-tailed Hawk with handler.

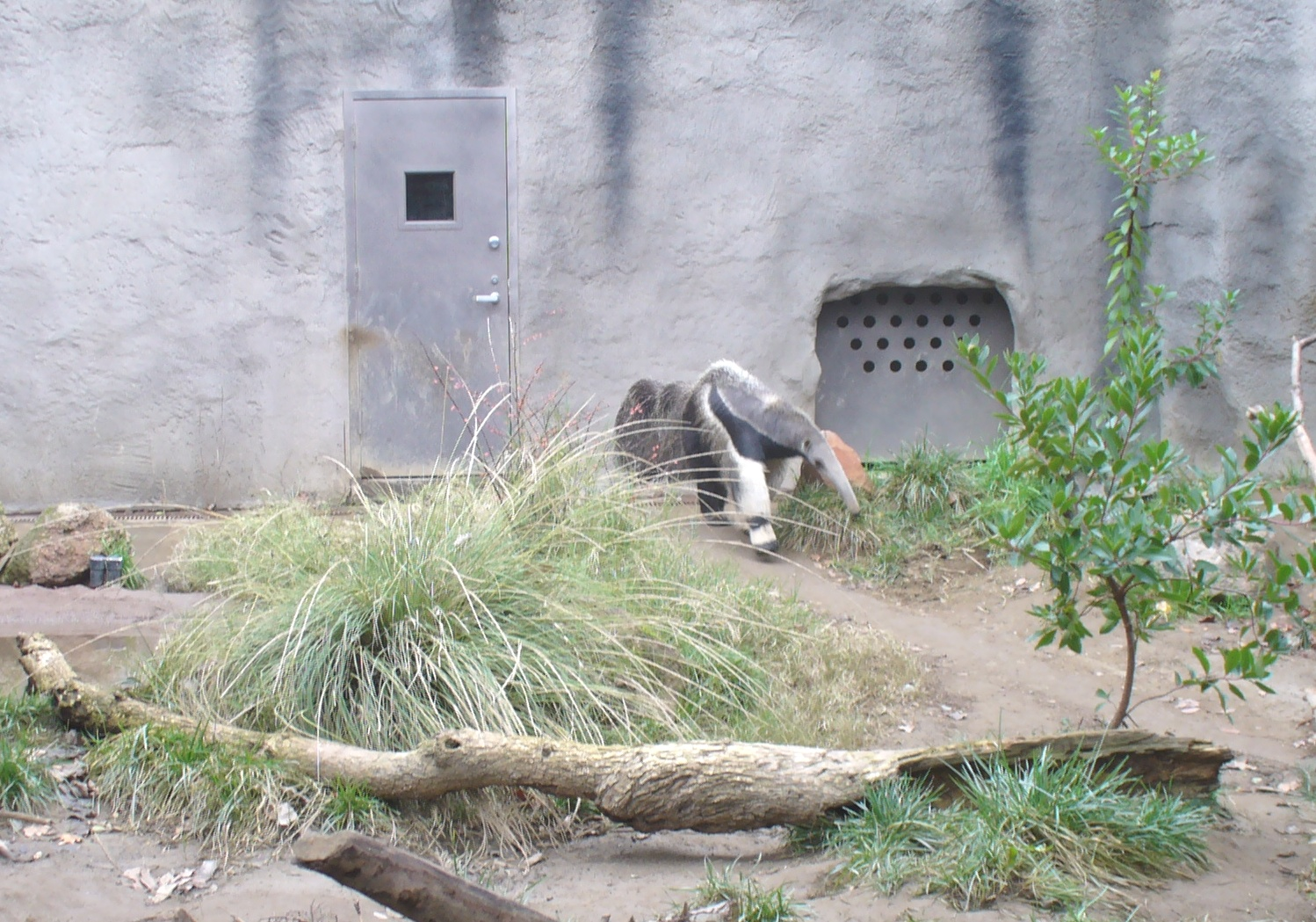
Anteater.

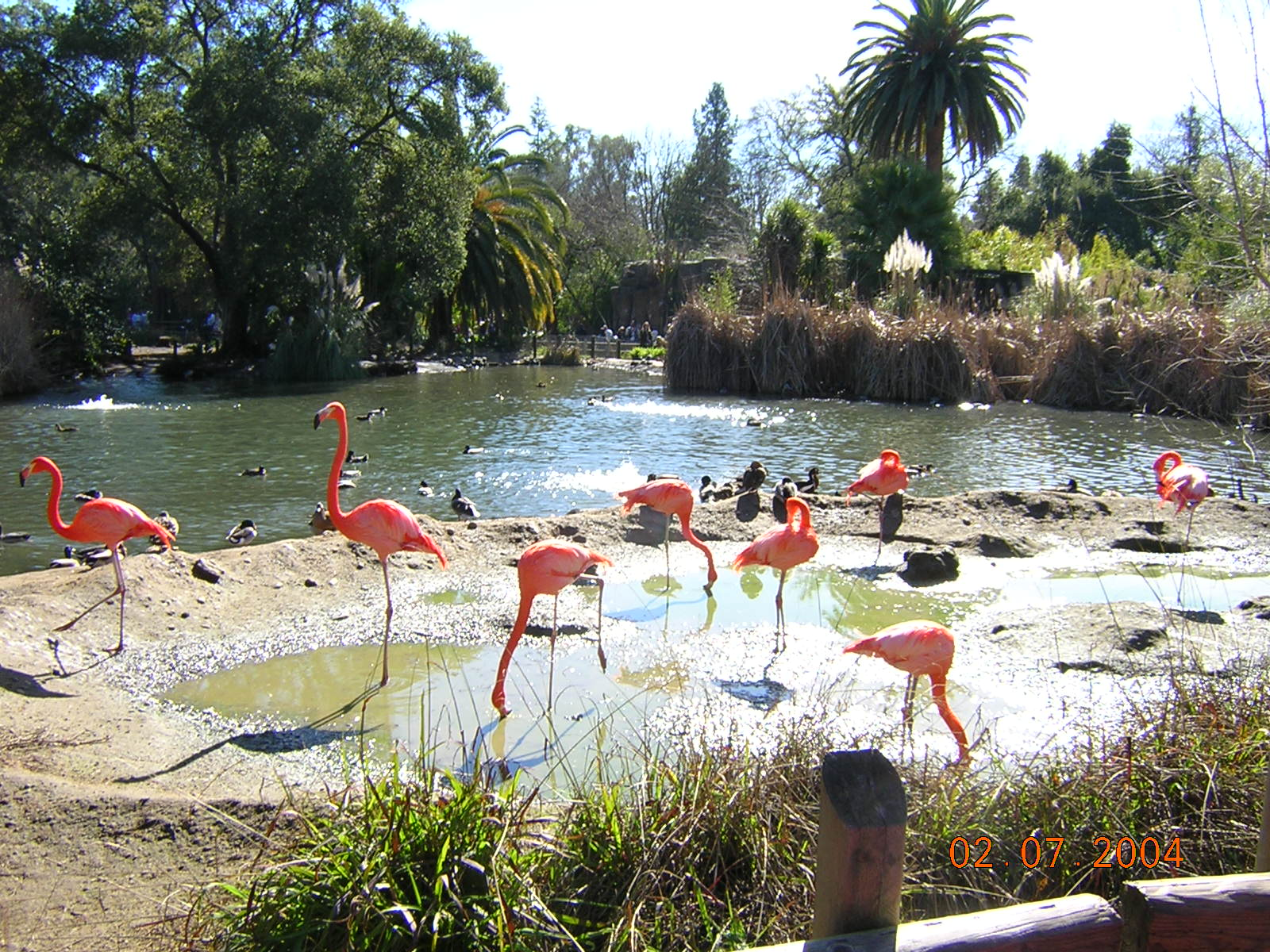
Flamingos in an exhibit.

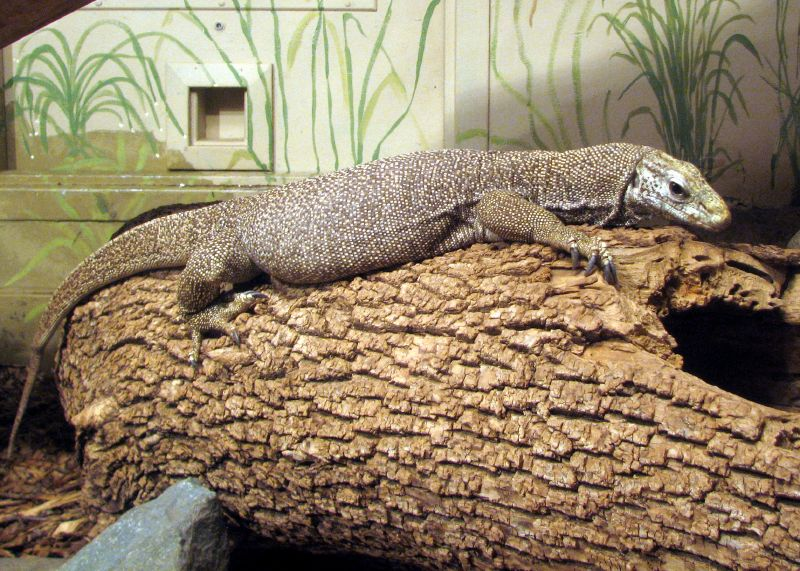
Bengal monitor (Varanus bengalensis).

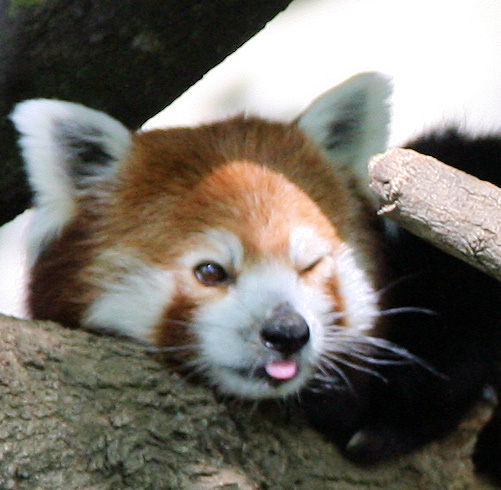
Red panda (Ailurus fulgens).
