= Illinois–Poland National Guard Partnership =

Illinois–Poland State Partnership
- Part of the U.S. European Command State Partnership Program
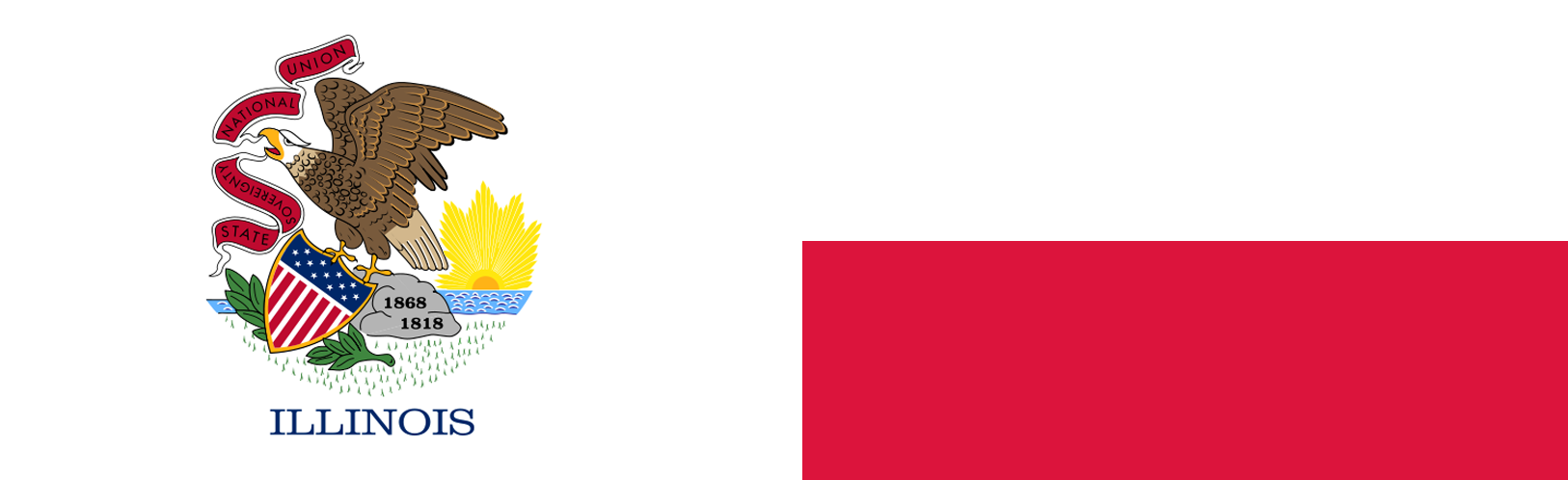
- Origin: 1993
- Country president: Andrzej Duda
- Prime minister: Mateusz Morawiecki
- Minister of defense: Mariusz Błaszczak
- Ambassador to U.S.: Marek Magierowski
- Ambassador to Poland: Mark Brzezinski
- Adjutant general: Richard Neely
- 2012 Engagements: 16
- NATO member: Yes (1999)
- EU member: Yes (2003)

The Illinois–Poland National Guard Partnership is one of 25 European partnerships that make up the U.S. European Command State Partnership Program and one of 88 worldwide partnerships that make-up the National Guard State Partnership Program. The relationship between the Illinois National Guard and the Republic of Poland is an enduring partnership that was established in 1993. The primary focus is split between support of ISAF Operational training and co-deployment, Professional Military Education, Transformation of the Forces, Crisis Management and Response, and Defense Support of Civil Authorities.

== History ==
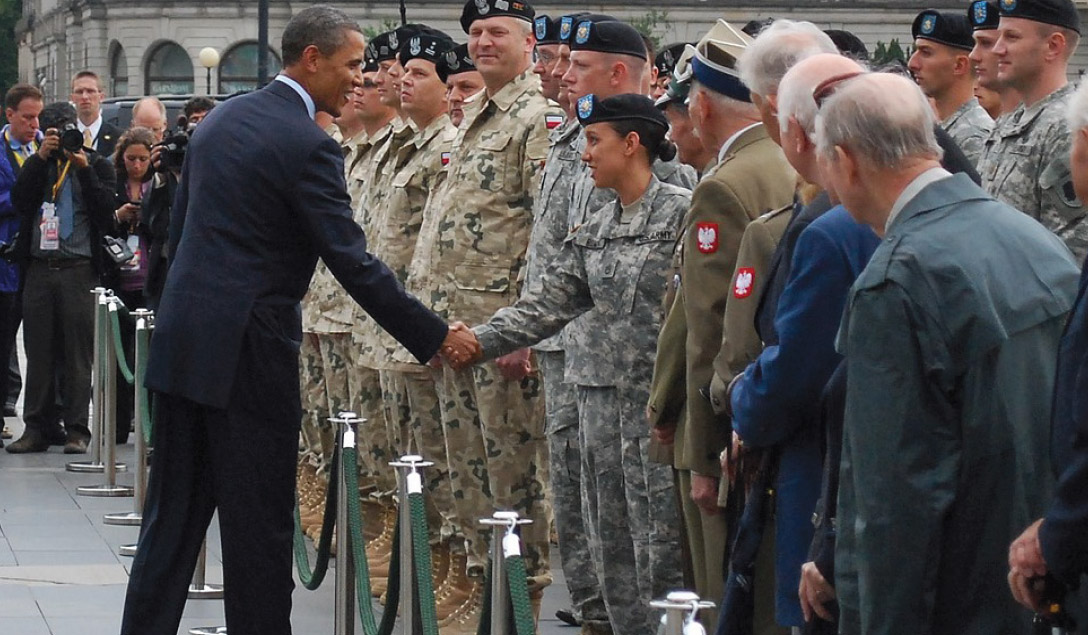
President Obama meets with soldiers from Poland and the Illinois Guard during a visit to Poland

"Illinois has served with Polish forces overseas since the start of combat operations in Iraq and Afghanistan. We are serving alongside our Polish brothers-in-arms as equals." - MG William Enyart, former Adjutant General, Illinois National Guard

Background information:

- State Partnership was established 14 JUL 93
- Member of NATO(1999), the EU (2004), the United Nations, and World Trade Organization
- The most populous of the eastern European states and the 34th most populous in the world
- Poland has had a democratic government since 1989

Established in July 1993, the State Partnership Program (SPP) between Illinois and Poland was one of the first SPP relationships initiated between the National Guard and the former Soviet Eastern Bloc countries. The partnership between Illinois and Poland was influenced by the large Polish population in Illinois. Chicago is recognized as having the largest Polish population outside of Warsaw, with 1.1 million residents of Polish descent.

The Polish Land Forces were in the transformation process in the earlier 1990s when the partnership began. Since then, the partnership has matured from military-to-military exchanges to broad-based civilian exchanges, activities and events. Through the efforts of the Illinois-Poland SPP, the Polish Land Forces are today as capable as their U.S. military counterparts and Poland has been the largest SPP contributing nation to the International Security Assistance Force. Information sharing between the Polish Armed Forces and the Illinois National Guard has increased both organizations intellectual capacity in areas that support combat and stability operations.

An example of collaboration and partnering between a U.S. State and an SPP Partner Nation is the Transatlantic Collaborative Biological Resiliency Demonstration (TaCBRD). This program is a collaborative effort between the U.S. Department of Defense (DOD), the U.S. Department of State (DOS), the U.S. Department of Homeland Security (DHS) and the Republic of Poland. The purpose is to develop and demonstrate the capability to counter a wide area biological incident that impacts U.S. or Partner Nation civilian and military personnel and key infrastructure. For wide-area contagious biological threats, TaCBRD focuses on mitigating morbidity through rapid detection and containment. Specifically, the program provides solutions for overseas response and recovery and partner nation collaboration. TaCBRD also enhances relationships and build partner capacity with nation(s) within DOD's European Command (EUCOM) area of responsibility.

The strong partnership continues to positively impact the relationship between the Polish and U.S. people with personal and professional friendships emerging from each exchange.

== Partnership focus ==
Future events between Illinois and Poland will focus on recruiting, retention, family assistance, veterans' affairs, and assistance with the transformation of the Polish National Reserve Force.

Military-to-Military (M2M) events will enable Poland to lead multi-national initiatives within Central Europe that seek to promote regional stability. Additionally, events will include Unit level exchanges, Officer/NCO Professional Development, DSCA / Crisis Management, and National Reserve Force Transformation.

Interagency (Domestic Operations) events will include Counter/Anti Terrorism Collaboration, Disaster Preparedness, and Build Homeland Security Posture via Joint Exercises.

One of the most important events between Illinois and Poland is the Transatlantic Collaborative Biological Resiliency Demonstration (TacBRD) program. This three-year program, which began in 2012 and runs through 2014, will enhance National Defense by increasing resilience to catastrophic events and by providing capability to prepare for, respond to, and recover from a biological attack.

2013 Planned Events:

- Ongoing support of C130 Interoperability
- Ongoing support of co-deployment activity
- Partner with DTRA and Poland for the Transatlantic Collaborative Biological Resiliency Demonstration (TacBRD) program

Future Years Proposed Events:

- Increased activity in military professional development / transformation
- Continued Support of Domestic Operations / Homeland Security (HLS) joint endeavours with DTRA / TaCBRD

== Gallery ==
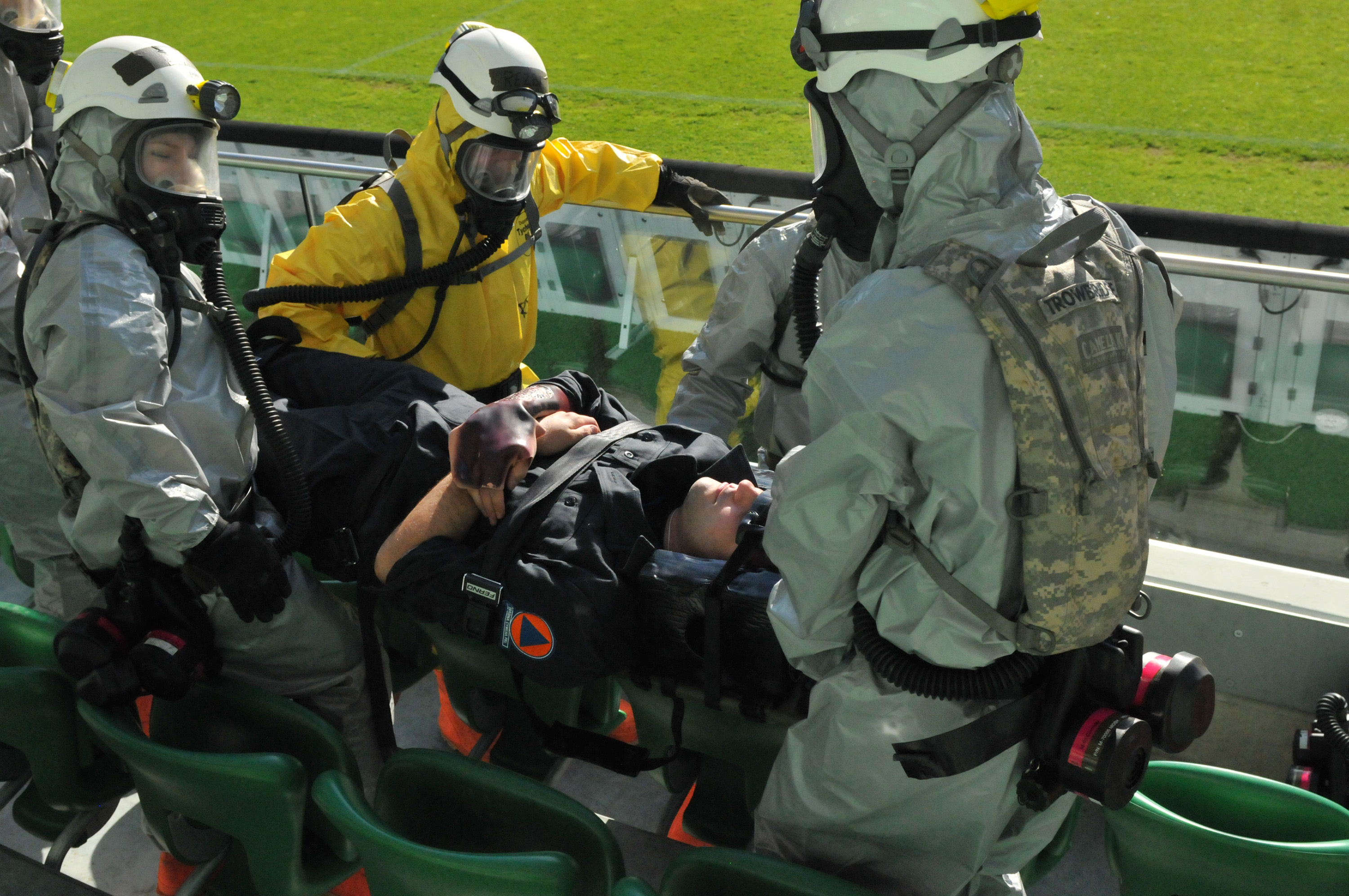
Soldiers from Poland and the Illinois National Guard treat a simulated casualty during an exercise in Warsaw, Poland

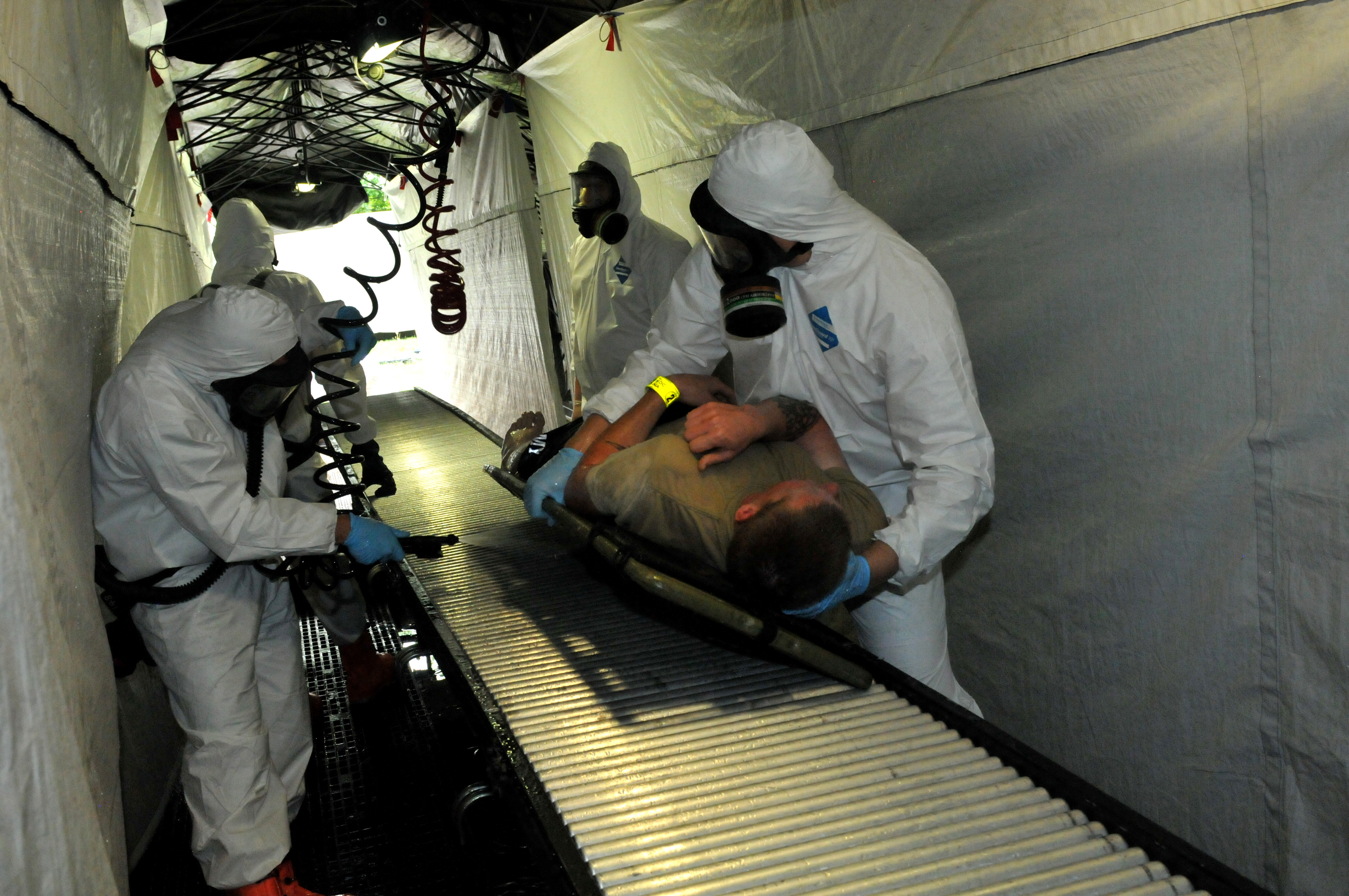
A team of Polish and American Soldiers practice decontamination procedures during a training exercise in Poland

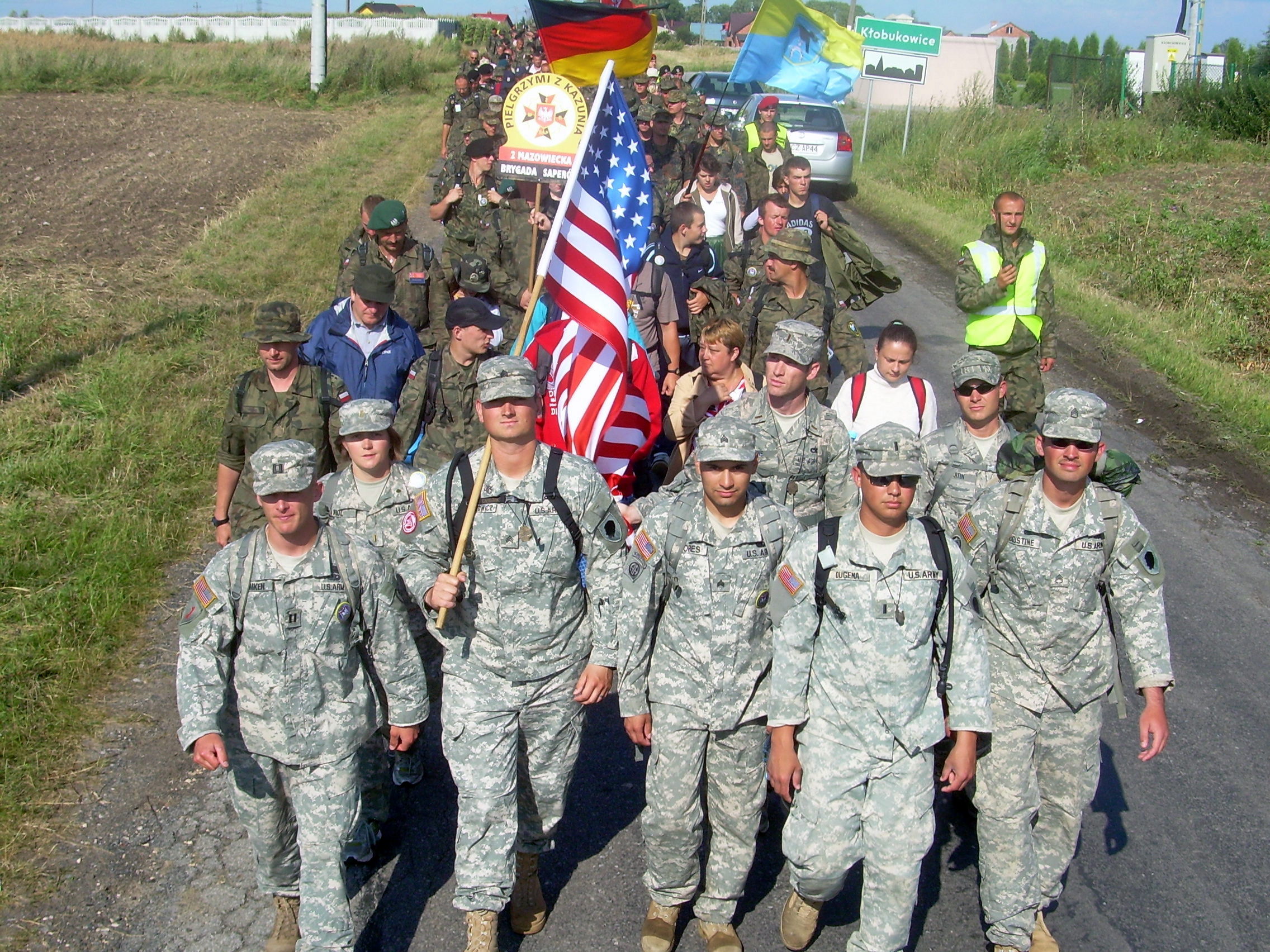
Eight Illinois guardsmen walk with Polish and German Soldiers during an annual pilgrimage from Warsaw to Czestochowa

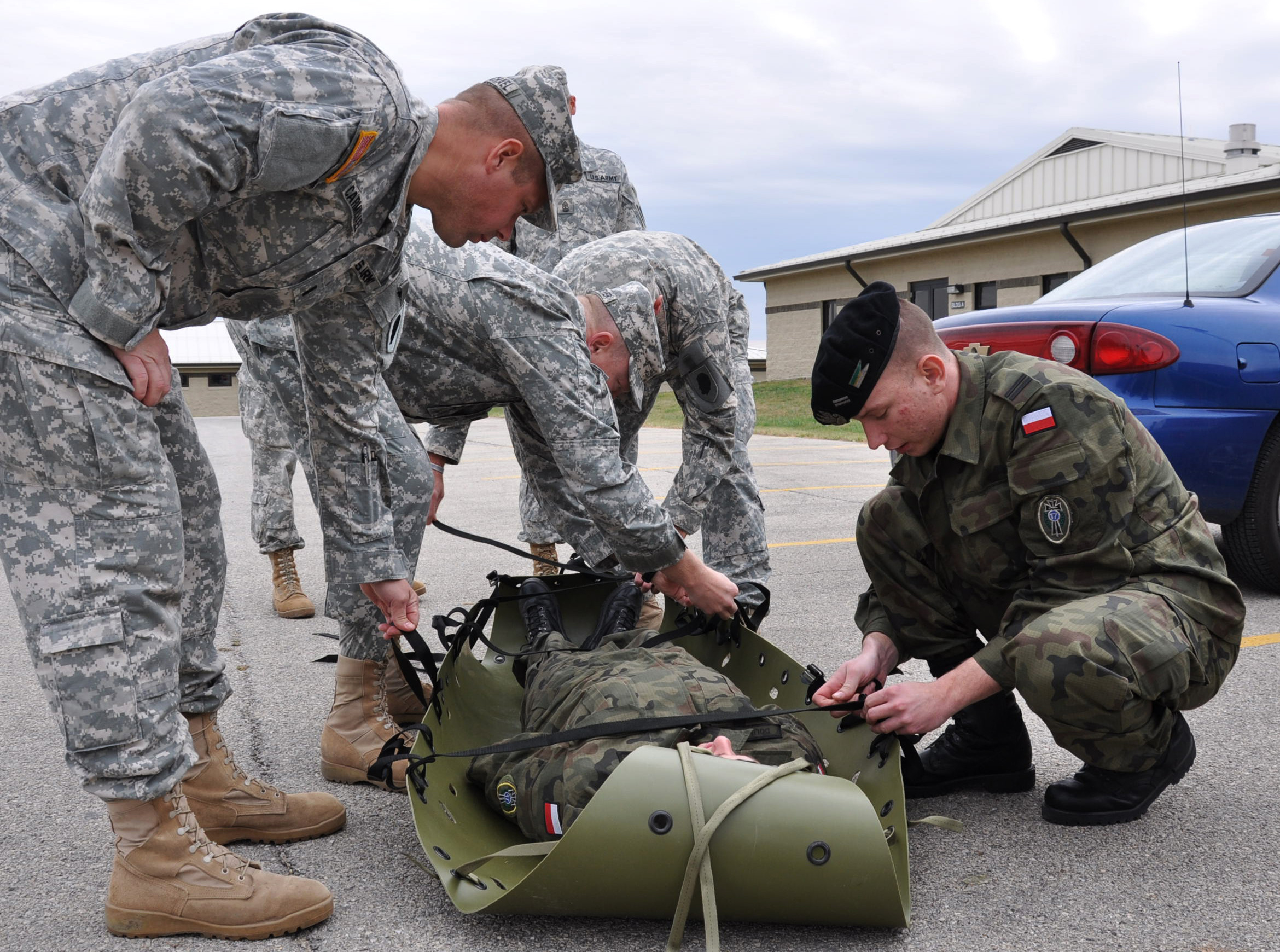
Soldiers with the Illinois Army National Guard and a Polish Soldier conduct medical response and litter use on a simulated casualty
