= U.S. European Command State Partnership Program =

- Origin: 1993
- Authorities: Title 10 (Armed Forces); Title 32 (National Guard); National Defense Auth. Act
- Countries: 22 (2015)
- SPP Expenditures: $4.57M (2015)
- SPP Events: 308 (2015)
- RSM Nations: 19 (2017)
- RSM Troops: 2669 (2017)

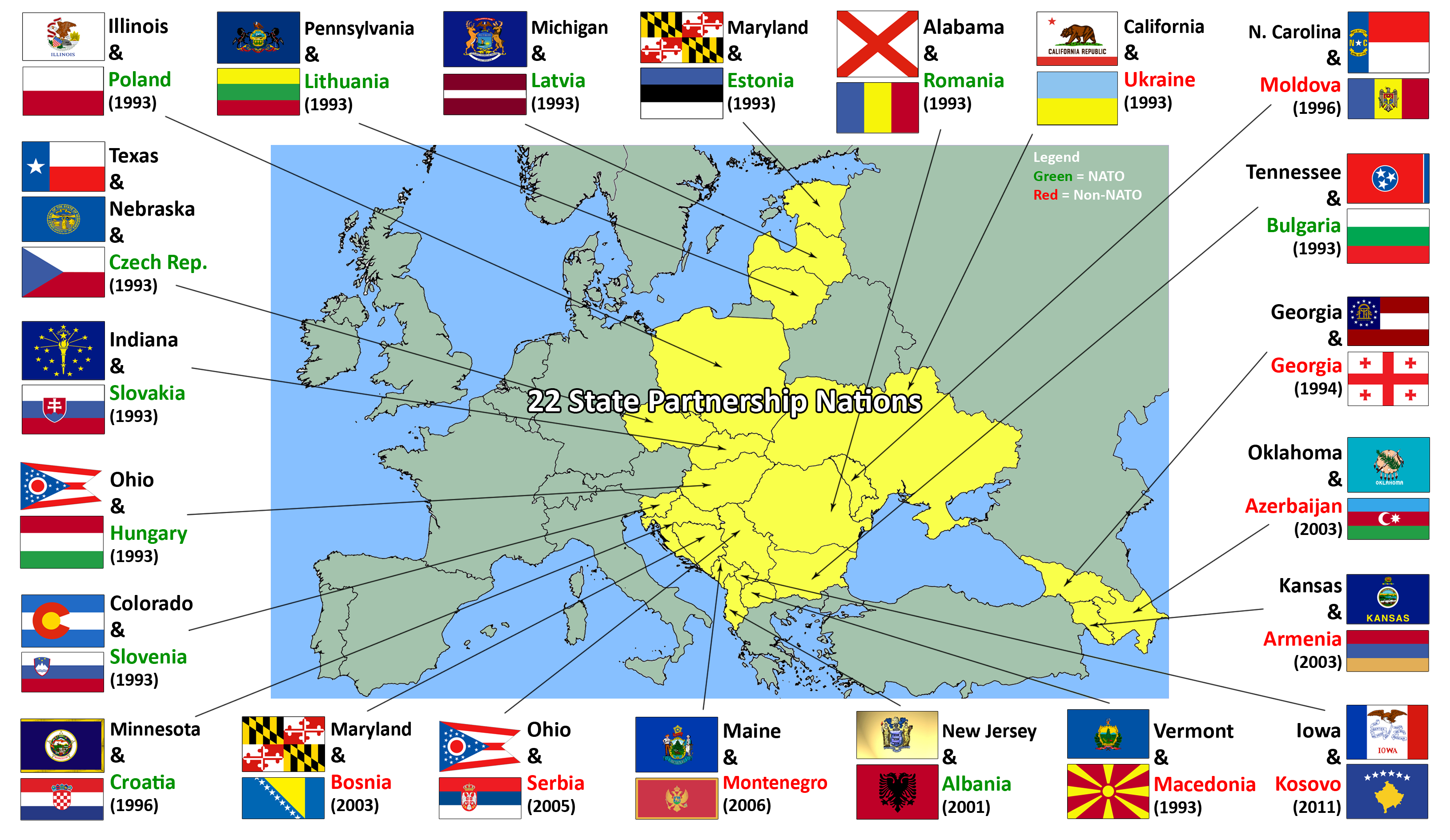
A map of the 22 EUCOM State Partnerships

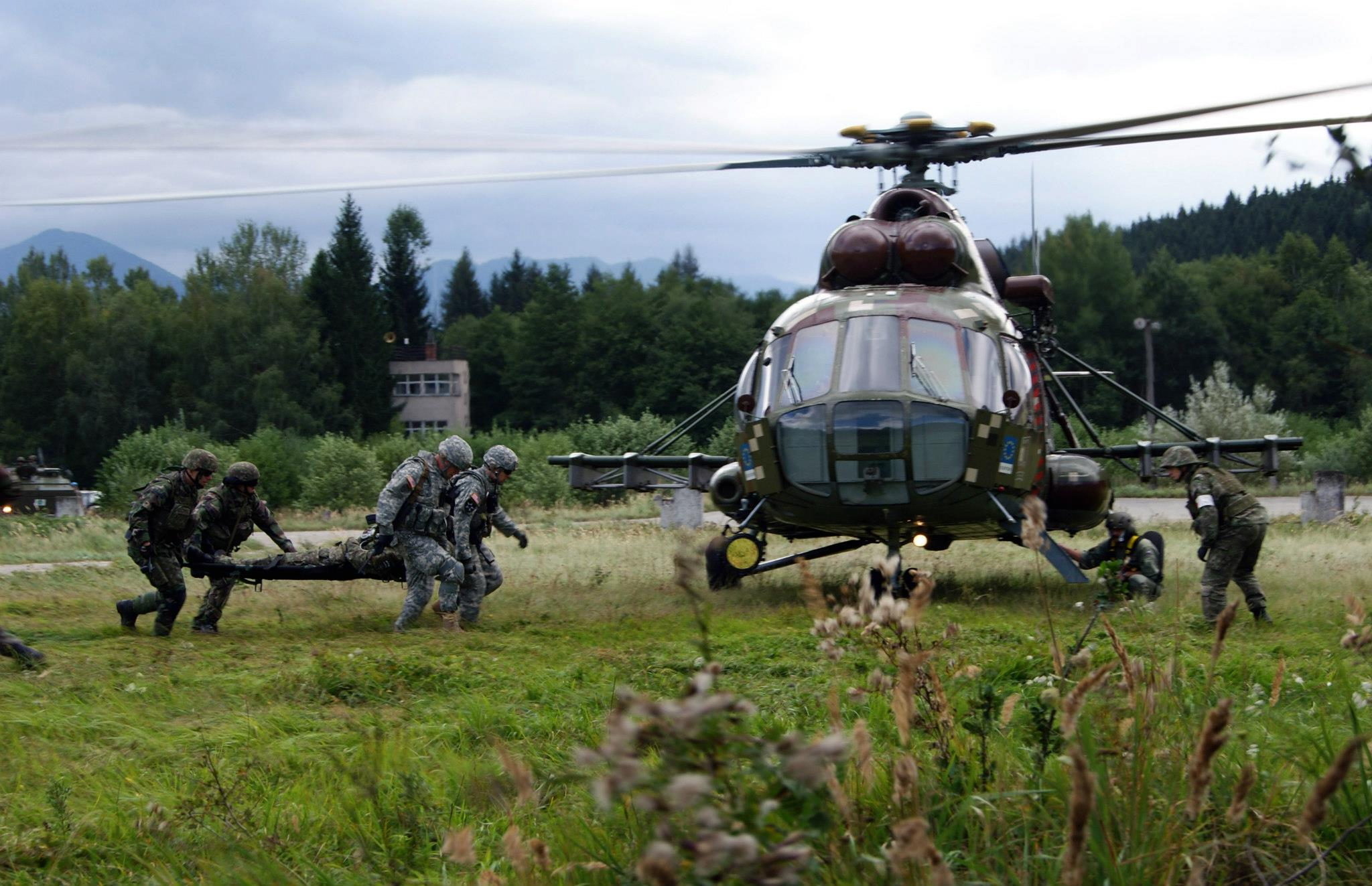
Indiana National Guard and Slovak troops train for medical evacuations in Slovakia

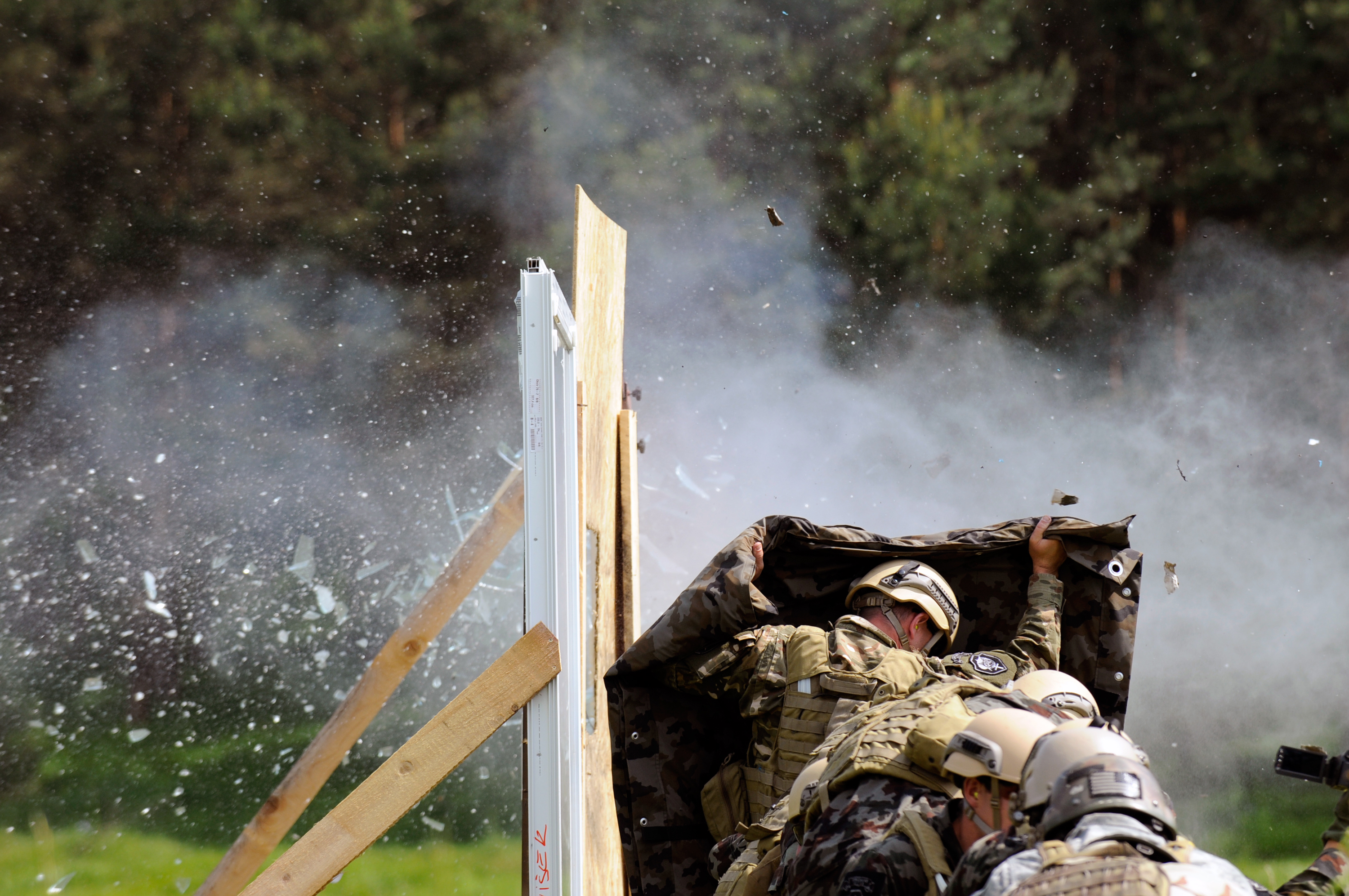
Soldiers from Slovenia and Colorado practice explosive breaching techniques during a three-week Joint Combined Exchange Training exercise in Slovenia

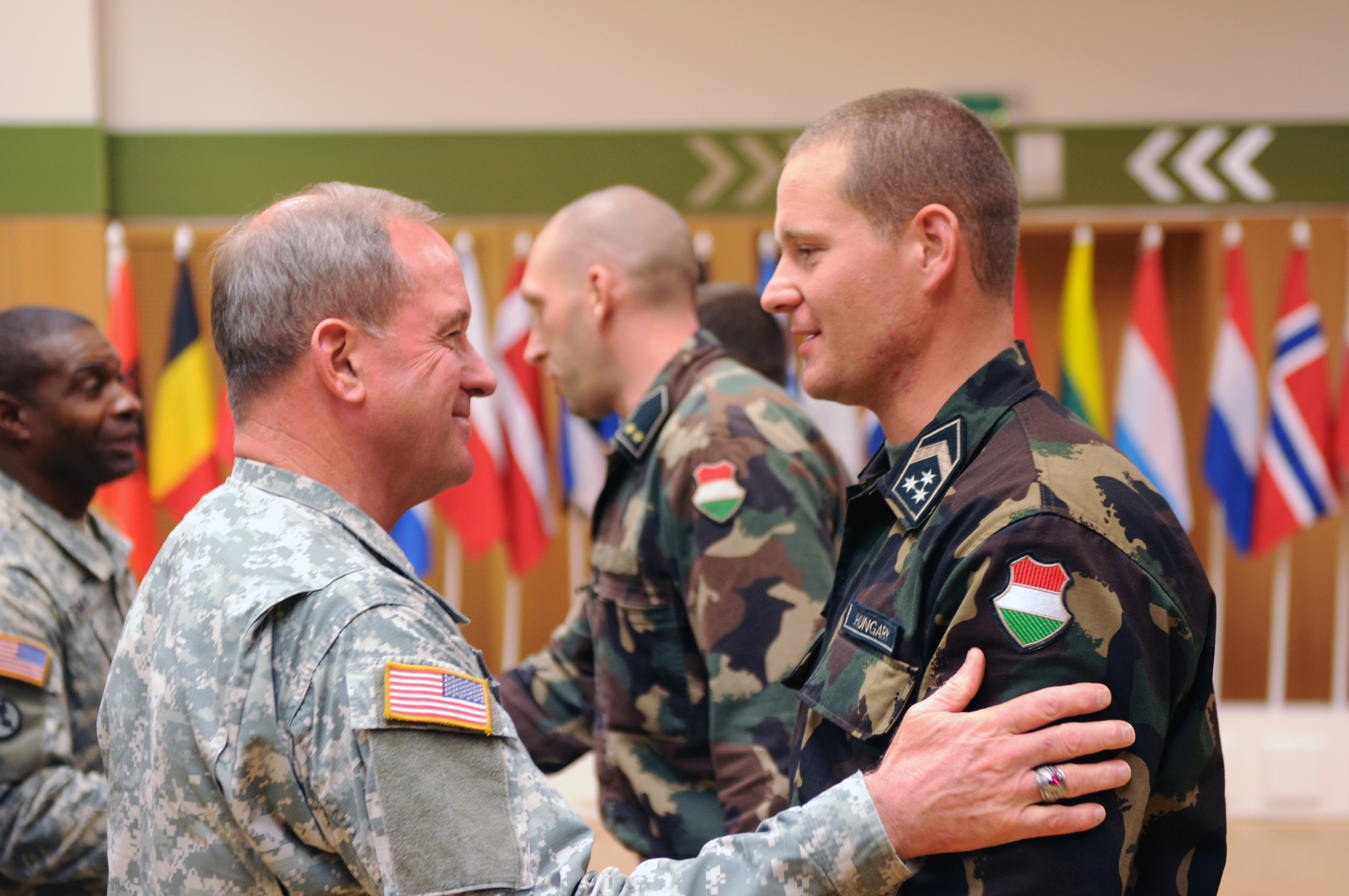
The Ohio TAG awards the Ohio Commendation Medal to Hungarian soldiers

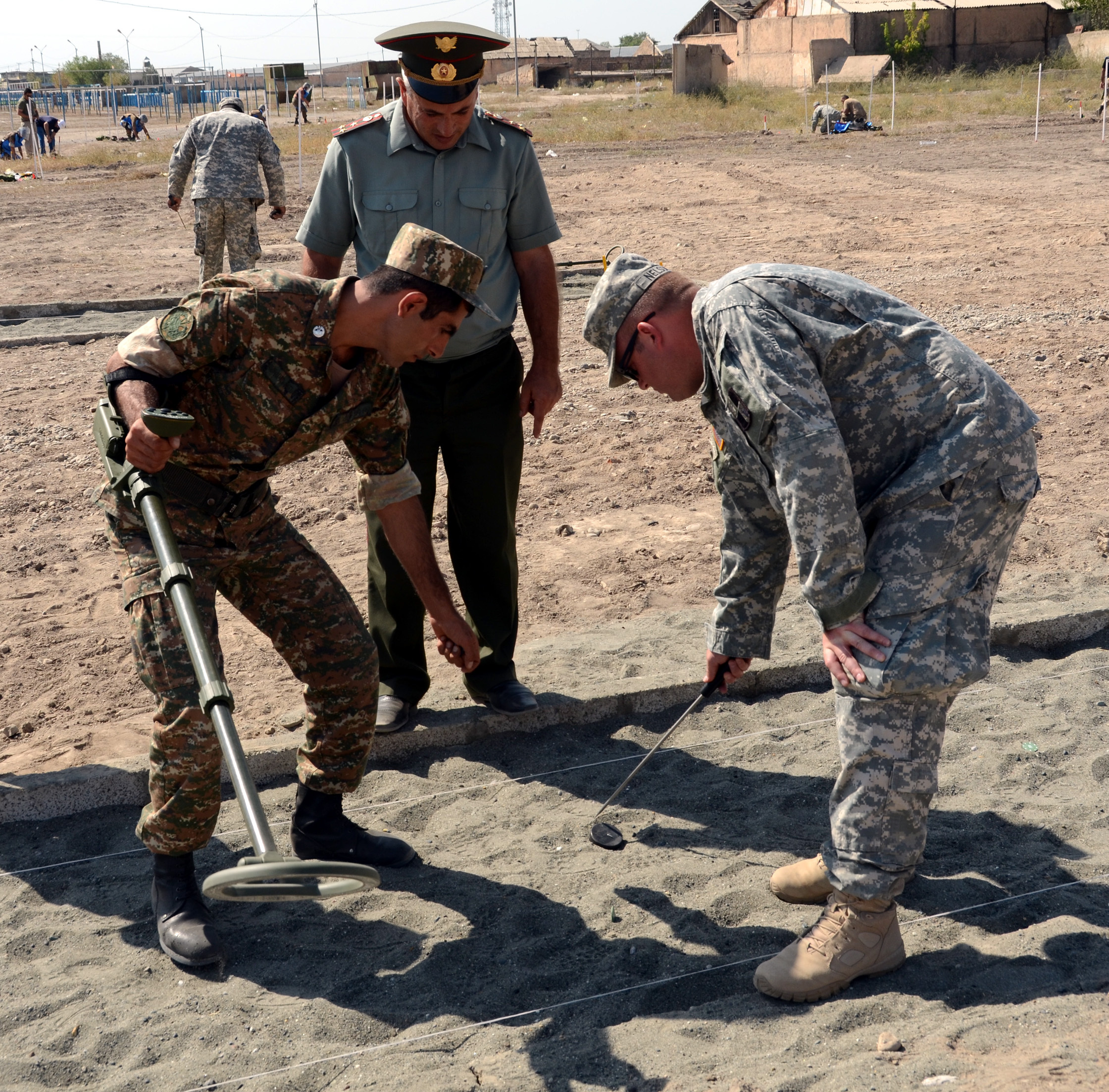
Soldiers from Kansas and Armenia train together on demining operations

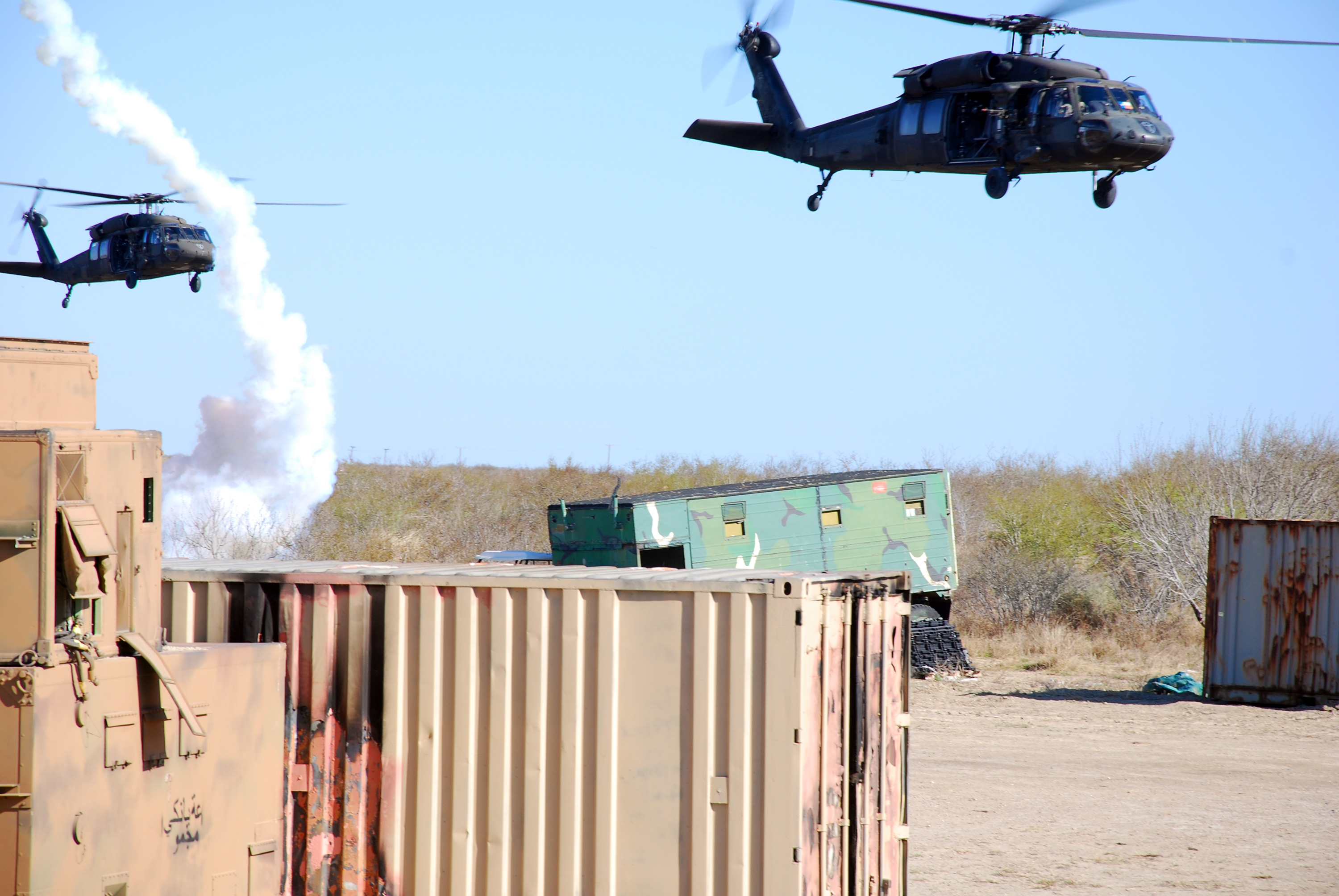
Soldiers from Texas and the Czech Republic conduct Blackhawk training exercises

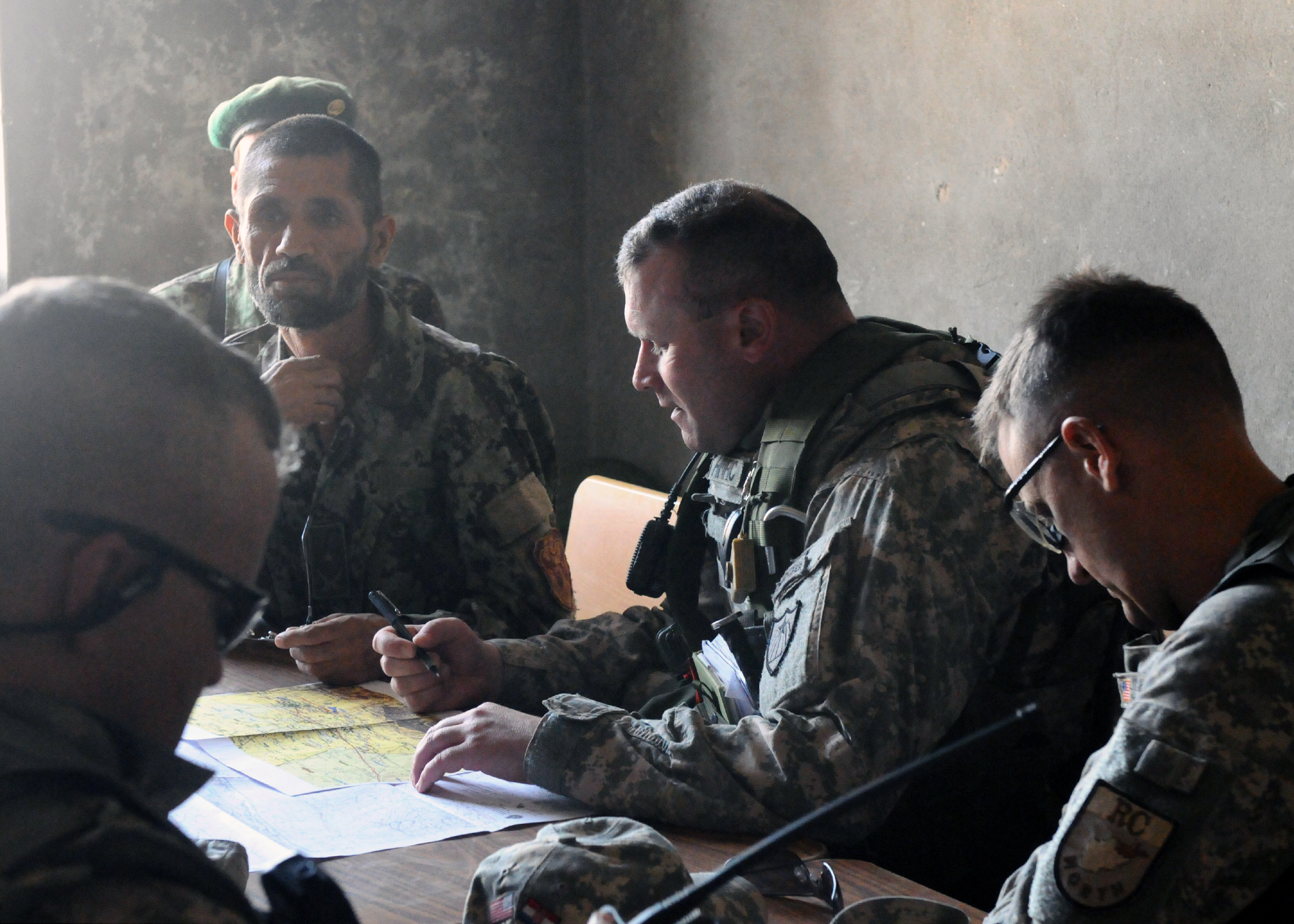
Minnesotan and Croatian troops assist in Afghan election

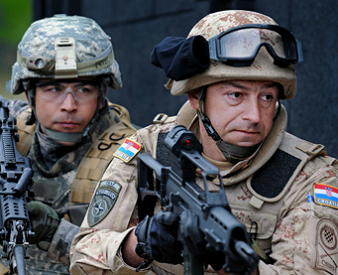
Croatian and Minnesotan soldiers prepare to clear a room together at the JMRC

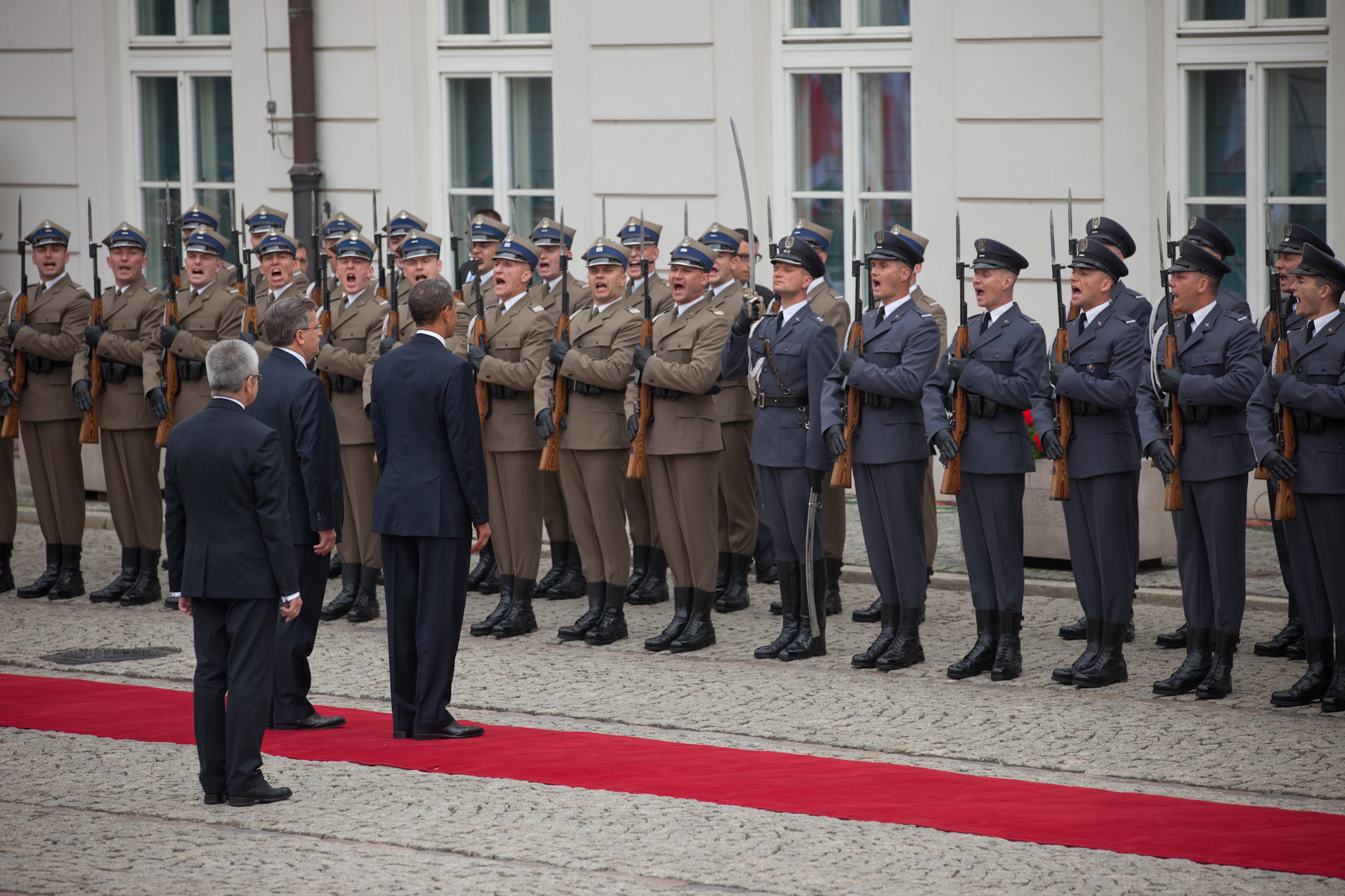
President Barack Obama reviews Polish soldiers alongside soldiers from Illinois

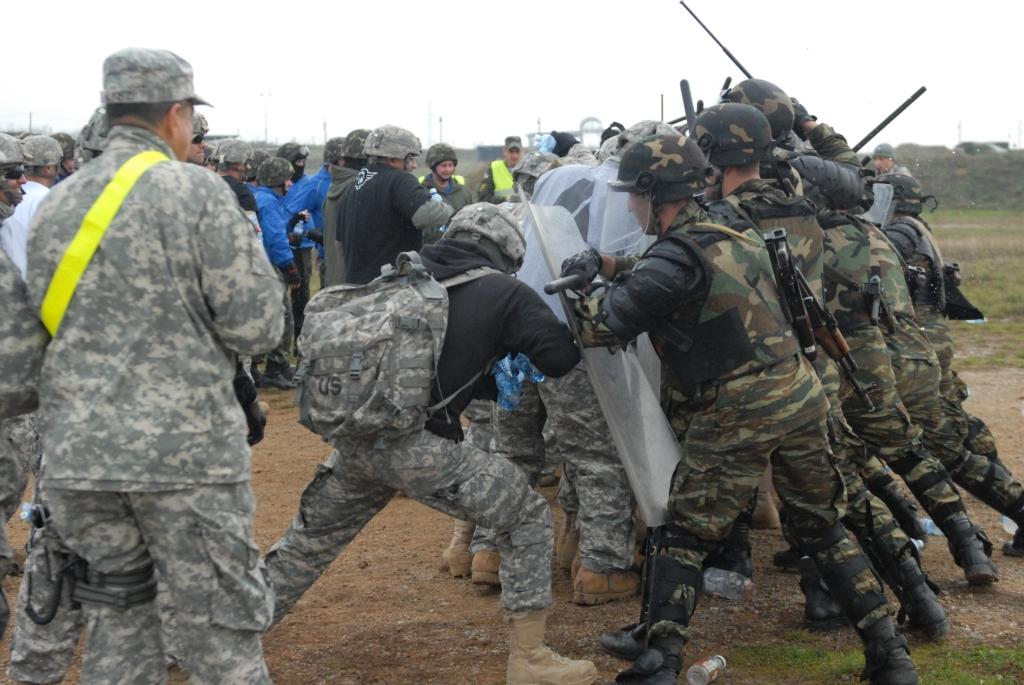
Soldiers from Kansas and Armenia practice a riot control exercise

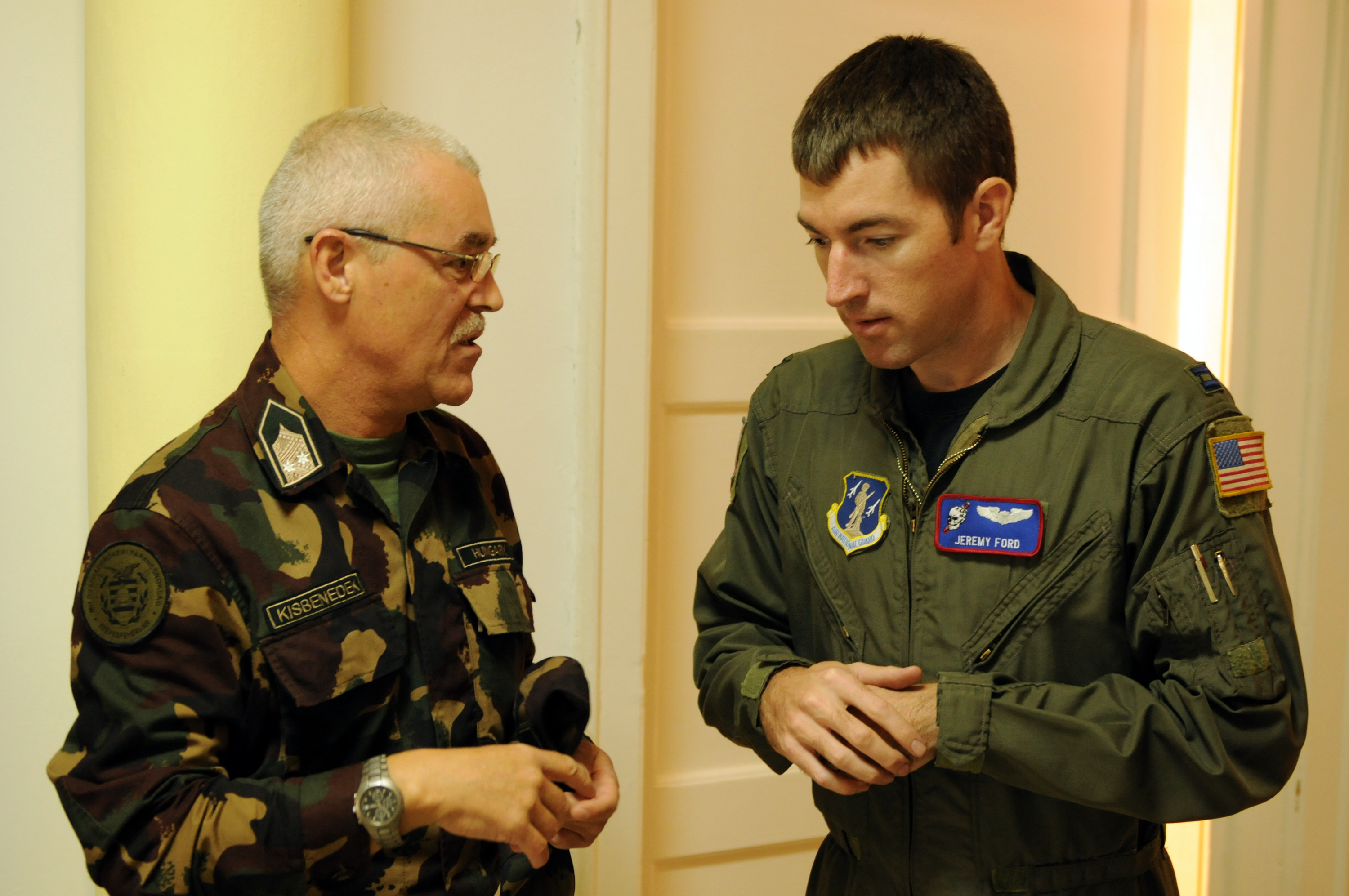
Ohio National Guard's BAO in Hungary, talks with a Hungarian counterpart

The United States European Command State Partnership Program (EUCOM SPP), according to its own mission, is a National Guard State Partnership Program that "links U.S. states with designated partner countries to ... support the command’s security cooperation objectives." Currently, 22 Partnerships exist "with former Soviet, Yugoslav and Warsaw Pact countries in the EUCOM Area of Responsibility." Becoming independent on the dissolution of the Soviet Union on December 26, 1991, these countries shortly requested the advice and assistance of the United States in creating new self-defense forces.

They had been acquired by the Soviet Union from the European Theatre of World War II. The requests began among the Baltic states, notably Latvia, which had approached NATO. It sent a delegation from five member countries, including the U.S., which chose the National Guard Bureau (NGB) as most appropriate spokesman, considering that Latvia could not afford a standing army. EUCOM thus became the first of the six geographic Combatant Commands that make up the "global SPP," and the NG, which is divided into state-sized contingents, became the host of each state-sized new national force, typically, but not necessarily, one-to-one, totally voluntarily. A country member must begin by requesting membership. The very first Partnership Program was with Latvia.

== Concept of security cooperation ==
Attempting to put a name on the theme of the partnership, the United States Department of Defense (DoD) arrived at "security cooperation," a phrase of the specialized vocabulary of the DoD and seen as its a strategic goal. However, to a large degree it means whatever the DoD defines it to mean for specific applications. In the case of EUCOM, by linking U.S. States with designated partner countries, the SPP stated aim is to promote access, enhance military capabilities, improve interoperability and enhance the principles of responsible governance. Furthermore, the SPP aims to support several areas of potential interest to the US Congress, such as:

- helping prevent failed states and creating stable regions
- improving the capabilities of partner nations to protect their citizens
- strengthening relationships to facilitate access and interoperability
- improving cultural awareness and skills among U.S. military personnel
- fostering the integration of reserve and active component forces into a "total force"

All EUCOM SPP activities are coordinated through the U.S. Ambassadors' country teams, the partner State, and other agencies as appropriate, to ensure that National Guard support is tailored to meet both U.S. and country objectives. Specifically, all activities must support the EUCOM Theater Campaign Plan (TCP) as well as individual U.S. Ambassador mission plans in the countries where they operate. The unique civil-military nature of the National Guard allows active participation in a wide range of security cooperation activities, such as:

- emergency management and disaster response
- border and port security
- leadership and NCO development
- medical capacities
- economic security
- natural resource protection
- peacekeeping operations
- counter trafficking
- counter proliferation
- counter terrorism

== History ==
With the dissolution of the Soviet Union in December 1991, an opportunity emerged for bilateral relations with the 15 former Soviet Republics. Such relations were necessary to maintain regional stability and to ensure the development of civilian-controlled militaries.

The SPP evolved from the 1991 U.S. European Command decision to set up a Joint Contact Team Program in the Baltic Region with Reserve component Soldiers and Airmen. A subsequent National Guard Bureau proposal paired U.S. states with three nations emerging from the former Soviet Bloc (Latvia, Lithuania, and Estonia) and the SPP was born, becoming a key U.S. security cooperation tool, facilitating cooperation across all aspects of international civil-military affairs and encouraging people-to-people ties at the state level.

Sparking the program was a request from the Latvian government for help in developing a military based on the National Guard’s citizen-soldier model. Army Gen. Colin Powell, chairman of the Joint Chiefs at the time and Army Gen. John Shalikashvili, then EUCOM commander, embraced the concept as a way to build partnerships with non-NATO countries in the region as they established democratic governments and market economies.

The United States European Command (USEUCOM) took the lead in this effort by establishing the Joint Contact Team Program (JCTP) in 1992. The JCTP was originally composed of active component personnel and included members of the special forces because of their language skills. However, when the JCTP began to engage the Baltic nations of Latvia, Estonia, and Lithuania, senior defense officials insisted that National Guard and Reserve personnel play a leading role in any military liaison teams operating in those countries, apparently in response to those governments’ desire to establish reserve-centric defense establishments and to assuage Russian concerns about U.S. expansion into its former satellites. “The U.S. was trying to engage with the former communist nations that were in the Warsaw Pact, and using active duty troops might have been a little too offensive to the Russians or the folks that were in there, so the idea was to use the small footprint of National Guard troops,” said Air Force Col. Joey Booher, Chief of International Affairs for the National Guard Bureau.

In November 1992, Lieutenant General John B. Conaway, the Chief of the National Guard Bureau, and Brigadier General Thomas Lennon, head of the JCTP, visited the Baltics. A few months after their trip, in early 1993, the National Guard initiated the first state partnerships: Maryland-Estonia, Michigan-Latvia, and Pennsylvania-Lithuania. Additional partnerships were proposed later in 1993 for Albania, Belarus, Bulgaria, the Czech Republic, Hungary, Kazakhstan, Romania, Poland, Slovakia, Slovenia, and Ukraine. The SPP assisted the JCTP by providing additional personnel, funding, and access to military personnel from U.S. ethnic-heritage communities who often had relevant language and cultural skills.

Today, 21 U.S. states are partnered with 22 European countries. Two bilateral relationships also exist between National Guard Bureau and Israel as well as between Minnesota and Norway.

== Current partnerships ==
The EUCOM State Partnership Program consists of 25 State/Country partnerships. The following is a list of each partnership with the year they were formed in parentheses.

- Alabama / Romania (1993)
- California / Ukraine (1993)
- Colorado / Slovenia (1993)
- Georgia / Georgia (1994)
- Illinois / Poland (1993)
- Indiana / Slovakia (1994)
- Iowa / Kosovo (2011)
- Kansas / Armenia (2003)
- Maine / Montenegro (2006)
- Maryland / Estonia (1993)
- Maryland / Bosnia and Herzegovina (2003)
- Michigan / Latvia (1993)
- Minnesota / Croatia (1996)
- Minnesota / Norway (2023)
- New Jersey / Albania (2001)
- New Jersey / Cyprus (2022)
- North Carolina / Moldova (1996)
- Ohio / Hungary (1993)
- Ohio / Serbia (2006)
- Oklahoma / Azerbaijan (2003)
- Pennsylvania / Lithuania (1993)
- Tennessee / Bulgaria (1993)
- Texas, Nebraska / Czech Republic (1993)
- Vermont / North Macedonia (1993)
- Vermont / Austria (2021)

== Claimed benefits of the SPP ==
In a U.S. Government Accountability Office Report to Congressional Committees published in May 2012, State Partnership Program stakeholders, including State Partnership Program Coordinators, Bilateral Affairs Officers, and Combatant Command officials, cited benefits of the program as follows:

State Partnership Program Coordinators
Bilateral Affairs Officers
Officials from combatant commands

- Provides experience and training for Guardsmen
- Develops relationship with partner country
- Encourages partners to co-deploy to Iraq or Afghanistan
- Improves retention or provides other incentives for Guardsmen
- Guardsmen benefit from partner country’s experiences
- Events are tied to COCOM or country team mission
- Good communication and coordination between stakeholders
- Provides information sharing and support to partner country
- Builds relationship with partner country
- Encourages partners to co-deploy to Iraq or Afghanistan
- Events support combatant command mission and objectives
- NG units possess unique skills in support of COCOM objectives
- Encourages partner nation deployment to Iraq or Afghanistan

In addition to the above, EUCOM claims the following additional benefits:

- Due to fiscal and security challenges, the U.S. and Allied nations must develop strong partnerships built on trust and longevity. The value of the SPP is its ability to focus the attention of a small part of the Department of Defense – a State National Guard – with a single country in support of U.S. policies.
- In FY 2011, EUCOM conducted 287 SPP events, nearly a quarter of the 1209 total EUCOM events, at a cost of $3.8M. SPP is the largest non-EUCOM force provider for events in the AOR.
- As permanently based U.S. forces draw down in Europe, partnerships increase in their importance to the security of the U.S., the European continent and its neighbors.
- The National Guard is uniquely suited to maintain continuity and foster close, continuing relationships because Guard members generally remain in one state through their career. This continuity of the relationships builds enduring faith and confidence.
- Partnerships have proven critical for building and maintaining international coalitions for overseas contingency operations. SPP relationships have played a significant role in partner nations joining and remaining with the coalitions in Iraq and Afghanistan. From 2008 to the end of 2014, as many as 19 SPP nations participated in International Security Assistance Force (ISAF) co-deployments with their National Guard partner states. Made non-operational in December, 2014, the ISAF was a mission in Afghanistan, established by the United Nations Security Council in December 2001 by Resolution 1386. Its main purpose was to train the Afghan National Security Forces (ANSF) and assist Afghanistan in rebuilding key government institutions. By 2013 some 87,000 troops were participating, 60,000 from the United States, 7700 from the United Kingdom, 4400 from Germany, about 3000 from Italy, and up to 1200 each from the other participants, typically much less. ISAF was not an SPP program, but the SPP was encouraged to participate. When the crisis was over, ISAF was immediately replaced by the Resolute Support Mission (RSM), a NATO mission adopted by the United Nations Security Council. It would continue to insure the government of Afghanistan at the diminished level of 13,500 troops. Most of the Americans and British went home, but about 7000 U. S. troops remained, and all 19 of the SPP partners, about 2700 persons.
- As EUCOM seeks to grow "whole of community" partnerships, the SPP fosters this effort. As a community-based organization, the National Guard and its citizen-soldiers have experience in combining the efforts of government entities, academics, NGOs, and private companies to foster regional growth and stability.
- By leveraging SPP relationships, EUCOM contributed to the accession of 12 Central and East European countries into NATO.

== Steps to new partnerships ==
1. Nation requests participation through U.S. Ambassador
2. U.S. Ambassador endorses request to the Combatant Commander
3. EUCOM ensures partnership request fits U.S. goals and strategy, as well as availability of funds
4. Combatant Commander requests state nomination from Chief of the National Guard Bureau (NGB)
5. Chief, NGB, nominates the State to Combatant Commander
6. Combatant Commander endorses nomination with memos to U.S. Ambassador and Chief, NGB
7. Partnership interaction begins

== Statutory authority ==
The SPP has no dedicated statutory authority; rather, SPP activities are currently carried out under one or more Title 10 (Armed Forces), Title 32 (National Guard) and National Defense Authorization Act authorities that are related to the types of missions conducted. The main authorities that may be used by SPP are:

- 10 U.S.C. 168 (Military-to-military contacts and comparable activities) This provision provides authority for the Secretary of Defense to fund military-to-military contacts “that are designed to encourage a democratic orientation of defense establishments and military forces of other countries.”
- 10 U.S.C. 1051 (Bilateral or Regional Cooperation Programs). This provision authorizes the Secretary of Defense to pay the travel, subsistence, and similar personal expenses of defense personnel of developing countries in connection with their attendance at a bilateral or regional conference, seminar, or similar meeting, with certain restrictions.
- 10 U.S.C. 1050 (Latin American Cooperation). Section 1050 is similar to Section 1051, but specifically applies to the travel, subsistence, and special compensation of officers and students of Latin American countries and other expenses that the Secretary considers necessary for Latin American cooperation.
- 10 USC 1050a (African Cooperation). Section 1050a is nearly identical to Section 1050, except that it applies to officers and students of African nations.
- 10 U.S.C. 2010 (Combined Exercises). This provision authorizes the Secretary of Defense, after consultation with the Secretary of State, to pay incremental expenses incurred by a developing country as a direct result of participation in bilateral or multilateral military exercises.
- 10 U.S.C. 401 (Humanitarian and Civic Assistance). This provision authorizes DOD to carry out humanitarian and civic assistance activities in host nations in conjunction with military operations, if the activities promote the security interests of both nations and benefit the operational readiness skills of participating armed forces personnel.
- 10 U.S.C. 2561 (Humanitarian Assistance). This provision authorizes the expenditure of humanitarian assistance funds for the transportation of humanitarian relief and other humanitarian purposes.
- 10 U.S.C. 2249c (Regional Defense Combating Terrorism Fellowship Program (CTFP), which authorizes the use of funds to pay the costs associated with the attendance of foreign military officers, ministry of defense officials, or security officials at U.S. military educational institutions, regional centers, conferences, seminars, and at civilian venues, or other training programs conducted under the CTFP.
- National Defense Authorization Act, Section 1206 – funding authority for events related to Building Partnership Capacity.
- Cooperative Threat Reduction Program – funding related to preventing weapons proliferation and other activities.

For SPP events conducted overseas, National Guard members are placed in a duty status by orders issued under the authority of 10 U.S.C. 12301. For SPP events conducted within the United States, National Guard members are placed in a duty status by orders issued under 32 U.S.C. 502. This permits the participating members to receive appropriate military pay and benefits.

== Funding mechanisms ==
Current funding for SPP activities includes the pay and allowances for the National Guard participants, which are normally funded by the Army and Air National Guard Personnel accounts of DOD appropriations. However, those who serve overseas full-time in support of the program have their pay and allowances covered by the active component Army or Air Force Personnel account. Other significant costs for SPP are travel-related expenses, such as transportation, lodging, and meals. These expenses may be incurred by National Guard personnel or foreign military personnel participating in an SPP event. Such travel-related expenses are typically paid for out of one of the Operations and Maintenance (O&M) accounts, although some of the travel expenses for National Guard personnel may be paid out of personnel accounts. This O&M funding has historically flowed to SPP through a number of programs and activities:

- Traditional Combatant Commander’s Activities (TCA)
- National Guard Bureau’s International Affairs Division
- Combatant Commander’s Initiative Fund (CCIF)
- Warsaw Initiative Fund/Partnership for Peace (WIF/PfP)
- Combating Terrorism Fellowship Program (CFTP)
- Cooperative Threat Reduction Program (CTR)
- Asia-Pacific Regional Initiative Fund (APRI)
- Latin American Cooperation (LATAM COOP)
- Overseas Humanitarian, Disaster, and Civic Assistance (OHDCA)
- Building Partner Capacity (BPC)
- Overseas Humanitarian Assistance (OHA)

== See also ==
- State Partnership Program
