= Iowa–Kosovo National Guard Partnership =

Kosovo–United States military partnership

Iowa–Kosovo State Partnership
- Part of the U.S. European Command State Partnership Program
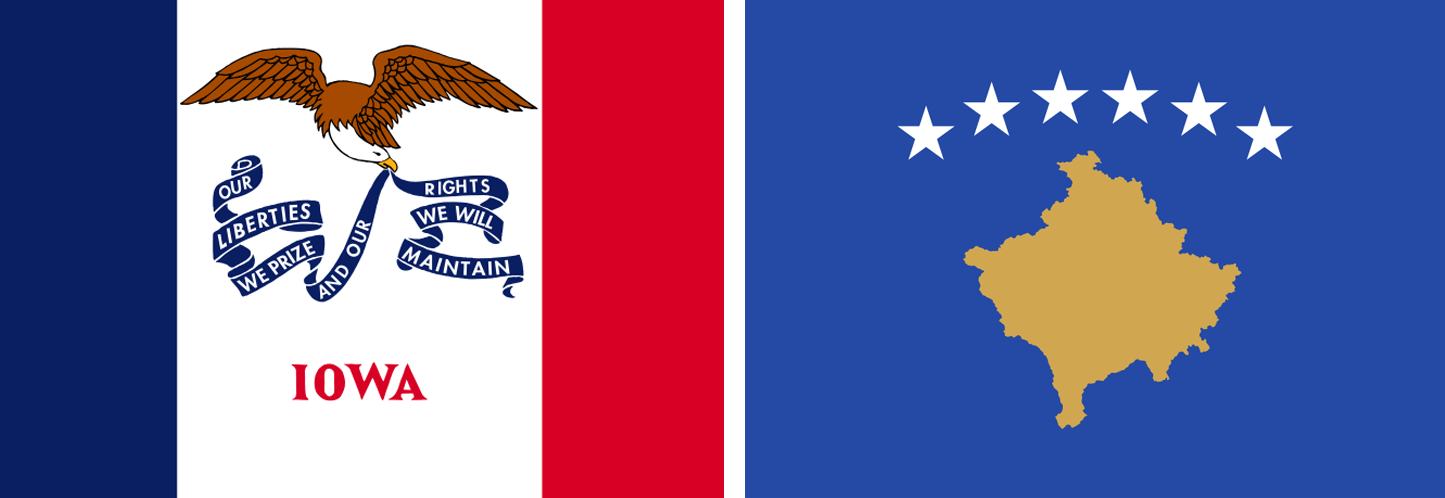
- Origin: 2011
- Country president: Vjosa Osmani
- Prime minister: Albin Kurti
- Minister of defense: Armend Mehaj
- Ambassador to U.S.: Ilir Dugolli
- Ambassador to Kosovo: Jeff Hovenier
- Adjutant general: MG Timothy Orr
- 2012 Engagements: 9
- NATO member: No
- EU member: No

The Kosovo-Iowa National Guard Partnership is one of 25 European partnerships that make-up the U.S. European Command State Partnership Program and one of 88 worldwide partnerships that make-up the National Guard State Partnership Program. The partnership was created on March 11, 2011 with the long-term goal of developing the Kosovo Security Force (KSF) and fostering mutually-beneficial interests across all levels of society. Establishing a strong relationship with the government of Kosovo, this partnership represents a critical step toward the reform development of Kosovo's security forces along Euro-Atlantic standards. The relationship lead to a sister state agreement.

== History ==
Kosovo

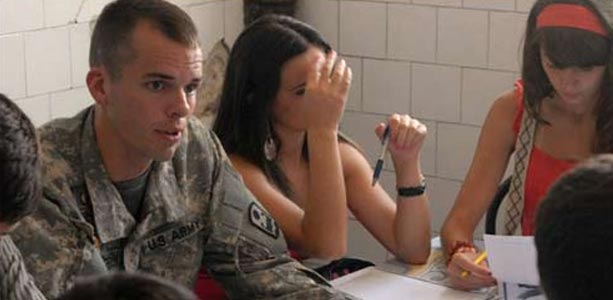
A Soldier with the Iowa National Guard helps students at a Youth Center in Kosovo prepare for an English language test.

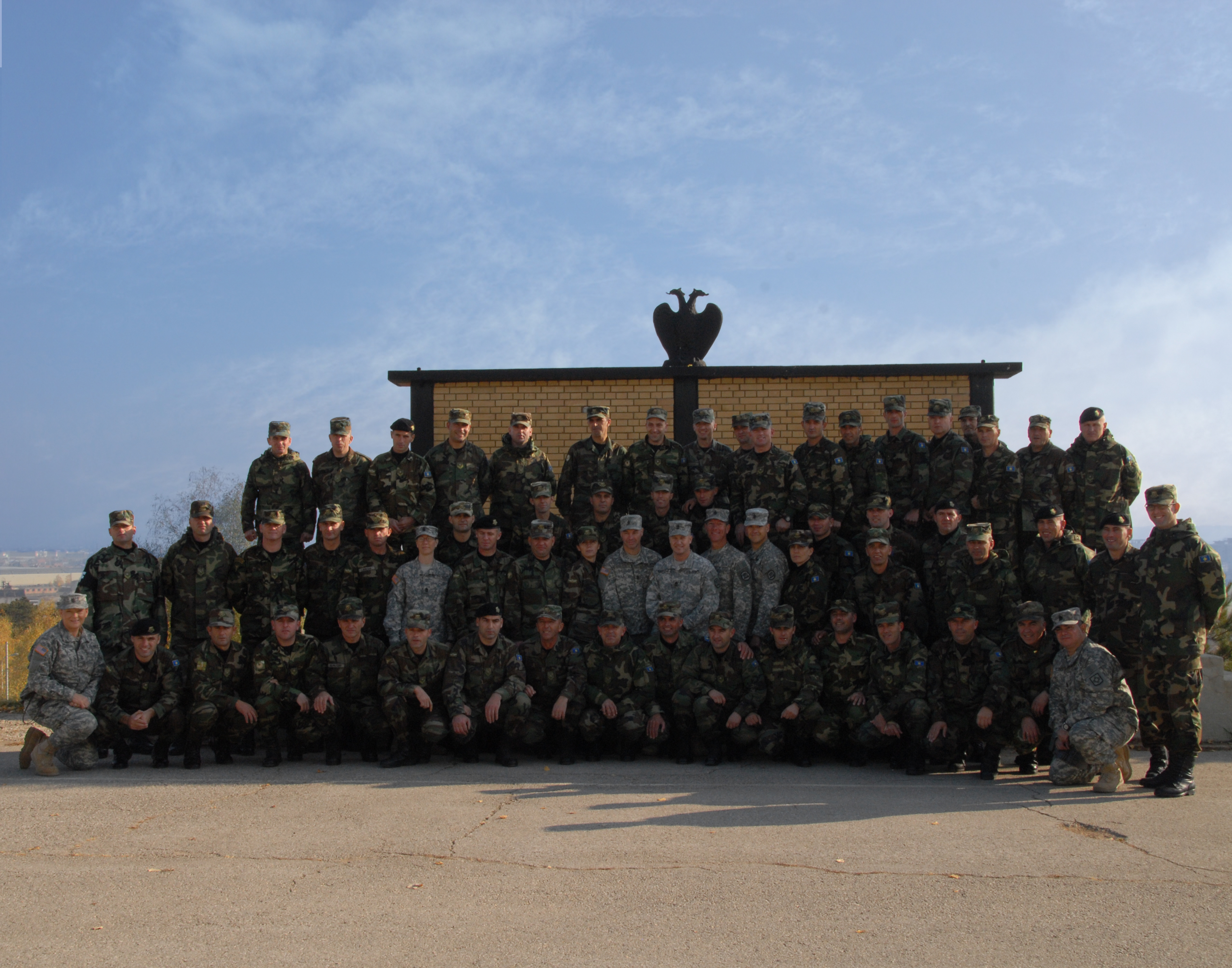
The initial Senior Non-commissioned Officer course for the Kosovo Security Forces taught by their state partner Iowa National Guard.

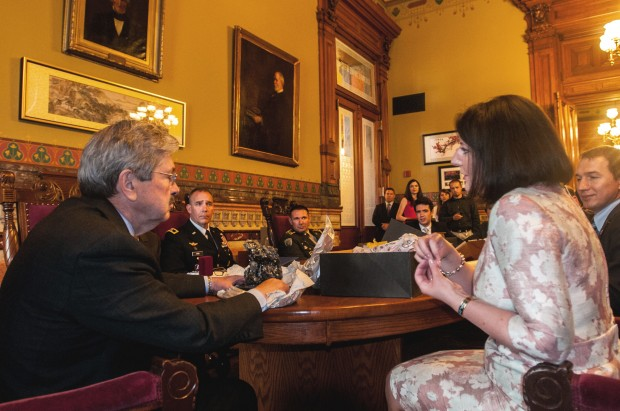
The President of Kosovo (right), presents the Governor of Iowa (left) with a gift during her first visit to Iowa

Kosovo declared its independence from Serbia on Feb. 17, 2008. In its declaration of independence, Kosovo committed to fulfilling its obligations under the plan established by UN Special Envoy Martti Ahtisaari, as a fundamental principle of good governance and to welcome a period of international supervision. United States recognition was immediate and just three years later, Iowa Governor Terry Branstad announced the newly established partnership between the State of Iowa and the Republic of Kosovo. "I am delighted to announce the establishment of a State Partnership Program with the Republic of Kosovo, a great friend to the United States and a place with which our Guardsmen and women are already familiar through service in NATO's Kosovo force," Branstad said. "The State Partnership Program is a longstanding and important program, which will benefit both our Iowa National Guard and the Kosovo Security Force."

Iowa has a special relationship with Kosovo as more than 700 Iowa National Guardsmen and women have been stationed there as part of peacekeeping missions since 2003. Additionally, the Iowa National Guard's public affairs office states that it has been the tradition of Iowa soldiers serving in Kosovo to also engage in nation-building activities on their personal time, such as teaching students English and helping with other types of community betterment projects.

The first major partnership event between Iowa and Kosovo involved the Iowa National Guard's Regional Training Institute spending more than two weeks in Kosovo teaching the first Kosovo Security Force Senior Noncommissioned Officer Course. "This course was in development when the NCO leadership of Iowa visited Kosovo in September," Army CSM Rachel Fails said. "So, it did a couple things for us besides give us, the state partner, information and knowledge of the KSF. It really is the first step in building that relationship – a personal relationship that three years, four years, five years from now we're still going to be here and we're going to keep building here."

In fiscal year 2012, Iowa and Kosovo participated in 9 different SPP events, including a KSF Medical Readiness event, a KSF SR NCO Refresher Course, KSF visit to Iowa, and a Senior Leader Visit to Kosovo.

In September 2012, a particularly important step in furthering the already strong relationship was taken when Iowa sent a military service member to work full-time in Kosovo to help coordinate projects between the two countries.

== See also ==
- Iowa National Guard
- Kosovo Security Force
