= Ohio–Hungary National Guard Partnership =

Ohio–Hungary State Partnership
- Part of the U.S. European Command State Partnership Program
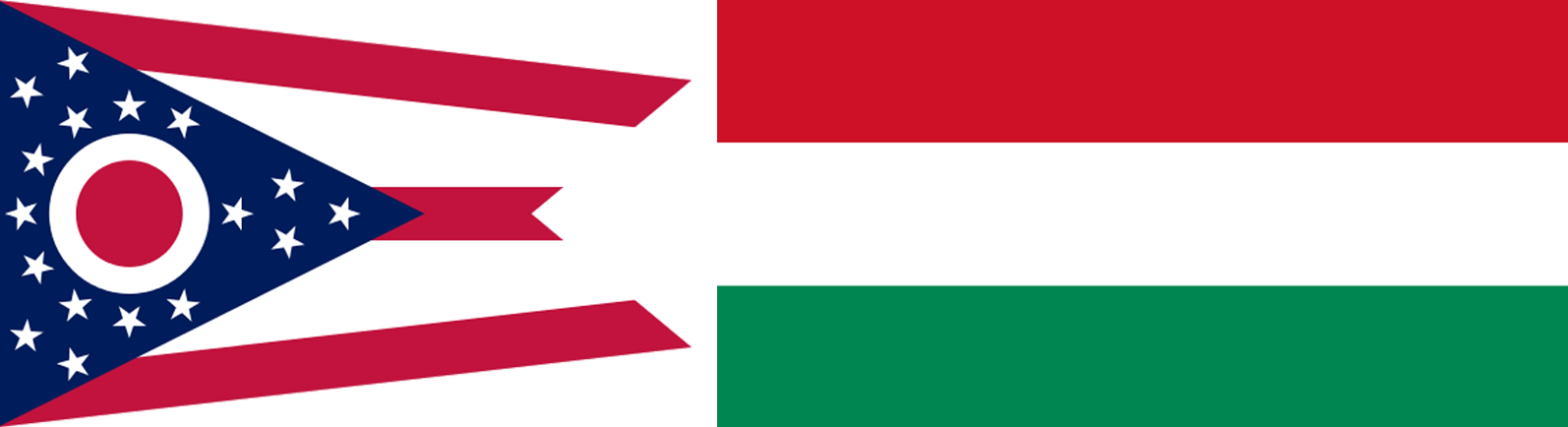
- Origin: 1993
- Country president: András Baka
- Prime minister: Péter Magyar
- Minister of defense: Romulusz Ruszin-Szendi
- Ambassador to U.S.: Vacant
- Ambassador to Hungary: Caroline Savage; Chargé d'Affaires ad interim
- State Governor: Mike DeWine
- Adjutant general: BG Matthew S. Woodruff
- 2012 Engagements: 7
- NATO member: Yes (1999)
- EU member: Yes (2004)

Hungary

The Ohio–Hungary National Guard Partnership is one of 25 European partnerships that make-up the U.S. European Command State Partnership Program and one of 88 worldwide partnerships that make up the National Guard State Partnership Program. The country of Hungary signed a bilateral affairs agreement with the U.S. Department of Defense and the state of Ohio in 1993 establishing the Ohio-Hungary State Partnership program. There is a large population of Hungarians throughout Ohio, especially in Columbus, Cleveland, Dayton and Toledo. Since then, Ohio and Hungary have conducted over 150 SPP events in a host of security cooperation activities ranging from bilateral familiarizations, small unit exchanges, exercises, senior military and civic leader visits to deployments of Operational Mentoring and Liaison Teams (OMLT) in support of Operation Enduring Freedom.

The state partners actively participate in a host of security cooperation activities ranging from bilateral familiarization and training-like events, to exercises, fellowship-style internships and civic leader visits. All activities are coordinated through the Theater Combatant Commanders, the US Ambassadors' country teams and other agencies as appropriate, to ensure that National Guard support is tailored to meet both U.S. and country objectives.

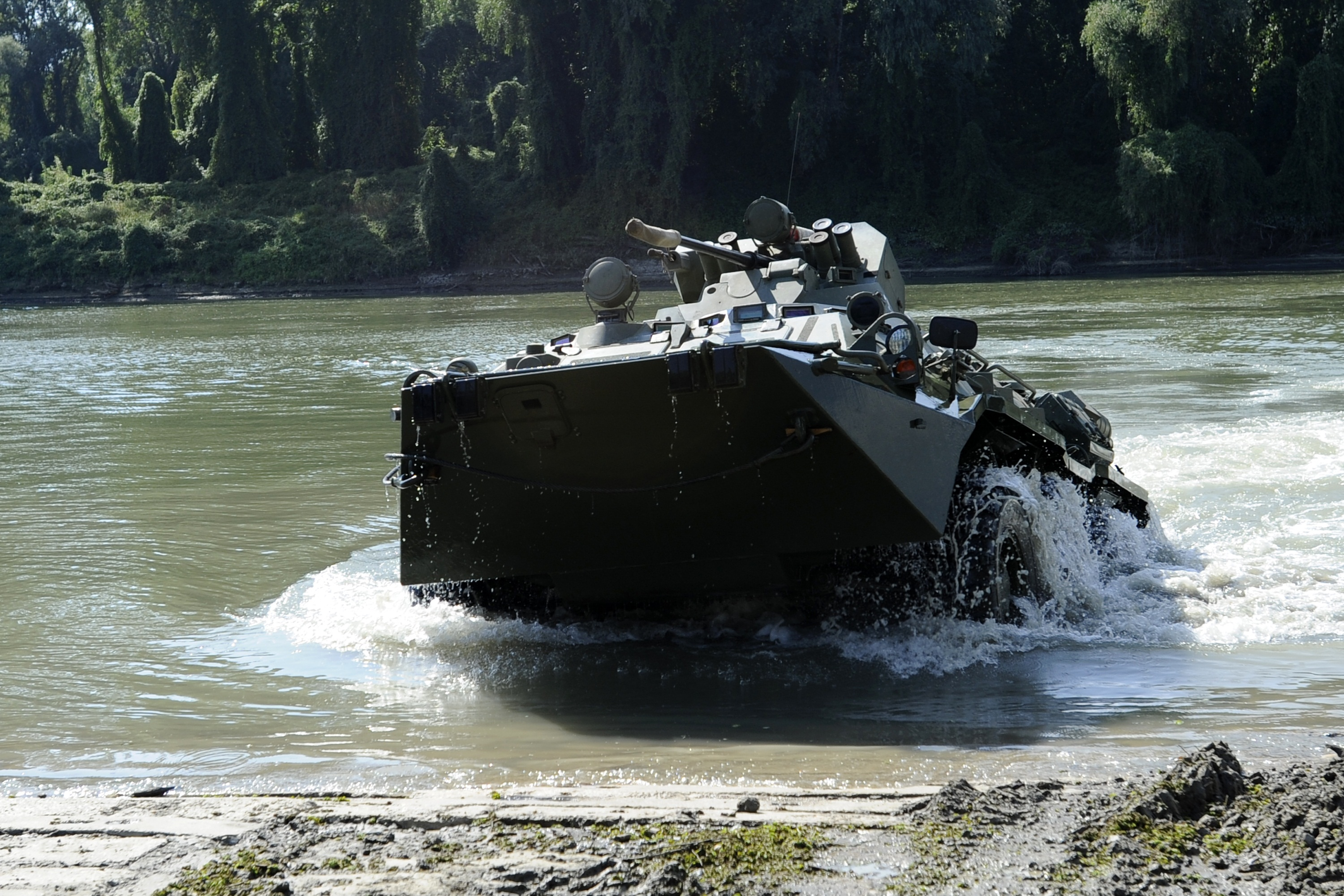
Soldiers from Hungary and Ohio conduct amphibious landing training in Hungary.

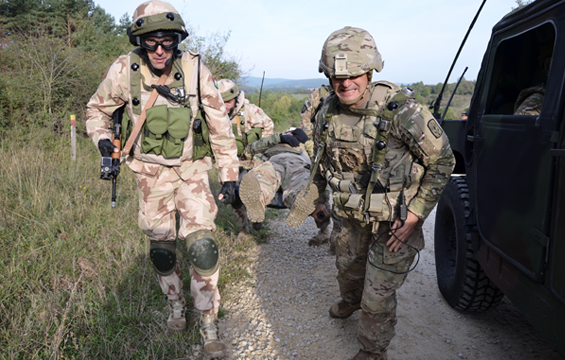
Soldiers from Hungary and Ohio carry a litter during a training exercise at the Joint Multinational Readiness Center in Germany in 2012.

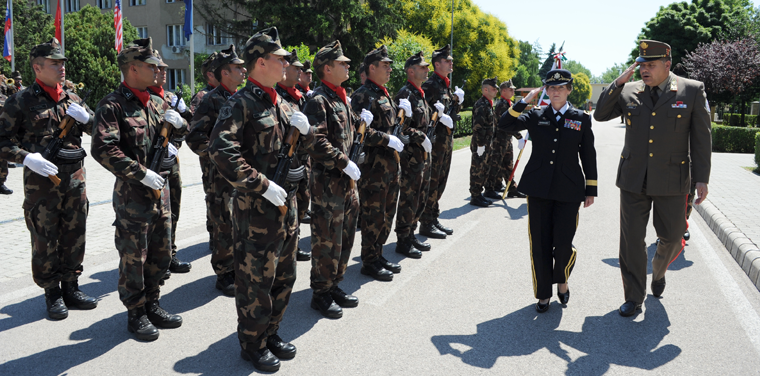
Major General Deborah A. Ashenhurst, Adjutant General of Ohio, participates in a review of troops ceremony during a visit to Hungary.

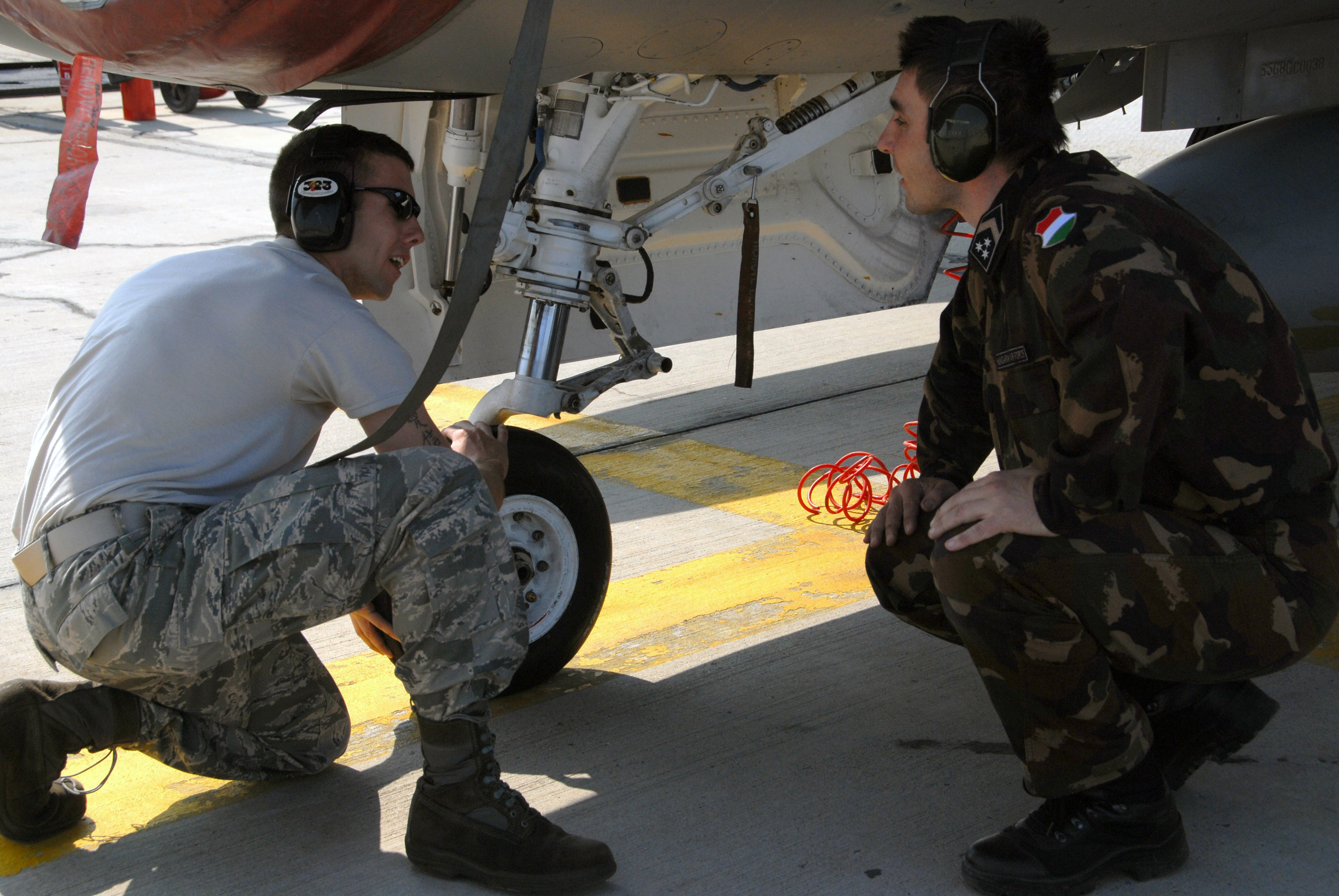
A crew chief in the Ohio Air National Guard shows a Hungarian air force aircraft maintainer the nose landing gear on an F-16 Fighting Falcon during an exercise in Hungary.

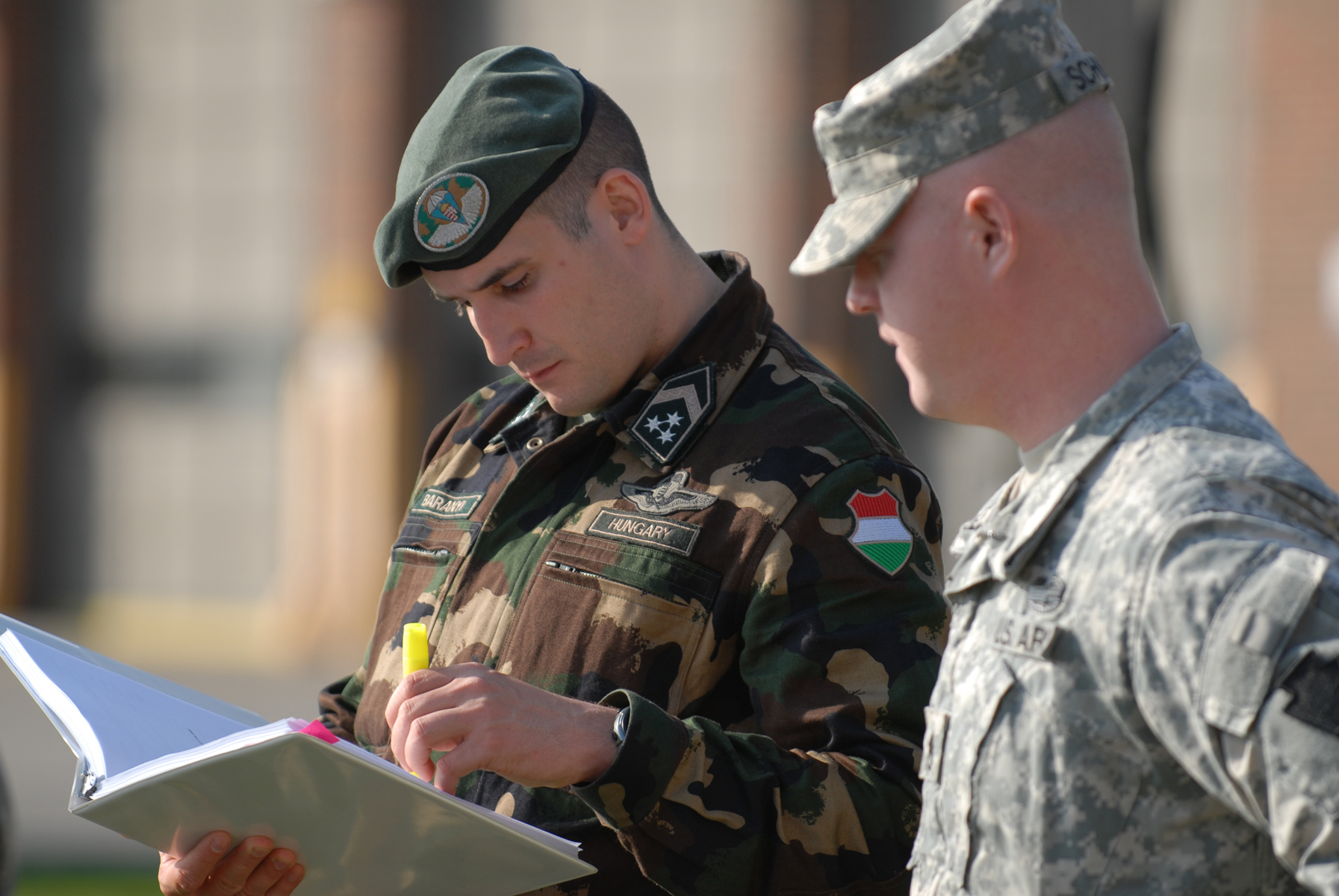
A Hungarian soldier and his Ohio Army National Guard sponsor study convoy operations April 25 while attending BNCOC at the state's Regional Training Institute.

== History ==
"Ultimately, the State Partnership Program is about personal relationships. It is a partnership that involves an ongoing dialog about the day-to-day challenges we both face and our willingness to think outside the box in finding solutions." – MG Greg Wayt, former Adjutant General, Ohio National Guard

Overview:

- NATO accession on 12 March 1999
- EU accession on 1 May 2004
- A contributor to ISAF with over 500 troops deployed
- A 20-year partnership that is an example for success
- Joint Terminal Air Controllers (JTAC) accredited by US/NATO

As the Soviet Union disintegrated between 1989 and 1991, Hungary conducted their first free parliamentary election in May 1990. During this period U.S. government officials explored options to minimize instability and encourage democratic governments in the former Soviet bloc nations, thus creating one of the initial pairings of a state with a nation. This provided a unique partnership, capacity-building capability to the combatant commanders and the U.S. Ambassador to Hungary. In doing so Ohio supports the United States national interests and security cooperation goals by engaging with Hungary via military, socio-political and economic conduits at the local, state and national levels.

One of the key measurements of success for this partnership is the progress that was accomplished beyond events that only demonstrated basic capabilities and equipment. One of the original goals that Ohio has accomplished was the establishment of a genuine, ongoing, personal relationship(s) that developed between Ohio National Guard units and individual soldiers/airman. This has promoted and fostered the exchange of ideas and experiences which has assisted Hungary in accomplishing:

Events in 2012 included a TAG Visit, a Recruiting and Recruiting Seminar, Consequence Management, Disaster Response/Crisis Management Planning, Medical Support to Deployed Forces, Helicopter Air Support Operations, and a Logistics Information Exchange.

== Partnership focus ==
Ohio and Hungary intend to capitalize on their decades-long relationship while continuing engagements that will assist Hungary's support to NATO commitments and a partner in global engagements.

The following are EUCOM stated areas of focus for Ohio-Hungary partnership:

- Build partnerships to enhance security
- Strengthen NATO and assist alliance transformation
- Support ISAF Deployments
- Modern and interoperable and deployable forces
- Special Forces capabilities
- Create equal partnership in a NATO or UN cyber environment

The following are FY2013 Proposed Events

- Military Engineers Tri-Lateral Engagement with Ohio/Hungary/Serbia
- OMLT/MAT Lessons Learned
- Senior Leader Engagement
- Vehicle Maintenance Transformation
- Consequence Management MPC
- Cyber Defense – Staff Assistance Visit (SAV)
- Airfield Security
- Creating a regional exercise for JTAC
