= Colorado–Slovenia National Guard Partnership =

Colorado–Slovenia State Partnership
- Part of the U.S. European Command State Partnership Program
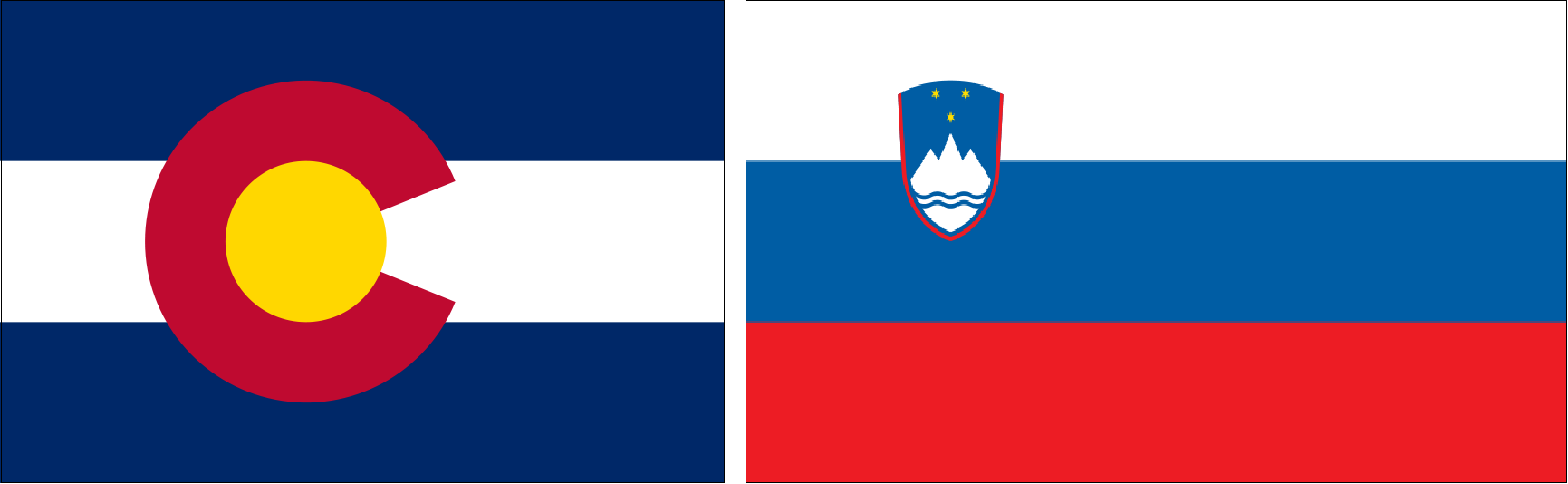
- Origin: 1993
- Country president: Nataša Pirc Musar
- Prime minister: Robert Golob
- Minister of defense: Borut Sajovic
- Ambassador to U.S.: H.E. Iztok Mirošič
- Ambassador to Slovenia: Vacant
- Honorary Consul to Colorado: Tamara Gorenc
- Adjutant General of Colorado: Maj. Gen. Robert Davis
- 2014 Engagements: 6
- NATO member: Yes (2004)
- EU member: Yes (2004)

Slovenia

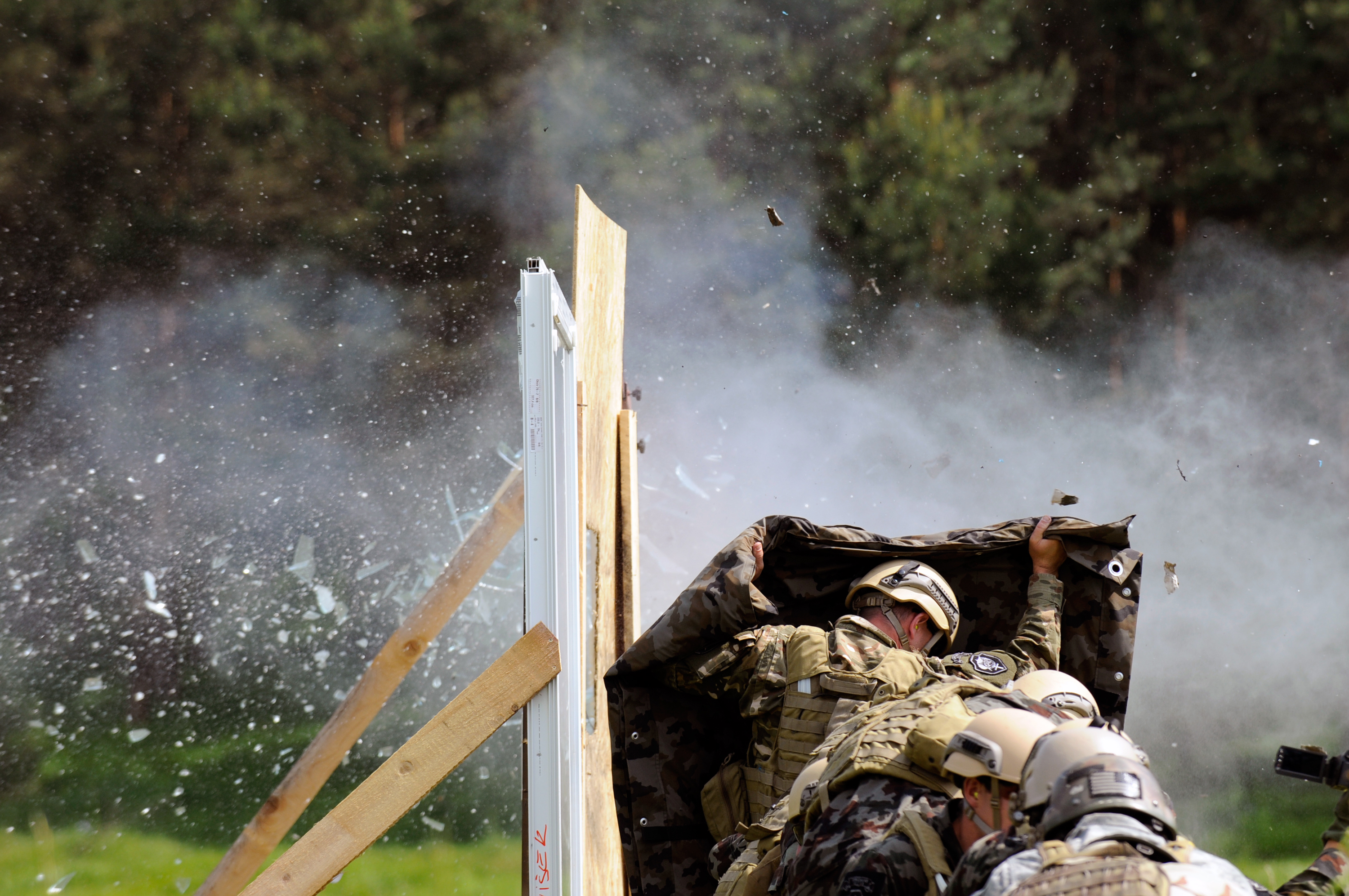
Soldiers from Slovenian Army Special Operations and the Colorado Army National Guard's 5th Battalion, 19th Special Forces Group (Airborne), practice explosive breaching techniques during a three-week Joint Combined Exchange Training exercise in Slovenia

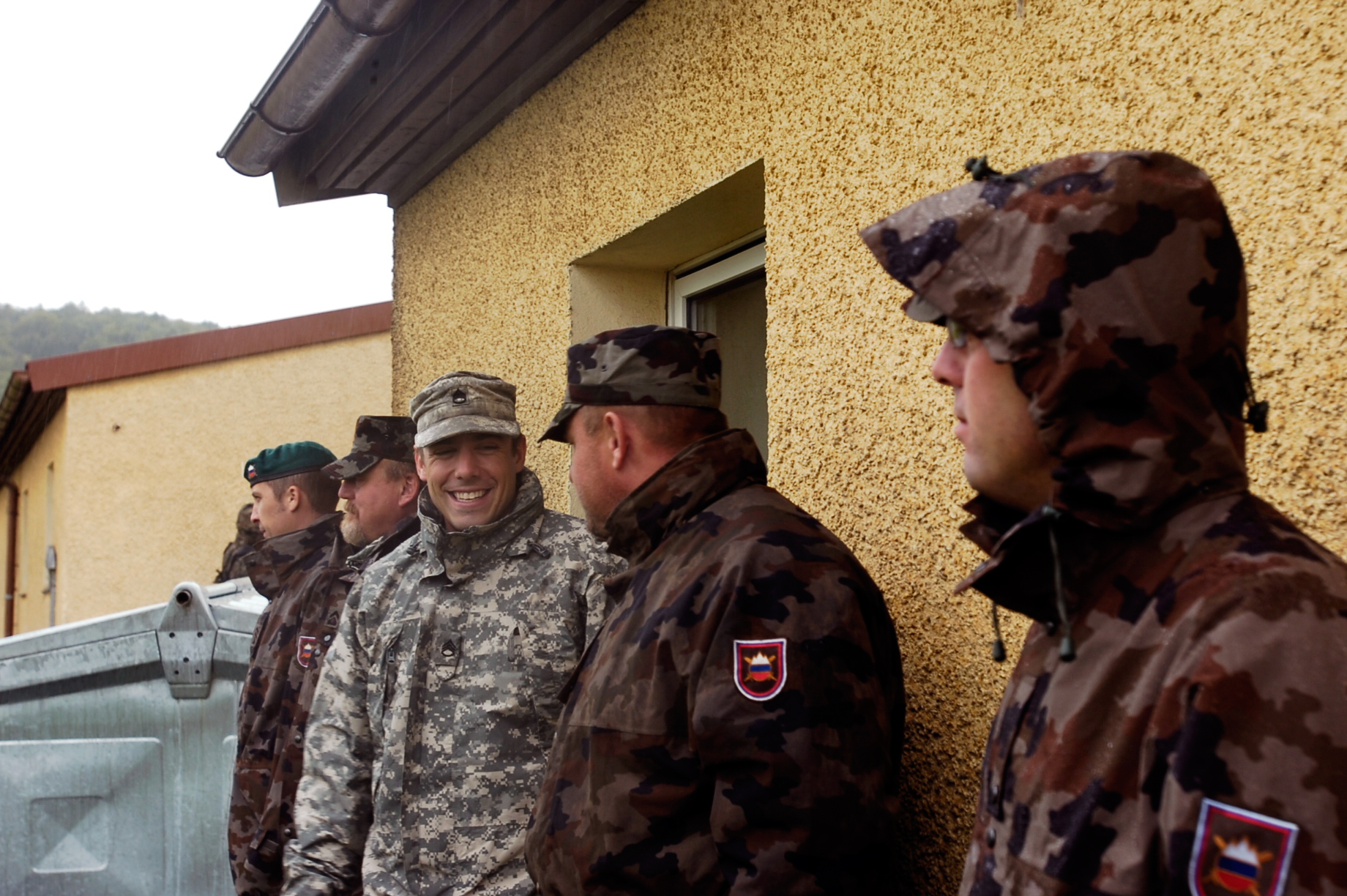
US Army soldiers wait for formation with Slovenian soldiers they've been training with at U.S. Army Garrison Hohenfels in Germany

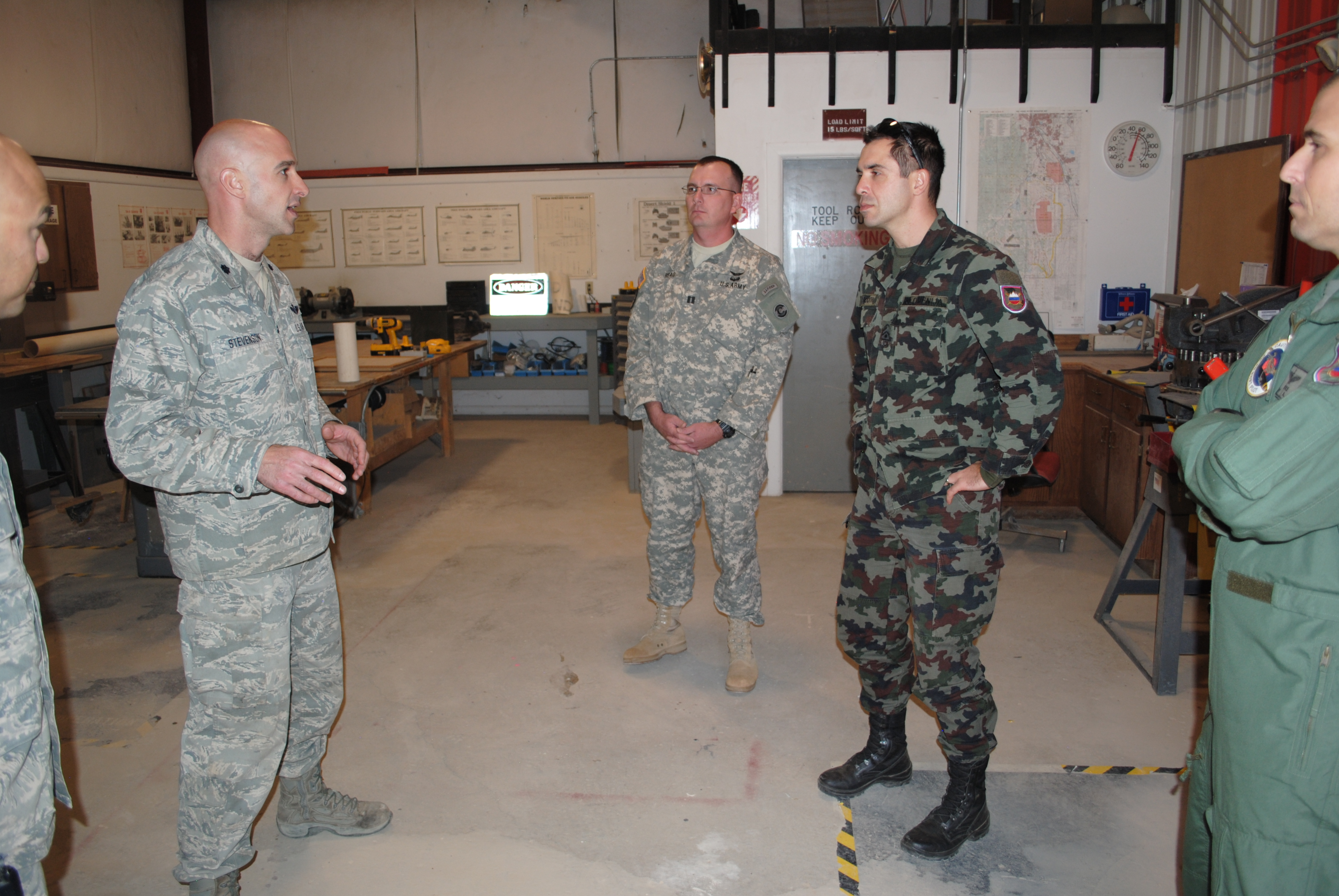
Leaders from Colorado and Slovenia discuss range at Fort Carson, Colo., Oct. 31, 2012

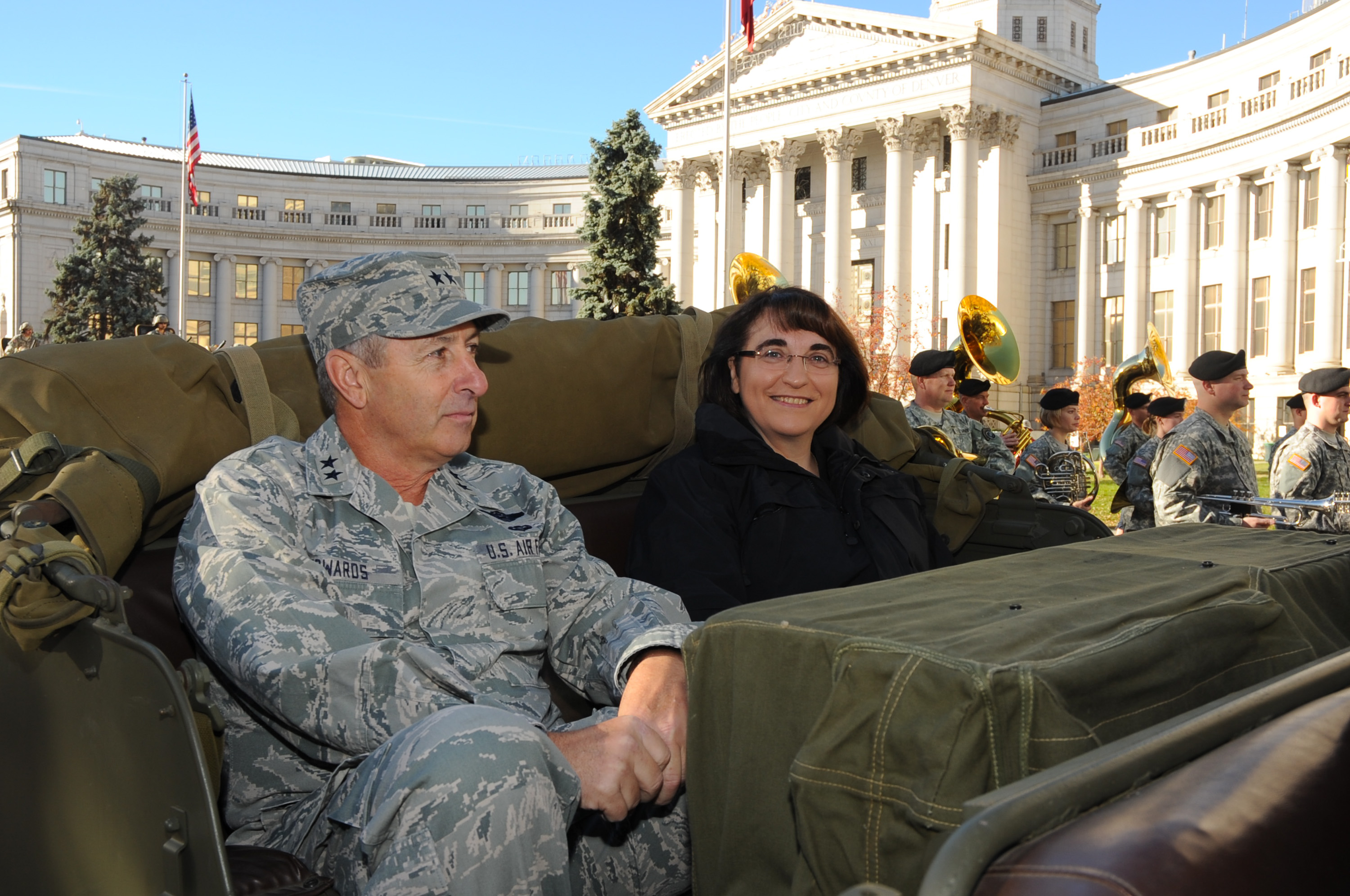
Slovenian Defense Minister Dr. Ljubica Jelusic participates in the 2010 Denver Veterans Day parade with Adjutant General Maj. Gen. H. Michael Edwards

The Colorado–Slovenia National Guard Partnership is one of 25 European partnerships that make up the U.S. European Command State Partnership Program and one of 88 worldwide partnerships that make-up the National Guard State Partnership Program.

The Republic of Slovenia signed a bilateral affairs agreement with the U.S. Department of Defense and the State of Colorado on 31 March 1994 establishing the Colorado-Slovenia State Partnership Program. Colorado Governor Roy Romer signed an Executive Order proclamation supporting the military-to-military partnership program between the Colorado National Guard and the territorial Defense Forces for the Republic of Slovenia on 31 March 1994. This Executive Order Proclamation was re-signed by John W. Hickenlooper on 14 March 2012.

== History ==
The Republic of Slovenia gained independence 25 June 1991, as a constitutional representative democracy from the country of Yugoslavia in a 10-day war. The United States of America recognized the Republic of Slovenia as a Sovereign Nation on 7 April 1992 and the United Nations recognized the nation on 22 May 1992. The National Guard Bureau of the United States selected the State of Colorado National Guard to be a partner state with the Defense Forces of the Republic of Slovenia.

The Colorado-Slovenia State Partnership was established in March 1994 for the purpose of fostering security cooperation between the United States and Slovenia and to support the objectives of the Supreme Headquarters Allied Powers Europe. Each year, Colorado and Slovenia conduct numerous events in both locations that cover diverse topics such as Senior Leader Engagements, Special Operations Forces Development, Engineer Construction, Military Decision Making Process, Range Development, Airfield Development and Standards, Defense Support to Civil Authorities, Family Programs, and Resiliency. In 2009, Colorado Army National Guard Soldiers attended the Slovenian Mountain Warfare Course and conducted staff training in Bohinjska Bela, Slovenia. Within the framework of the Ambassador's Mission Strategic Resource Plan (MSRP) and EUCOM's Theater Security Strategy, the Colorado-Slovenia Partnership strengthens bilateral security relationships, enhances partner capacity and promotes effective civil-military relations.

Throughout this enduring relationship, currently in its third decade, Colorado and Slovenia have successfully executed 270 events, deployed four Operational Mentor Liaison Teams, and deployed two Military Advisory Teams to Afghanistan. As of now, Colorado and Slovenia continue to look at other co-deployment opportunities to further expand the partnership and mutual development.

== Partnership focus ==
The focus for the near future is on assisting the Slovene Armed Forces (SAF) in completing a long-term force transformation project culminating in increased ability to meet NATO Standards and objectives for participation in Unified Land Operations (ULO). Current planning is preparing SAF for a total force plan affecting force realignment and 5 year planning, development of Pocek range, and Cerklje airfield development to NATO standards.

Additional areas of focus include:

1. Development of the Slovenian Range capabilities
2. Cerklje Airfield capabilities
3. Force Transformation
4. Combined Training Center of Excellence
5. Multi-National Battle Group

== Funding ==
State Partnership Program funding is distributed by National Guard Bureau for SPP activity.

Event activities are categorized in two areas: military and civilian. U.S. statutes label participation by the following definitions:

SPP activity: Any security cooperation activity authorized by law, supported by funds appropriated to the DoD, occurring between a U.S. State's National Guard personnel and that State's partner nation's personnel.

SPP civilian engagement activity: Any SPP activity authorized by law that includes engagement between a U.S. State's National Guard personnel and civilians or a civilian agency from a partner nation not affiliated with that nation's Ministry of Defense.

Slovenia became a member of NATO and the World Bank in 2004. Becoming a member of the aforementioned has precluded Slovenian Armed Forces (SAF) from funding that allows SAF Soldiers being funded to travel to Colorado under SPP. This limits the number of exchanges reciprocated in the U.S., but participation is a focus of partnering either in Colorado or Slovenia.

An overview of U.S. military training programs is broken into the following categories:

1. International Military Education and Training (IMET) (1994-2012) $13.5M with the total number of students 916 trained on individual courses in the U.S. or in Germany, 500 trained on
2. Mobile Training Teams (MTT).
3. Counterterrorism Fellowship Program (CTFP) (2006-2012) $500K with the total number of students 45 trained on individual courses (mainly in Europe), 450 trained on four regional seminars hosted in Slovenia.
4. 1206 funding (2010-2011) $555K with the total of students trained on individual courses in Germany being 290. Marshall Center (1997-2012) having a total number of graduates of 115.
5. Foreign Military Sales (FMS) FMS Training (2007-2011) totaling $1.5M with 326 FMS students.

Currently, SPP events with Slovenia are funded for $64,800 in the FY 13. This funding will first focus on a Senior Leader Visit, Defense Support to Civil Authorities initiatives, and the further development of the Colorado/Slovenia Five-Year Strategic Plan. The funding will then be used to target growth in the newly termed Public-Private Sector Partnership (PPP). This growth will help to create greater efficiencies in the interaction between the public and private sectors through their shared relationship with the SPP, both in Slovenia and the United States.

Civil engagements initiated in 2010 under the growth of Military to Civilian events, but were quickly put on hold due to restrictions in the purpose of the appropriations available to the SPP at that time. Future civilian engagements are being planned to expand on sister medical, education, and business opportunities. This will further be solidified during the activities planned during the 20th year celebration of the program in May 2013.
