= New Jersey–Cyprus National Guard Partnership =

Cyprus-New Jersey State Partnership
- Part of the U.S. European Command State Partnership Program
- New Jersey Cyprus
- Origin: 2022
- Country president: Nikos Christodoulides
- Minister of defense: Michalis Giorgallas
- Ambassador to U.S.: Leonidas Pantelides
- Ambassador to Cyprus: Julie D. Fisher
- Adjutant general: Brigadier General Lisa J. Hou, D.O
- NATO member: No
- EU member: Yes (1 May 2004)

The New Jersey–Cyprus National Guard Partnership is one of 25 European partnerships that make-up the U.S. European Command State Partnership Program and one of 88 worldwide partnerships that make-up the National Guard State Partnership Program

The New Jersey National Guard has been selected as the new state partner for the Republic of Cyprus, the third-largest island in the Eastern Mediterranean Sea. Through the National Guard's State Partnership Program, National Guard units throughout the United States conduct military-to-military engagements, guided by U.S. State Department foreign policy goals, and develop person-to-person ties with their partners.

The Republic of Cyprus is New Jersey's second SPP partner. The New Jersey National Guard recently marked 21 years of formal partnership with the Republic of Albania.

== History ==
In the aftermath of the Russo-Turkish War (1877–1878) and the Congress of Berlin, Cyprus was leased to the British Empire which de facto took over its administration in 1878 (though, in terms of sovereignty, Cyprus remained a de jure Ottoman territory until 5 November 1914, together with Egypt and Sudan) in exchange for guarantees that Britain would use the island as a base to protect the Ottoman Empire against possible Russian aggression.

The island of Cyprus would serve Britain as a key military base for its colonial routes. By 1906, when the Famagusta harbour was completed, Cyprus was a strategic naval outpost overlooking the Suez Canal, the crucial main route to India which was then Britain's most important overseas possession. Following the outbreak of the First World War and the decision of the Ottoman Empire to join the war on the side of the Central Powers, on 5 November 1914 the British Empire formally annexed Cyprus and declared the Ottoman Khedivate of Egypt and Sudan a Sultanate and British protectorate.

The Greek Cypriot population, meanwhile, had become hopeful that the British administration would lead to enosis. The idea of enosis was historically part of the Megali Idea (Great Idea), a greater political ambition of a Greek state encompassing the territories with Greek inhabitants in the former Ottoman Empire, including Cyprus and Asia Minor with a capital in Constantinople, and was actively pursued by the Cypriot Orthodox Church, which had its members educated in Greece. These religious officials, together with Greek military officers and professionals, some of whom still pursued the Megali Idea (Great idea), would later found the guerrilla organisation Ethniki Organosis Kyprion Agoniston or National Organisation of Cypriot Fighters (EOKA). The Greek Cypriots viewed the island as historically Greek and believed that union with Greece was a natural right. In the 1950s, the pursuit of enosis became a part of the Greek national policy.

On 16 August 1960, Cyprus attained independence after the Zürich and London Agreement between the United Kingdom, Greece and Turkey. Cyprus had a total population of 573,566; of whom 442,138 (77.1%) were Greeks, 104,320 (18.2%) Turks, and 27,108 (4.7%) others. The UK retained the two Sovereign Base Areas of Akrotiri and Dhekelia, while government posts and public offices were allocated by ethnic quotas, giving the minority Turkish Cypriots a permanent veto, 30% in parliament and administration, and granting the three mother-states guarantor rights.

However, the division of power as foreseen by the constitution soon resulted in legal impasses and discontent on both sides, and nationalist militants started training again, with the military support of Greece and Turkey respectively. The Greek Cypriot leadership believed that the rights given to Turkish Cypriots under the 1960 constitution were too extensive and designed the Akritas plan, which was aimed at reforming the constitution in favour of Greek Cypriots, persuading the international community about the correctness of the changes and violently subjugating Turkish Cypriots in a few days should they not accept the plan. Tensions were heightened when Cypriot President Archbishop Makarios III called for constitutional changes, which were rejected by Turkey (Page 17–20) and opposed by Turkish Cypriots.

On 15 July 1974, the Greek military junta under Dimitrios Ioannides carried out a coup d'état in Cyprus, to unite the island with Greece. The coup ousted president Makarios III and replaced him with pro-enosis nationalist Nikos Sampson. In response to the coup, five days later, on 20 July 1974, the Turkish army invaded the island, citing a right to intervene to restore the constitutional order from the 1960 Treaty of Guarantee. This justification has been rejected by the United Nations and the international community.

== Partnership focus ==
The strategic location of the Republic of Cyprus and its European Union membership and support for Western democratic principles make it an important partner for the United States.

This agreement demonstrates the growing partnership between the Republic of Cyprus and the United States on maritime security, counterterrorism, and natural disaster and emergency response.
