= Georgia–Georgia National Guard Partnership =

US-Georgian military training agreement

- Part of the U.S. European Command State Partnership Program
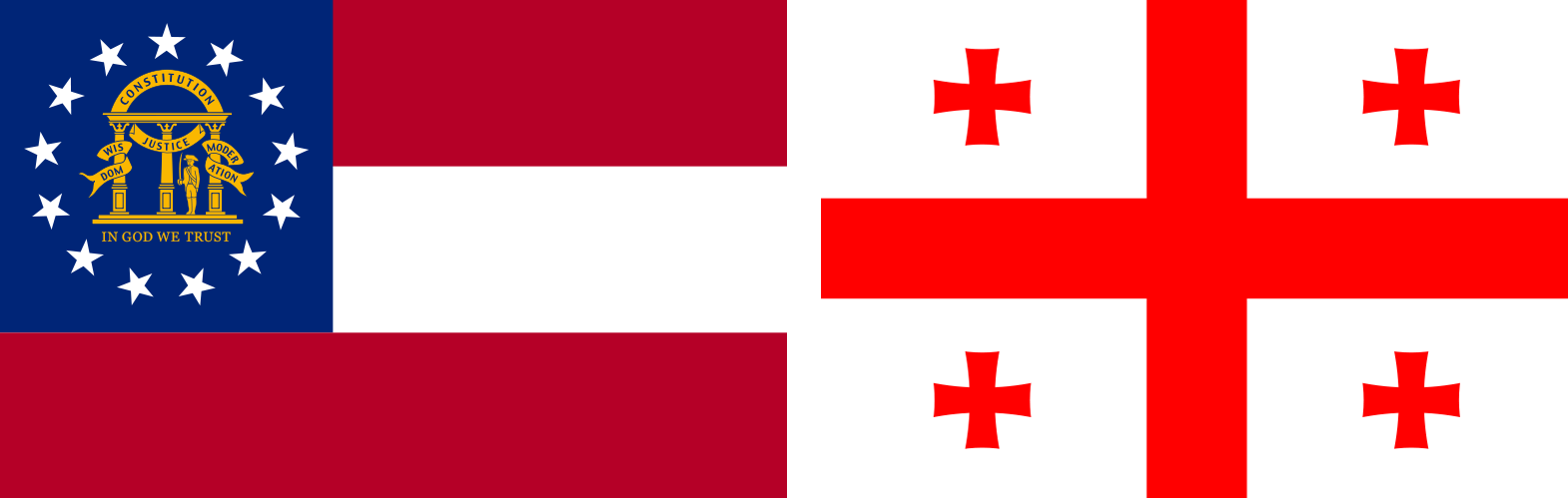
- Georgia–Georgia
- Origin: 1994
- Country president: Salome Zourabichvili
- Prime minister: Irakli Garibashvili
- Minister of defense: Juansher Burchuladze
- Ambassador to U.S.: Davit Bakradze
- Ambassador to Georgia: Kelly C. Degnan
- State Governor: Brian Kemp
- Adjutant general: Thomas Carden
- 2012 Engagements: 4
- NATO member: No
- EU member: No

Georgia

The Georgia–Georgia National Guard Partnership is one of 25 European partnerships that make up the U.S. European Command State Partnership Program and one of 88 worldwide partnerships that make-up the National Guard State Partnership Program, maintained with the Republic of Georgia since 1994. In 2010 the Georgia National Guard helped train over 2,000 Georgian soldiers, and the Republic of Georgia was the largest non-NATO nation provider of troops to the International Security Assistance Force. Soldiers of the Georgia National Guard fought alongside Georgian soldiers in the Iraq War and war in Afghanistan. It was established after the newly independent Republic of Georgia had expressed an interest with the command and organizational structure of the U.S. National Guard.

In 2011, the partnership enabled the Georgian government to complete a presidential initiative to develop the David Aghmashenebeli National Defense Academy. The partnership provided access to U.S. military academies for guidance, and set up mutual collaboration with the University of North Georgia, an American senior military college, to develop civilian and military curricula and internal quality assurance procedures, along with exchange programs and other joint activities.

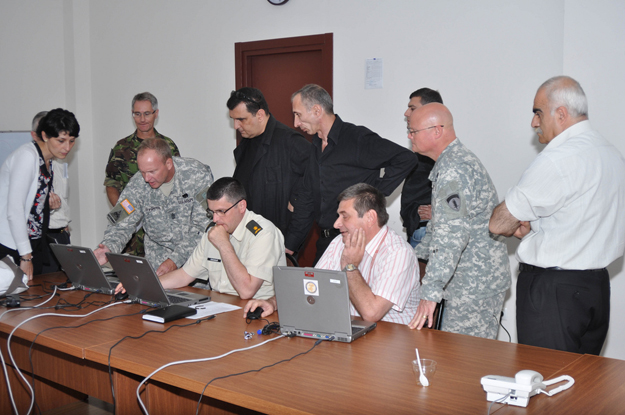
United States Army Europe soldiers leading a table-top disaster response exercise

The partnership includes disaster response and inter-agency coordination efforts. In 2012, the Georgian Ministry of Internal Affairs hosted the 2012 NATO Euro-Atlantic Disaster Response Coordination Center's annual disaster response exercise, which included 38 countries and over 1,000 participants. In the same year the program continued supporting the annual event Shared Horizons, a U.S. European Command directed disaster response exercise conducted by United States Army Europe.
