= Indiana–Slovakia National Guard Partnership =

Indiana–Slovakia State Partnership
- Part of the U.S. European Command State Partnership Program
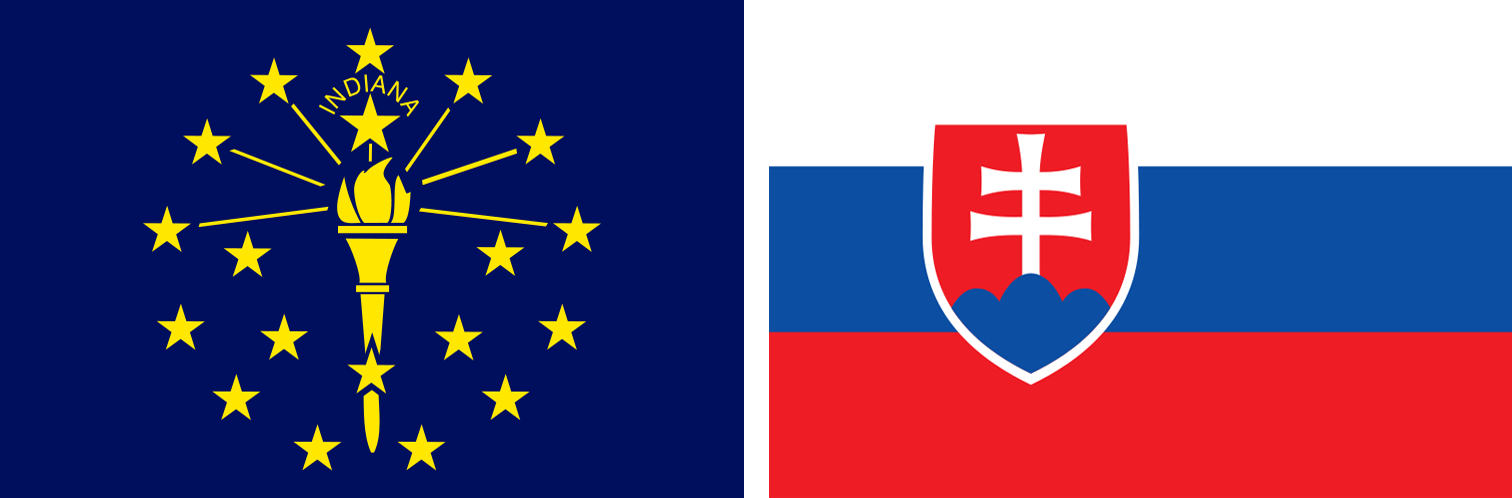
- Origin: 1993
- Country president: Peter Pellegrini
- Prime minister: Robert Fico
- Minister of defense: Robert Kaliňák
- Ambassador to U.S.: Peter Kmec
- Ambassador to Slovakia: Bridget Brink
- Adjutant general: MG R. Dale Lyles
- 2012 Engagements: 6
- NATO member: Yes (2004)
- EU member: Yes (2004)

Slovakia

The Indiana–Slovakia National Guard Partnership is one of 25 European partnerships that make-up the U.S. European Command State Partnership Program and one of 88 worldwide partnerships that make up the National Guard State Partnership Program. Since its inception in 1994, the Indiana and Slovakia partnership has grown steadily in its offerings, training events, and personnel.

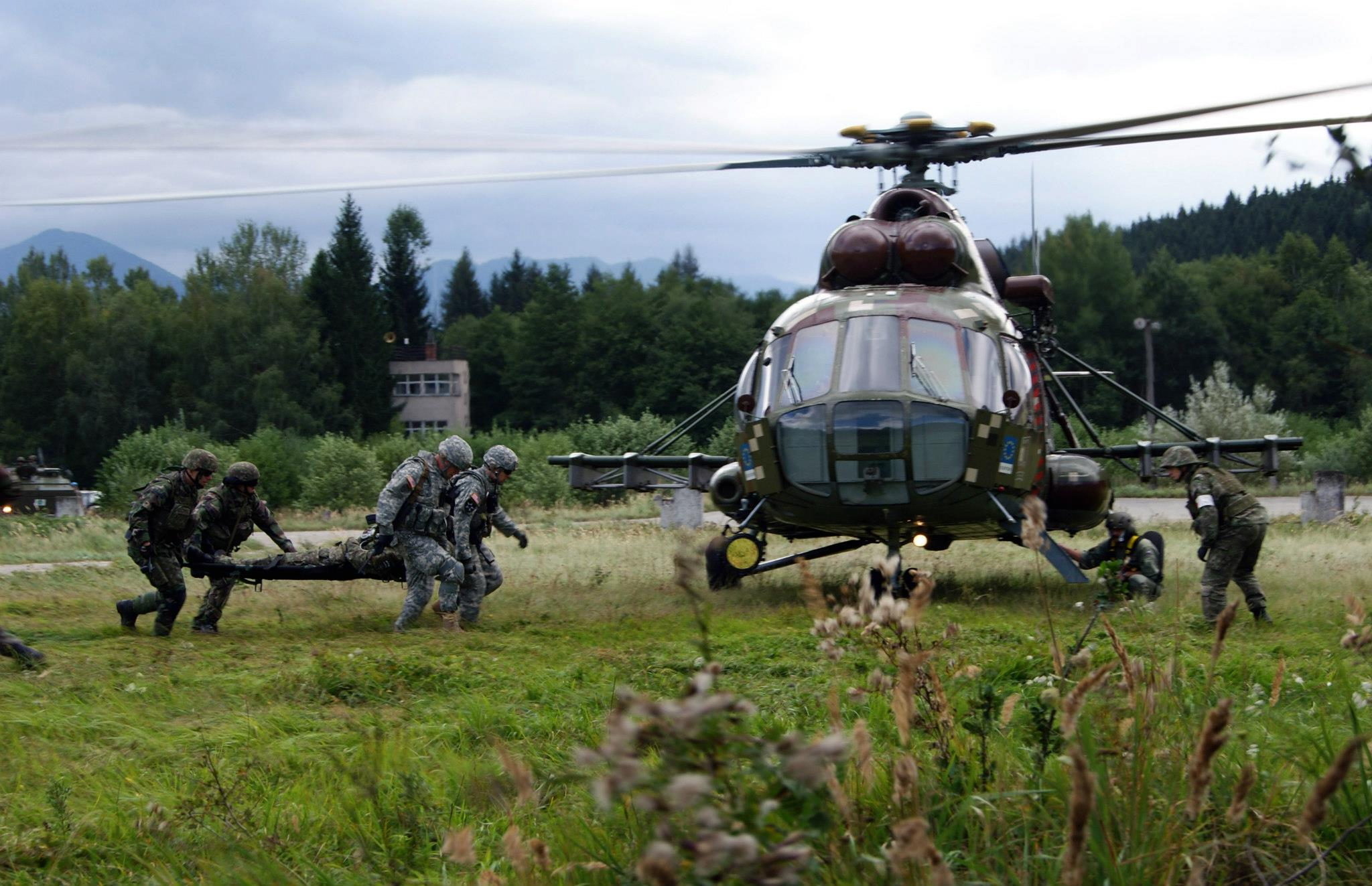
Indiana National Guard and Slovak troops train for medical evacuations in Slovakia

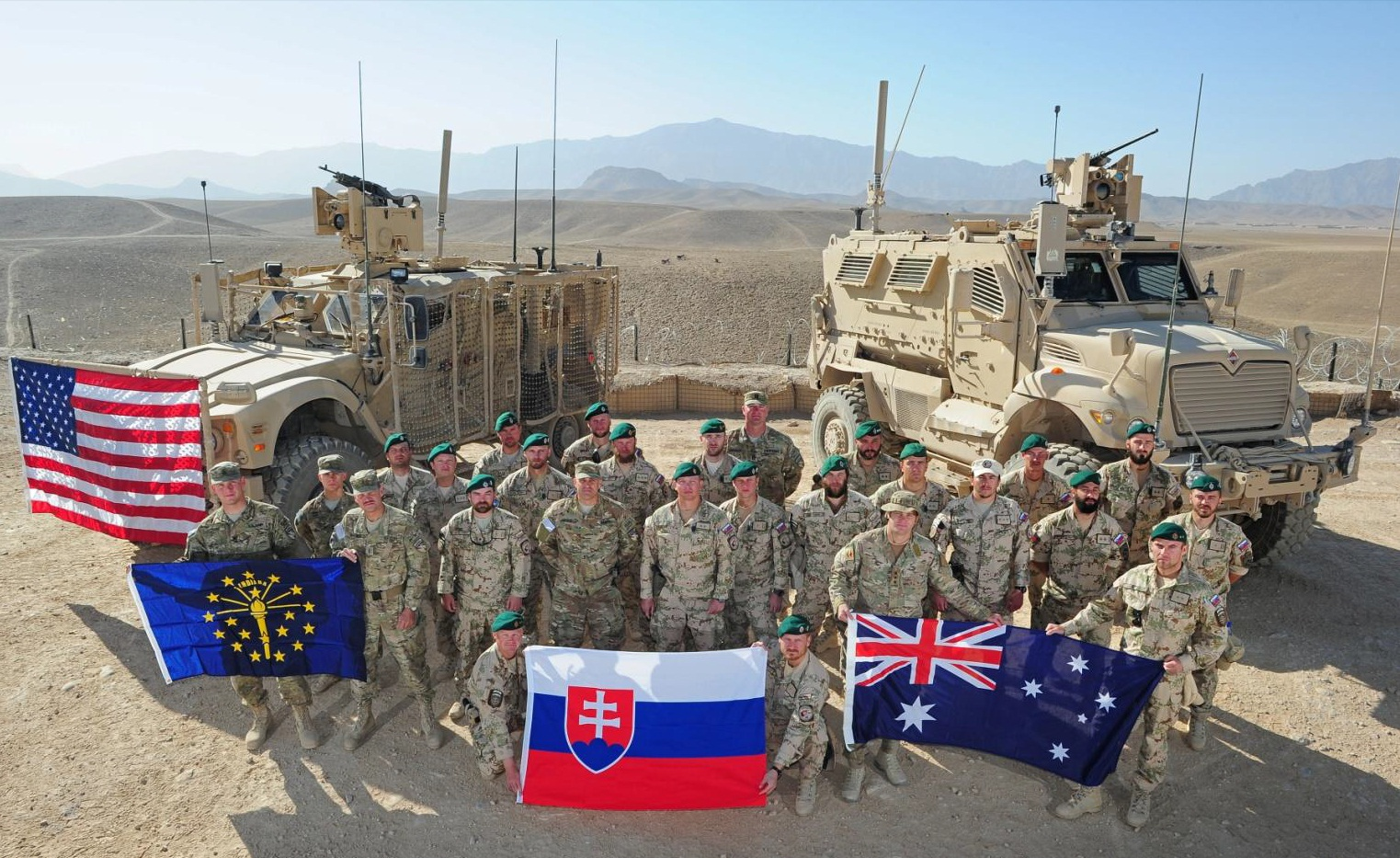
Soldiers from Slovakia, the United States, and Australia at a Forward Operating Base in Afghanistan

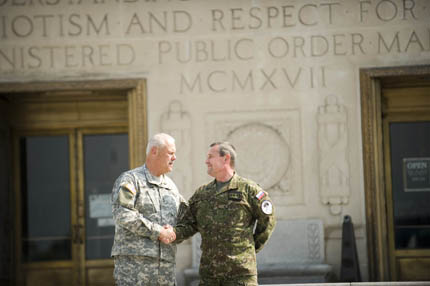
Indiana Adjutant General and Slovak Chief of Defense shake hands on the steps of the Indiana War Memorial, Indianapolis.

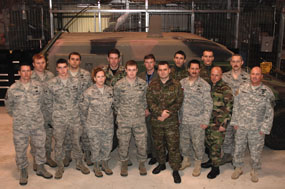
Members of Slovak Armed Forces train with the 181st Intelligence Wing in Indiana

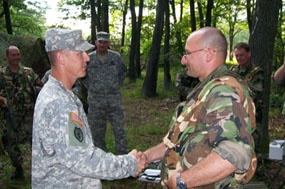
Indiana Guardsmen complete training in Slovakia with members of Slovak Armed Forces

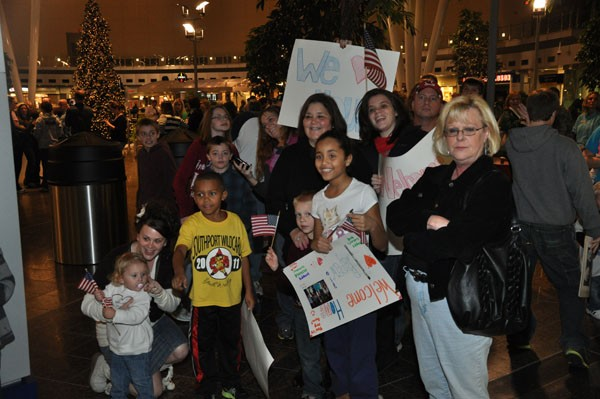
Indiana National Guard family members wait for their Soldiers to return after a 10-month deployment to Afghanistan, December 2011

== History ==
When Czechoslovakia divided into the Czech Republic and Slovakia in 1993, the Department of Defense and the U.S. State Department saw a great opportunity to become allies with these two new nations. The Indiana-Slovakia partnership began in 1994. The decision to partner Slovakia with Indiana came in large because in the late 19th and early 20th century, many Slovak immigrants came to work in the factories in northern Indiana and were essential in making Indiana what it is today. The two militaries have exchanged troops, techniques and training procedures in over 200 bi-lateral events since partnership began. Events have included, among other things:

- NCO Development
- Flight Training
- Fire Support Planning
- Intelligence Preparation of the Battlefield
- Military Decision Making Process

In 2004, Slovakia realized the goal it had set from the start of the partnership – full NATO membership. Slovakia also gained membership into the European Union that same year.

As a further testament to the accomplishments of the Indiana-Slovakia partnership, Indiana Guardsmen and Slovak troops deployed side by side to Afghanistan in 2011. For 10 months, they served under the command of an SAF officer as an Operation Mentor and Liaison Team mentoring Afghan logistics troops.

The advancement of the Slovak military, from a Soviet Era Cold War style force to an ally who is currently fighting alongside our fellow Indiana Guardsmen in Afghanistan is truly remarkable. We were welcomed not only as allies, but as friends and brothers-in-arms amid the backdrop of a beautiful countryside filled with genuinely hospitable people.

— COL Ron Westfall, Director of Plans, Operations, and Readiness, Indiana National Guard
