= California Military Department =

American state agency

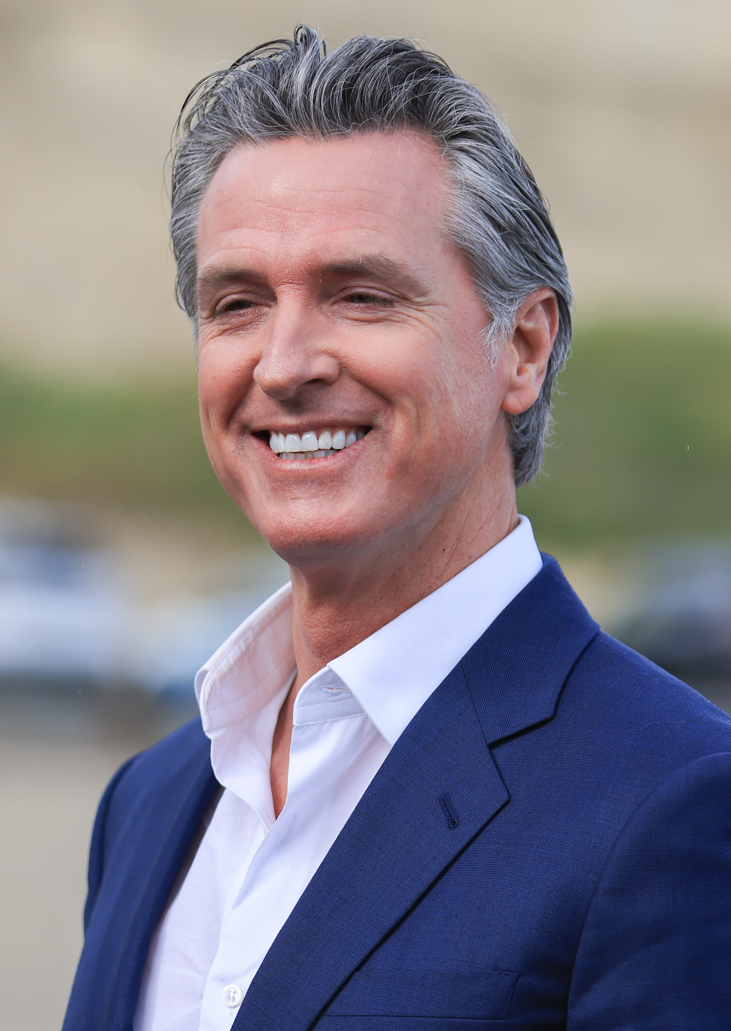
- Governor Gavin Newsom, Commander in Chief

Department overview
- Jurisdiction: California
- Headquarters: Sacramento, California; 38°33′17.41″N 121°19′46.78″W
- Annual budget: $149.1M for FY2014-15
- Department executives: Major General Matthew P. Beevers, The Adjutant General; Chief Master Sergeant Lynn E. Williams, Senior Enlisted Advisor to The Adjutant General
- Parent department: Governor of California
- Child agencies: California Army National Guard; California Air National Guard; California State Guard; California Youth and Community Programs
- Website: calguard.ca.gov

The California Military Department is an agency defined under the California Military and Veterans Code § 50. It includes the California National Guard (Army and Air), the California State Guard, and the Youth and Community Programs Task Force.

The California Military Department and the California National Guard are sometimes referred to interchangeably.

== Adjutant General of California ==
The Adjutant General (TAG) is the commander of all State of California military forces and is subordinate only to the Governor. TAG is:

- Chief of Staff to the Governor
- A member of the Governor's cabinet
- Vested with the duties and responsibilities of the Division of Military Affairs
- Head of the Military Department, and responsible for its affairs, functions, duties, funds and property.

In the 1850 law establishing the California Militia, the office of Adjutant General was separate from that of Quartermaster General. In 1852, the two offices were consolidated when William H. Richardson resigned and Quartermaster General William Chauncey Kibbe became Adjutant General.

Adjutants General have included:

- Theron R. Perlee, April 12 - October 5, 1850
- William H. Richardson, October 5, 1850 - May 2, 1852
- William Chauncey Kibbe, May 2, 1852 - April 30, 1864
- Robert Robinson, January 1, 1864 - May 1, 1864
- George S. Evans, May 1, 1864 - May 1, 1868
- James M. Allen, May 1, 1868 – Nov. 23, 1870
- Thomas N. Cazneau, Nov. 23, 1870 – December 21, 1871
- Lucius H. Foote, December 21, 1871 – December 13, 1875
- Patrick F. Walsh, December 13, 1875 - January 9, 1880
- Samuel W. Backus, January 9, 1880 - July 1, 1882
- John F. Sheehan, July 1, 1892 - January 11, 1893
- George B. Crosby, January 11, 1883 – November 1, 1887
- Richard H. Orton, November 1, 1887 – January 9, 1891
- Charles Carroll Allen, January 9, 1891 – May 24, 1895
- Andrew W. Bartlett, May 24, 1895 - December 23, 1898
- Robert L. Peeler, December 23, 1898 - June 1, 1899
- William H. Seamans, June 1, 1899 - January 3, 1902 (died in office)
- George Stone, January 13, 1902 - February 15, 1904
- Joseph B. Lauck, February 15, 1904 - January 7, 1911
- Edwin A. Forbes, January 7, 1911 - June 18, 1915 (died in office)
- Charles W. Thomas, Jr., June 19, 1915 - December 15, 1916
- James J. Borree, December 16, 1916 - November 30, 1923
- Richard E. Mittelstaedt, December 1, 1923 - January 5, 1931
- Seth E.P. Howard, January 6, 1931 - June 26, 1935 (died in office)
- Paul Arndt, June 27 - October 17, 1935
- Harry H. Moorehead, October 18, 1935 - January 3, 1939
- Patrick J.H. Farrell, January 4, 1939 - June 10, 1940
- Richard E. Mittelstaedt, June 10, 1940 - March 3, 1941
- Joseph O. Donovan, March 3, 1941 - July 10, 1942
- Junnius Pierce, July 14, 1942 - January 13, 1943
- Ray W. Hays, January 14, 1943 - November 30, 1944
- Victor R. Hansen, December 27, 1944 - April 28, 1946
- Curtis D. O'Sullivan, April 29, 1946 - July 15, 1951
- Earl M. Jones, July 16, 1951 - December 31, 1960
- Roderic L. Hill, January 1, 1961 - January 1, 1967
- Glenn C. Ames, March 22, 1967 - June 5, 1975
- Frank J. Schober, June 6, 1975 - December 31, 1982
- Willard A. Shank, January 3, 1983 - February 13, 1987
- Robert C. Thrasher, February 14, 1987 - October 9, 1992
- Robert W. Barrow, October 10 - December 31, 1992
- Tandy K. Bozeman, January 1, 1993 - April 27, 1999
- Paul D. Monroe, Jr., April 29, 1999 - March 2004
- Thomas W. Eres, March 2004 - June 6, 2005
- John Alexander, June 7 - August 1, 2005
- William H. Wade II, September 1, 2005 - February 1, 2010
- Mary J. Kight, February 2, 2010 - April 15, 2011
- David S. Baldwin, April 16, 2011 – July 31, 2022
- Matthew P. Beevers, August 1, 2022 – Present

== Office of the Adjutant General ==
The Office of the Adjutant General (OTAG) is enumerated in CA Military & Veteran's Code § 161 (recently amended by SB807 on 9/17/12) and consists of:

- The Adjutant General (TAG)
- The Deputy Adjutant General (DAG)
- Assistant Adjutant General, Army (AAG Army)
- Assistant Adjutant General, Air (AAG Air)
- Chief of Staff and Director, Joint Staff (CoS/Dir. JS)
- and others as prescribed by laws or regulations of the United States

== California National Guard ==
- California Army National Guard
- California Air National Guard
- California State Guard

The department's Sunburst Youth Academy is run by the California National Guard.

== California Cadet Corps ==
The California Cadet Corps (CACC) is a paramilitary youth organization in California open to students in the college, high school, middle school and elementary school grades.

Established through statute in 1911, it has trained more than a million young people. It is one of five budgeted youth programs of the CMD. The California Military and Veterans Code (MVC Section 517) authorizes CACC units as part of all regular schools, for all children in the state. The CACC is a statewide, school-based, applied leadership program conducted within a military framework. Its primary goal was originally to prepare young men to be officers in the United States military, after Brigadier General Edwin A. Forbes saw that the Germans already had such programs before World War I. The program's goal has since expanded not only to prepare young men and women for military service, but also for the business world, where communication and leadership skills are essential.

The CACC's current objectives are to:

- Develop leadership, citizenship and patriotism
- Promote academic excellence
- Encourage personal health and wellness
- Teach basic military subjects

These expanded goals provide personal growth and leadership opportunities for cadets from middle school through high school levels. Activities include summer encampments, field training (including land navigation), marksmanship, and military drill competitions.

The development and maintenance of the CACC's individual units is a shared responsibility of the local school authorities and the CMD. Commandants must be credentialed by the California Commission on Teacher Credentialing and appointed by the Adjutant General.

In accordance with Sections 509–512 of the California Military and Veterans Code, the CMD is responsible for providing uniforms and equipment, developing curriculum, and conducting state level competitions, activities, and awards programs for the cadets. The CMD provides in-service and pre-service training for adult commandants and volunteers across the state. The CMD is also responsible for issuing state orders for officers and enlisted personnel and updating Commandant and Cadet Regulations.

The CACC program is offered through the school as a component of its school mission and curriculum. The CACC military science class can be taken as an elective, or for credit as a substitute for physical education—a decision each school or district makes based on the course of instruction provided, the instructors' credentials, and the alignment of the curriculum with state standards. California State Content Standards in health, science, physical education, social science, language arts, English language development, and mathematics are embedded in the CACC curriculum's content and activities.

The CACC serves as the “national model” for school-based applied leadership programs, and is designed to:

- Support and enhance academic achievement
- Provide training and applied leadership opportunities
- Foster good citizenship and patriotism
- Provide basic military knowledge
- Promote health, fitness and wellness

The CACC provides a structured learning environment to facilitate academic success, leadership development, physical training and improved self-esteem through attaining achievable goals. It continues to receive support from the education community and civic leaders throughout California.

== Unorganized militia ==
The unorganized militia of California is the fourth component of the state militia, comprising, like the other three active militia components, all able-bodied male residents of the state between 18 and 45 years of age and other persons who have voluntarily applied and are otherwise eligible to serve.

The unorganized militia may be called for active duty in case of "war, rebellion, insurrection, invasion, tumult, riot, breach of the peace, public calamity or catastrophe, or other emergency, or imminent danger" of such an event by the Governor or officers designated by the Governor.

That is, the unorganized militia consists of ordinary persons not in active military service but liable or willing to serve, who may be called for active duty by the Governor in case of utter emergency. The name unorganized militia is confusing because of the dated language of the statute; it refers simply to the selective service pool of the state military in modern sense. In particular, it must not be confused with paramilitary organizations, colloquially called "militias" in the modern language, which operate outside of the state military authority. Paramilitary organizations are prohibited by law in California.

== Past California State Militia Units ==
- California State Militia Units 1850-60
- California State Militia Units 1861-65
