= California Cadet Corps =

Paramilitary youth organization in California, US

California Cadet Corps logo

The California Cadet Corps (CACC), originally formed as the California High School Cadets, is a component of the California Military Department's Youth and Community Programs Task Force ("Task Force Torch"). The California Cadet Corps is an educational leadership youth organization in California open to college students as well as students in high school, middle school, and elementary school.

== Role and purpose ==
The six objectives of the California Cadet Corps are to develop

1. Leadership
2. Citizenship
3. Patriotism
4. Academic Excellence
5. Basic Military Knowledge
6. Health, Wellness, and Fitness

The Cadet Corps motto is "Essayons," a word in the French language meaning "Let us try."

The California Cadet Corps (CACC) is a state-funded, school-based educational leadership program founded in 1911. The CACC is codified in California Military & Veterans Code §500–520 and administered by the California Military Department’s Youth and Community Programs Task Force . It operates as an elective program within participating schools and emphasizes structured, team-based learning environments designed to develop responsibility, discipline, and leadership skills.

The CACC's primary goal is not to send all of its cadets into military service. More of the organization's cadets have gone on to careers in fields such as science, medicine, education, and aerospace than have entered the military.

Historically, the Cadet Corps was established to prepare young men for potential service as officers in the United States military, influenced by similar youth military training programs observed in Europe prior to World War I. Over time, however, the program's purpose has expanded beyond military preparation. The modern Cadet Corps serves both male and female students and focuses on leadership development applicable to a wide range of postsecondary paths, including higher education, public service, the civilian workforce, as well as the military.

The program emphasizes:

- Leadership development
- Civic engagement
- Health and wellness
- Emergency preparedness
- Career exploration
- Community service

Instruction is designed to support the development of interpersonal, professional, and communication skills, while promoting personal responsibility, teamwork, and resilience. Although the Cadet Corps incorporates military traditions and organizational structure, it is not a basic training program or a military recruitment initiative.

== History of the California Cadet Corps ==
The CACC, originally named as, "California High School Cadets" until 1935, was founded on 5 April 1911 by Brigadier General Edwin Alexander Forbes and created by an act of the Legislature. The California High School Cadets program was designed to prepare young men for service in the California National Guard. At that time, every California high school was required to have a California Cadet Corps unit if at least thirty-two students at the school were interested in the program.

The program flourished during both of the World Wars and beyond, until the start of the Vietnam War. At that time there was criticism of the military and CACC's funding was cut by the state of California. The program was essentially inactive throughout that time period. The CACC regained its funding in 1999, and since then has begun a continuous rise in enrollment. As of 2007, there were 8,000 cadets in the state. As of 2025, there are roughly 10,000 cadets in the CACC that comprise around 100 active units across the state in urban, costal, and rural areas. Two of the most well-attended statewide events to date are the CACC's annual State Drill Competition and Summer Encampment events.

=== Affiliation with Military Schools ===
Since its founding in 1911, the California Cadet Corps has been closely associated with military-style secondary education in California. Throughout much of the 20th century, most military schools operating in the state maintained an affiliation, or operated as an integrated institution, with the California Cadet Corps.

Historical records indicate that at least a dozen military schools—including private, religious, boarding, and preparatory institutions—were affiliated with the Cadet Corps at various points during the 20th century. These schools incorporated Cadet Corps training and organizational structure into their academic and leadership programs, reinforcing the organization's role as the primary state-sponsored military youth program in California.

Since its founding, Cadet Corps–affiliated schools have spanned a wide range of educational models, including public charter, private, religious, preparatory, and boarding military schools.

As of the early 21st century, the California Cadet Corps continues to maintain affiliations with military schools across the state. Currently, six military schools operate Cadet Corps units, reflecting the program's continued presence within California's military education tradition.

Historic Military Schools (No longer operating or no longer affiliated with the CACC)	Current Military Schools (Currently operating and affiliated with the CACC)
St. Joseph Military Academy; Ramsey Military School; Urban Military Academy; Ridgewood Military Academy; Southern California Military Academy; Cheviot Hills Military Academy; Page Military Academy; Mount Lowe Military Academy; Southwestern Military Academy; Harding Military Academy; Elsinore Naval and Military Academy; North Valley Military Institute	Oakland Military Institute; California Military Institute; Leadership Military Academy (Moreno Valley); Porterville Military Academy; La Sierra Military Academy; American Christian Military Academy of Excellence

== Authorization ==
The California Cadet Corps is referenced in CMVC Sections 500 through 520.1. All colleges, community colleges, and high schools in California may form companies of cadets on their campuses whenever at least 100 students voluntarily enroll in the program. Boards of education, school principals, and college presidents are required by law to cooperate with the Adjutant General to implement California Cadet Corps programs.

== Organization ==
The California Cadet Corps (CACC) is a state-funded, school-based youth leadership development program administered by the California Military Department under the Youth and Community Programs Task Force of the California National Guard. The CACC operates in public, charter, and private school settings across California and emphasizes leadership, citizenship, and personal development through a structured elective curriculum.

=== State-Level Administration ===
Oversight of the CACC at the state level is provided by the Headquarters Staff, which is responsible for statewide policy, training standards, curriculum guidance, and statewide events. The Headquarters Staff coordinates program implementation, supports brigade administration, and serves as the primary liaison between the Cadet Corps and the California Military Department. Commissioned officers, warrant officers, and enlisted personnel of the California Cadet Corps are appointed by the Adjutant General of the California Military Department in accordance with CMVC Section 520.1.

==== Brigade and Regional Structure ====
The Cadet Corps is organized into regional administrative jurisdictions known as brigades, which oversee subordinate units within defined geographic areas. Brigades serve as the principal regional command and administrative level, providing operational oversight, coordination of training activities, and support for subordinate battalions and regiments. Brigades enable cadet leaders to exercise a higher level of command responsibility and facilitate combined activities across multiple units.

===== Brigades =====
A brigade is a geographic grouping of two or more battalions or units within a region, functioning as an intermediate command structure between Headquarters and the local battalion level. Brigade commanders and brigade staff, typically selected from senior cadets within the organization, provide communications, planning, and leadership oversight for subordinate units throughout the school year. Adult mentors and advisors support brigade staff by ensuring subordinate units comply with program standards and serve as resources for training and promotions.

As of school year 2025–2026, the Cadet Corps includes 15 cadet training brigades in addition to the 10th Corps. The 10th Corps functions as a state-level training and leadership formation operating directly under the Headquarters Staff, acting as a statewide cadet staff organization that plans and executes statewide activities and provides oversight for regional brigade commanders.

Brigade	Regiments	Battalions	Estimated Strength (Cadet body)	Regions/Areas of Jurisdiction
1st	2	16	850 - 1,600	(Largest Brigade) Eastern Inland Empire, Joshua Tree communities, the Coachella Valley, and Imperial County.
2nd		3	130 - 200	Core Riverside County Communities
3rd		6	400 - 650	Cities of Visalia and Porterville surrounding communities
4th	2	2	~530	Oakland Military Institute, Oakland CA
5th		3	100 - 300	Town of Oakhurst and surrounding communities
6th		7	200 - 600	Northern California (Starting from Sacramento)
7th		1	Unknown - ~100	Altus Schools (Online School Based in San Diego)
8th		4	240 - 400	San Fernando Valley to Oxnard communities
9th	2	2	1,000 - 1,050	California Military Institute, Perris CA
11th		10	500 - 1,500	San Bernardino City Unified School District
12th		3	150 - 300	Central Coast Areas
13th		2	~300	Porterville Military Academy, Porterville CA
14th		3	100 - 400	City of Compton and surrounding communities
15th		8	400 - 700	Lancaster to Bakersfield and surrounding communities
18th		8	400 - 800	High Desert area northern San Bernardino County

===== Regiments =====
A regiment is defined in Cadet Corps regulations as a grouping of two or more units within the same geographic region, established to improve local program administration and facilitate regional activities. Regiments operate below the brigade level and offer an additional organizational tier where needed to support command and control among closely situated units.

===== Battalions, Companies, and Platoons =====
Within each brigade or regiment, units are typically organized into battalions, which consist of one or more subordinate elements. Each battalion is responsible for day-to-day leadership development and instruction at the local school level and may be further divided into companies, which are commonly composed of two platoons. This hierarchical structure reflects a model adapted from military organization to support leadership opportunities while maintaining an educational environment.

=== Unit-Level Organization ===
Local California Cadet Corps units are established at participating public and private educational institutions in accordance with Cadet Corps regulations and operate as the fundamental organizational elements of the program. A unit is defined as a school-based organization composed of enrolled cadets, authorized instructors, and approved administrative support, formed for the purpose of conducting Cadet Corps instruction and activities.

Units are organized based on cadet enrollment and may be structured as platoons, companies, battalions, regiments, or brigades, consistent with prescribed tables of organization. Smaller units typically operate at the platoon or company level, while schools with sufficient enrollment and administrative capacity may be designated as battalions or regiments. In limited cases—most commonly at military school institutions—units may be authorized to operate at the brigade level.

Each unit is assigned a numerical designation and is administratively subordinate to a battalion, regiment, or brigade headquarters within its geographic area. Units are responsible for executing the Cadet Corps curriculum, maintaining accountability of personnel and equipment, and participating in required inspections, training events, and reporting procedures.

Unit programs are conducted through a combination of classroom instruction, leadership laboratories, drill and ceremonies, physical fitness training, and service activities, and may operate as elective courses during the school day or as co-curricular or extracurricular programs, subject to local educational authority approval.

Cadet leadership positions within the unit mirror standard military organizational roles and provide structured opportunities for command, staff experience, and leadership development. Adult instructors assigned to units serve as commandants or tactical officers and are responsible for supervision, training oversight, and compliance with Cadet Corps regulations.

Units serve as the primary venues through which cadets receive instruction, apply leadership principles, and participate in statewide Cadet Corps programs and activities.

=== Funding ===
The California Cadet Corps is primarily supported by state funding through the California Military Department, with additional costs sometimes covered by participating schools and local education funding. The state appropriation provides for uniforms, curriculum materials, statewide activities, logistical support, and administrative staffing at the headquarters level.

Historically, the state budget for the program has been described as increasing to support program expansion, including funding for uniforms, activities, supplies, curriculum development, and additional staff.

Participating schools may provide support for local costs not covered by state funding, including instructor compensation or district contributions under local education funding formulas.

All core program materials such as uniforms, curriculum, and participation in state events are provided without cost directly to students or schools beyond these instructor funding arrangements.

=== Military Staff and Instructors ===
==== Instructor Qualifications ====
Instructional personnel, referred to as commandants, are central to the operation of the California Cadet Corps. Commandants are responsible for classroom instruction, leadership development, unit administration, and student oversight. According to Cadet Corps regulations, instructors must hold a California teaching credential and may obtain specialized credentials related to CACC instruction requirements.

Only instructors with proper appointment and the Designated Subjects Special Subjects Basic Military Drill Credential are authorized to conduct the CACC program, ensuring compliance with California Commission on Teacher Credentialing requirements.

==== Training and Professional Development ====
CACC instructors participate in a professional development pathway designed to align with California teaching standards and military instructional practices. Initial requirements include the Pre-Appointment Course (PAC), which provides foundational knowledge of CACC purpose, structure, and policies.

Further professional development includes the Basic Commandant Training Academy (BCTA) and advanced courses that prepare educators and volunteers to effectively lead and support Cadet Corps programs.

==== Volunteer and Military Participation ====
Individuals from diverse backgrounds, including educators, veterans, and community volunteers may serve in CACC instructional roles subject to approval by school and district policies. Members of the California National Guard and California State Guard may support Cadet Corps activities on temporary State Active Duty orders, with pay and compensation determined by the regulations and policies of their respective service component.

== Cadet ranks and appointments ==
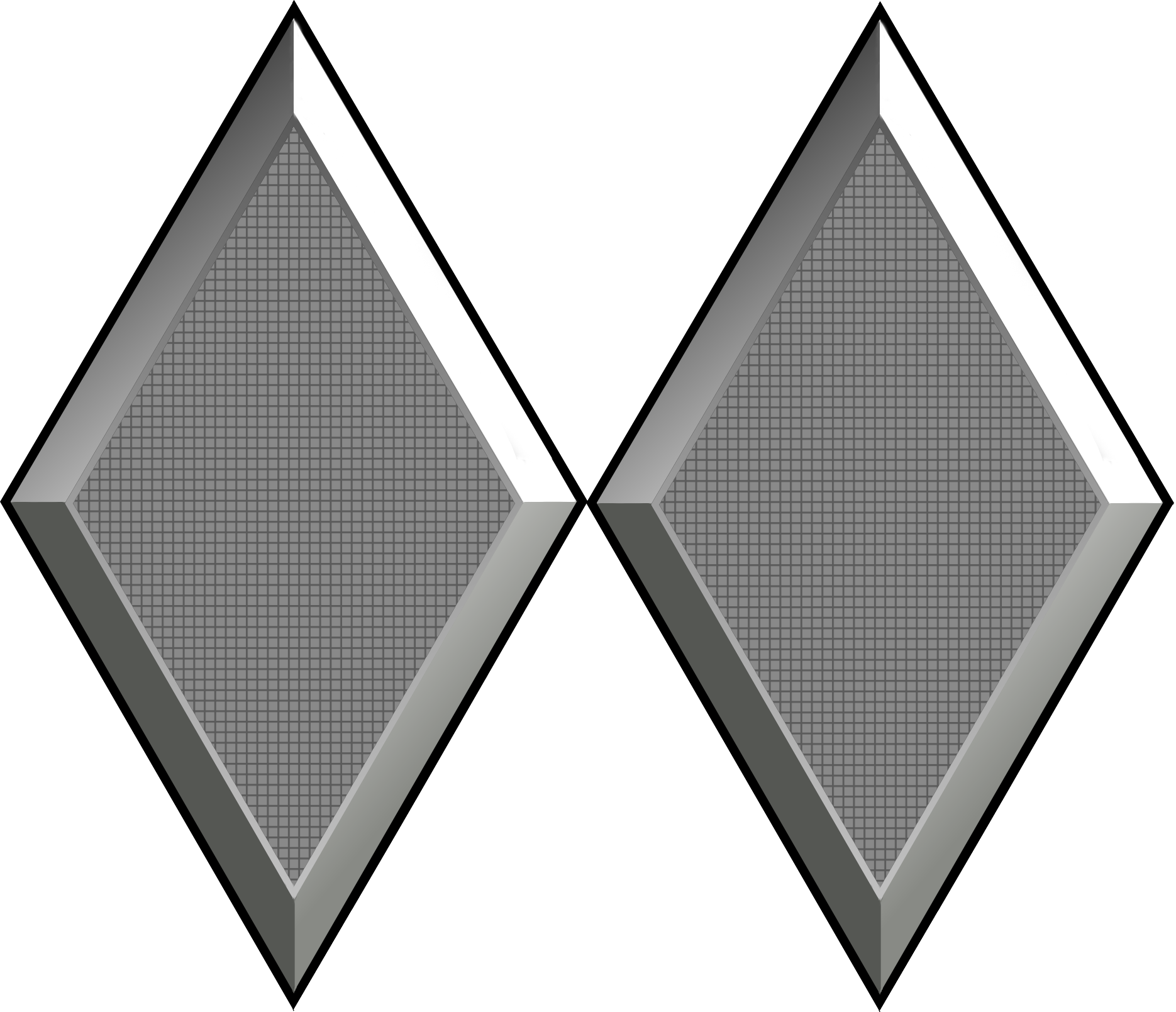
Grade	C/O-6	C/O-5	C/O-4	C/O-3	C/O-2	C/O-1	Officer Candidate
	Cadet Colonel (C/COL)	Cadet Lieutenant Colonel (C/LTC)	Cadet Major (C/MAJ)	Cadet Captain (C/CPT)	Cadet First Lieutenant (C/1LT)	Cadet Second Lieutenant (C/2LT)	Cadet Officer Candidate

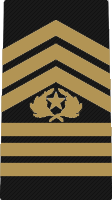
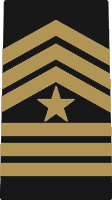
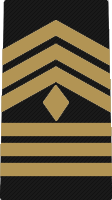
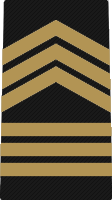
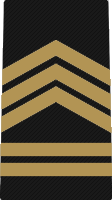
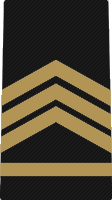
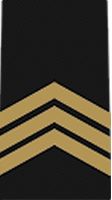
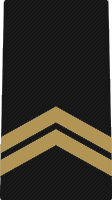
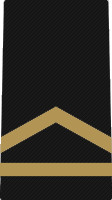
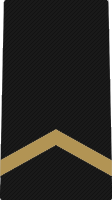
Grade	C/E-9		C/E-8		C/E-7	C/E-6	C/E-5	C/E-4	C/E-3	C/E-2	C/E-1
											No Insignia
	Cadet Command Sergeant Major (C/CSM)	Cadet Sergeant Major (C/SGM)	Cadet First Sergeant (C/1SG)	Cadet Master Sergeant (C/MSG)	Cadet Sergeant First Class (C/SFC)	Cadet Staff Sergeant (C/SSG)	Cadet Sergeant (C/SGT)	Cadet Corporal (C/CPL)	Cadet First Class (CFC)	Cadet (CDT)	Recruit (RCT)

=== Cadet Ranks ===
The California Cadet Corps (CACC) rank structure is modeled closely on that of the United States Army, with some modifications to rank names, insignia, and certain promotion procedures. The CACC uses special ranks for elementary-level cadets, while higher ranks mirror military conventions with a cadet-specific designation.

==== Elementary Cadet Ranks ====
For students in 5th grade and below, the CACC uses a simplified rank system known as Grizzly ranks, numbered Grizzly 1 through Grizzly 4.

==== Enlisted Cadet Ranks ====
Cadet enlisted ranks are modeled after those of the United States Army, however they differ slightly at the Junior Enlisted level.

===== Junior Enlisted Ranks =====
- Recruit (RCT): No insignia worn
- Cadet (CDT): One chevron pointing upward
- Cadet First Class (CFC): One chevron above one rocker

==== Non-Commissioned Officer (NCO) Ranks ====
Cadet NCO ranks are denoted by insignia similar to U.S. Army NCO ranks. Junior NCO ranks and above are denoted with a C/ prefix before the rank initials.

===== Junior NCO Ranks =====
- Cadet Corporal (C/CPL): Two chevrons pointing upward
- Cadet Sergeant (C/SGT): Three chevrons pointing upward

===== Senior NCO Ranks =====
- Cadet Staff Sergeant (C/SSG): Three chevrons above one rocker (straight or round bar) below
- Cadet Sergeant First Class (C/SFC): Three chevrons above two rockers
- Cadet Master Sergeant (C/MSG): Three chevrons above three rockers
- Cadet First Sergeant (C/1SG): Three chevrons above a diamond above three rockers

===== Command Senior Enlisted Leaders =====
- Cadet Sergeant Major (C/SGM): Three chevrons above three rockers with a star centered between them
- Cadet Command Sergeant Major (C/CSM): Three chevrons above three rockers with the Cadet Corps emblem or star in the center, serving as the senior enlisted leader of the Corps.

==== Cadet Officer Ranks ====
Cadet officer ranks are denoted by insignia similar to U.S. Army ROTC cadet ranks.

===== Company Grade Officers =====
- Cadet Second Lieutenant (C/2LT): One gold pip
- Cadet First Lieutenant (C/1LT): One silver pip
- Cadet Captain (C/CPT): Two connected silver pips

===== Field Grade Officers =====
- Cadet Major (C/MAJ): One gold diamond
- Cadet Lieutenant Colonel (C/LTC): One silver diamond
- Cadet Colonel (C/COL): Two connected silver diamonds

=== Promotion and Testing ===
- Cadets must pass examinations to advance in rank, typically achieving at least 80% on written exams to be eligible for promotion to certain positions (e.g. C/SGT, C/2LT, C/MAJ).
- Promotions to staff NCO and officer ranks (C/SSG and higher) involve a promotion board consisting of three adult personnel, often with prior military or Cadet Corps experience.
- Cadets are evaluated on:
  - Uniform preparation and presentation
  - Knowledge of Cadet Corps regulations
  - Leadership principles and philosophy (for officer candidates)

==== Attainment and Distinction ====
- Less than 10% of cadets historically achieve the rank of Cadet Colonel (C/COL).
- The rank system emphasizes leadership development, responsibility, and knowledge of both military tradition and Cadet Corps organization.

=== Leadership Appointments ===
There are many jobs that cadets can hold in the Corps. The lowest level of leadership is Squad Leader (SL). They are usually in charge of 4 to 14 cadets, depending on the size of the unit.

The next leadership role is Platoon Sergeant (PSG). They are in charge of the welfare of their cadets, as well as running day to day platoon operations. PSGs are also in charge of teaching their new platoon leaders (usually newly commissioned lieutenants) how platoons work, and to be a liaison between the Platoon Leader, the First Sergeant, and the Squad Leaders.

Platoon Leaders (PLs) are the first level of officer leadership. They are usually lieutenants, but can be NCOs if the unit strength is low. Platoon Leaders are responsible for leading the platoon and supervising the Squad Leaders and Platoon Sergeant.

Higher level positions within larger units include:

==== Company First Sergeant ====
The company First Sergeant (C/1SG) is an assistant to the Company Commander and is in charge of PSGs. They are usually selected from the highest-ranking cadet NCOs, and are generally the oldest and most experienced NCO in the company.

==== Company Commander and Executive Officer ====
The Company Commander (CO) is the highest-ranking officer in the company, usually a C/CPT. He or she is in charge of leading the company and training the Executive Officer (XO) to take his or her place the following year. The CO is generally a senior in high school. The executive officer is typically a junior in high school that is preparing to be the CO the next year. The XO is in charge of running day-to-day operations and making sure that all of the leaders under his or her command are communicating.

==== Battalion Sergeant Major ====
The Battalion Sergeant Major (C/SGM) has duties similar to that of a First Sergeant, but at a higher level. He or she is in charge of managing all of the First Sergeants in the battalion, as well as being an aide and advisor to the Battalion Commander. He or she also takes charge of the battalion's drill teams, flag details, the leader (US flag bearer) of the colorguards, and anything having to do with military drill and ceremonies. The Sergeant Major position is a disciplining leadership position - they enforce military courtesy and customs and ensure that Company Commanders and company First Sergeants know their duties.

They are the direct communicator between the Brigade Command Sergeant Major and the battalion. They command battalion inspections outside of the Annual General Inspection (AGI). They are also responsible for training junior officers, and they work with the Battalion Executive Officer (BNXO) collaboratively to complete command and staff work.

==== Battalion Commanding Officer and Executive Officer ====
The Battalion Commanding Officer (BNCO) is usually a C/LTC, and has the same responsibilities of a Company Commander at a greater level. The BNCO is responsible for leading his or her Company Commanders and training the Battalion Executive Officer (BNXO). The BNXO (typically a C/MAJ) is in charge of running day-to-day operations and ensuring that all of the leaders under his or her command are communicating.

===== Brigade Command Sergeant Major =====
The Brigade Command Sergeant Major has similar duties as a Battalion Sergeant Major, but at the brigade level. They are the key individual responsible for training and enforcing military drill and ceremonies standards as well as customs and courtesies throughout the brigade. A Brigade Command Sergeant Major is usually a C/SGM or C/CSM.

===== Brigade Commander =====
The Brigade Commander is the highest-ranking, and typically the most distinguished, cadet commissioned officer of their brigade. They are responsible for coordinating and communicating with the command staff of the battalions under them and their brigade-level command staff to create, plan, and executes events. They also communicate orders from the 10th Corps and Headquarters staff to the rest of the brigade, and assist in publishing orders to their subordinate battalions based on guidance from the 10th Corps and Headquarters. The maximum authorized rank for a Brigade Commander is C/COL.

==== Staff Sections ("S-Shops") ====
Staff sections are composed of cadets serving on the command staff of a company, battalion, brigade, or the 10th Corps and are primarily responsible for the welfare of cadets within their units. There are six staff sections (known as "S-Shops") that mirror the staff sections of U.S. Army units.

The S-1 section is responsible for personnel accountability and administration actions within the unit, such as promotions, awards, and maintaining cadet Service Records (Form 13).

The S-2 section handles safety and security. They work with the S-3 to plan for hazards that can impact cadet activities.

The S-3 section is responsible for operations and training within their unit. They are critical to planning events and cadet training activities.

The S-4 section handles logistics and supply. They work with command staff at higher levels to ensure that their unit has the uniforms, supplies, and euqipment that they need for both day-to-day operations and unit events.

The S-5 section handles public affairs for their unit. They are responsible for public-facing media of cadet activities (such as social media pages or unit websites) in accordance with CACC regualtions and school district policies.

The S-6 section is responsible for information technology and communications within the unit. They ensure that cadets have access to the technological tools that they need to be successful in the program.

== Opposition ==
The California Cadet Corps is explicitly opposed in Los Angeles Unified School District by the Coalition Against Militarism in Our Schools, which in their mission statement writes that they are "...working to eliminate the Junior Reserves Officer Training Corp in our High Schools and the California Cadets in our Middle Schools, along with the school community.

== In popular culture ==
In the television series Saved by the Bell, the show's protagonist, Zack Morris, agrees to take part in a pilot program organized by the California Cadet Corps in order to avoid detention.

== See also ==
=== Similar U.S.-Based Organizations ===
Youth-based, non-CACC organizations include:

- Junior Reserve Officer Training Corps (JROTC)
- United States Army Cadet Corps (formerly the American Cadet Alliance)
- Civil Air Patrol
- United States Naval Sea Cadet Corps
- Young Marines
- Middle School Cadet Corps
- Navy League Cadet Corps
- Knickerbocker Greys
- New York Military Academy (NYMA)

=== Similar Foreign Organizations ===
Foreign youth-based organizations include:

- Cadets (youth program) around the world
- Cadet Force (subdivisions between British military branches)
- Canadian Cadet Organizations (subdivisions between Canadian military branches)
- National Cadet Corps (Singapore)
- National Cadet Corps (India)
