= California–Ukraine National Guard Partnership =

California–Ukraine State Partnership
- Part of the U.S. European Command State Partnership Program
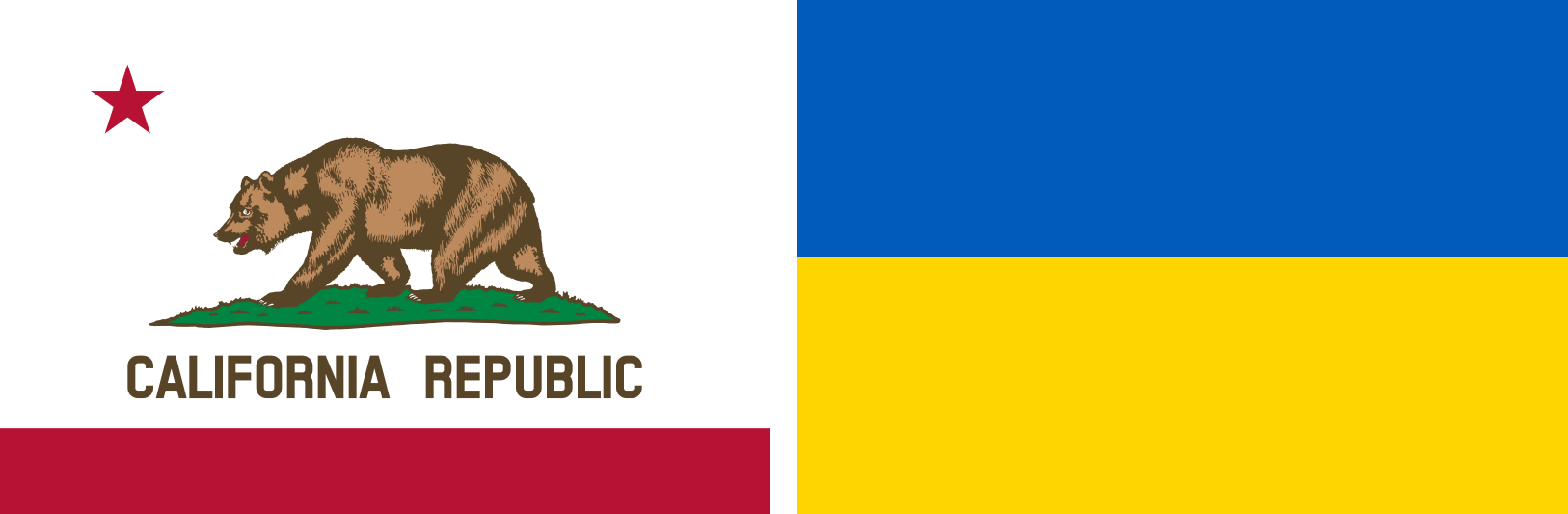
- Origin: 1993
- Country president: Volodymyr Zelenskyy
- Prime minister: Denys Shmyhal
- Minister of defense: Oleksii Reznikov
- Ambassador to U.S.: Oksana Markarova
- Ambassador to Ukraine: Bridget A. Brink
- Adjutant general: MG Mathew P. Beevers
- 2012 Engagements: 6
- NATO member: No
- EU member: No

Ukraine

The California–Ukraine National Guard Partnership is one of 25 European partnerships that make up the U.S. European Command State Partnership Program and one of 88 worldwide partnerships that make-up the National Guard State Partnership Program (SPP). The California–Ukraine State Partnership Program (SPP) is a prominent initiative within the U.S. European Command. Given Ukraine's strategic location and regional influence, the partnership serves as a vital channel for supporting the country's democratic development.

Through the SPP, the California National Guard and Ukraine have addressed a range of social, economic, military and political issues including border security, base conversion, emergency response, inter-agency cooperation, civil-military relations and security cooperation. With hundreds of events completed since its inception in June 1999, the SPP has become an engagement tool that brings together civilian expertise, multi-level government agencies, NATO, non-government organizations and commercial interests.

According to the Office of International Affairs, California Military Department "The Office of International Affairs manages the State Partnership Program (SPP) with Ukraine. The SPP deploys California National Guard teams to Ukraine and brings Ukrainians to the United States for information sharing to assist Armed Forces of Ukraine in re-structuring, modernizing its forces, and strengthening principles of democracy and free market economies. Exchanges include information about the processes underpinning US military structures that result in subordination to civilian control, consensus building, methodologies for achieving objectives, and interagency coordination of civil/military issues. Future missions for International Relations will include partnerships with other countries to bring the same philosophy to these regions of the world as has been done successfully in the Baltics."

According to the Office of Defense Cooperation in Kyiv, "The California – Ukraine partnership directly supports both the goals of the US Ambassador to Ukraine and Commander, U.S. European Command. As part of the Governor's Cabinet, the Adjutant General of the California National Guard facilitates partnerships throughout the state and local governments in California as well as the private sector. Recently, a tuberculosis clinic in Odesa was renovated with funds provided by this office."

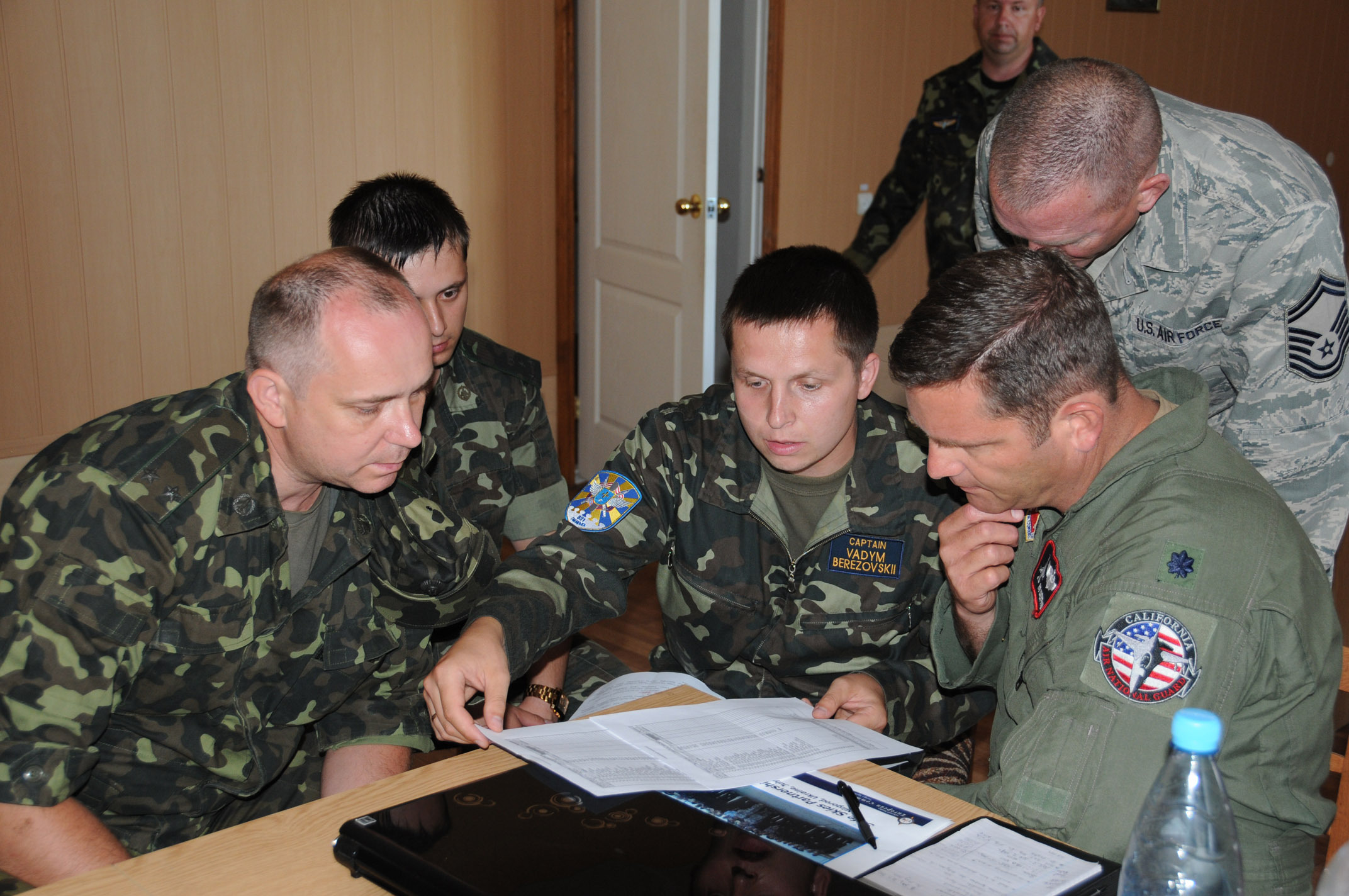
California Air National Guard Soldiers discuss the itinerary for Safe Skies 2011 with Ukrainian counterparts

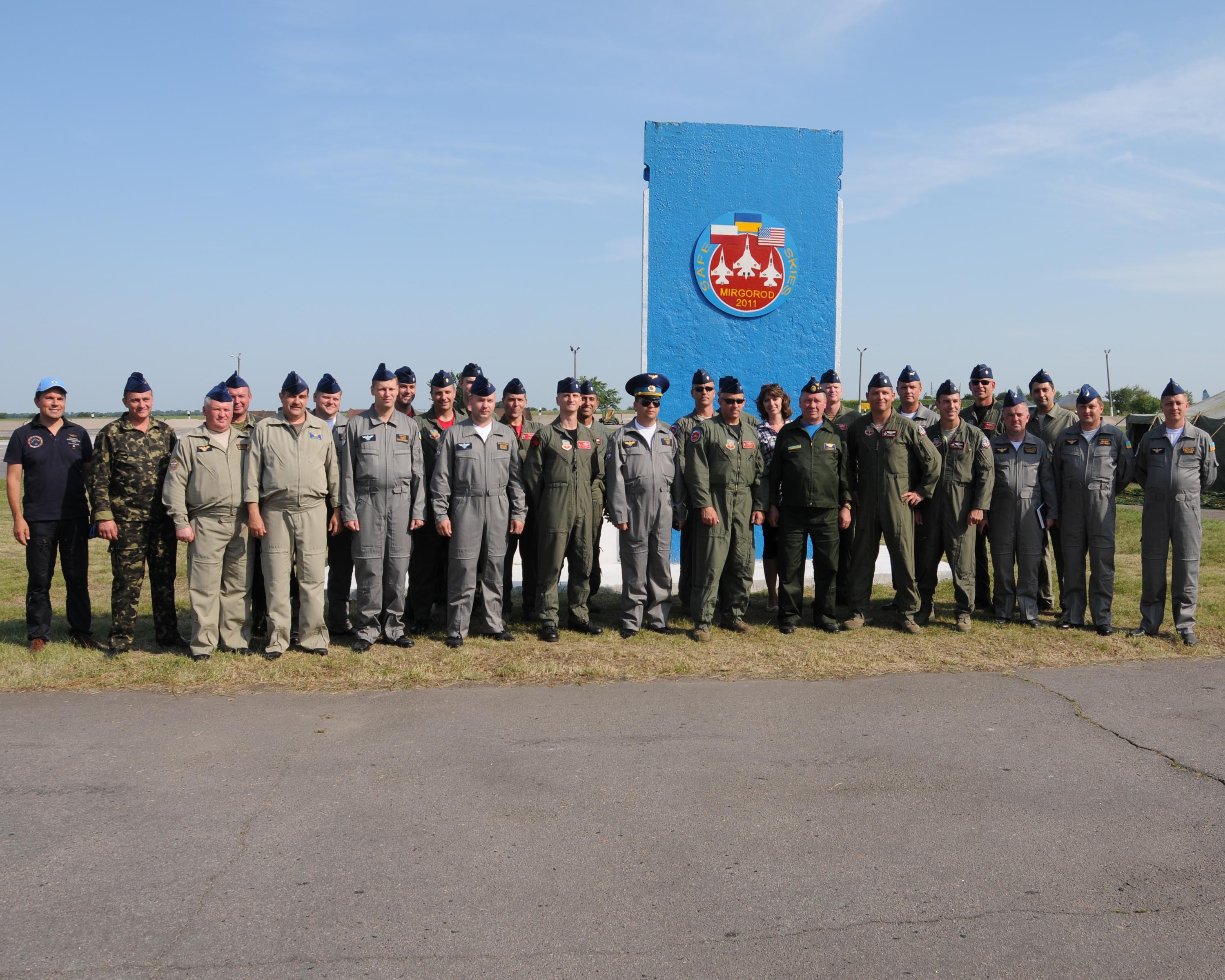
Ukrainian Air Force pilots pose with the California and Alabama Air National Guard

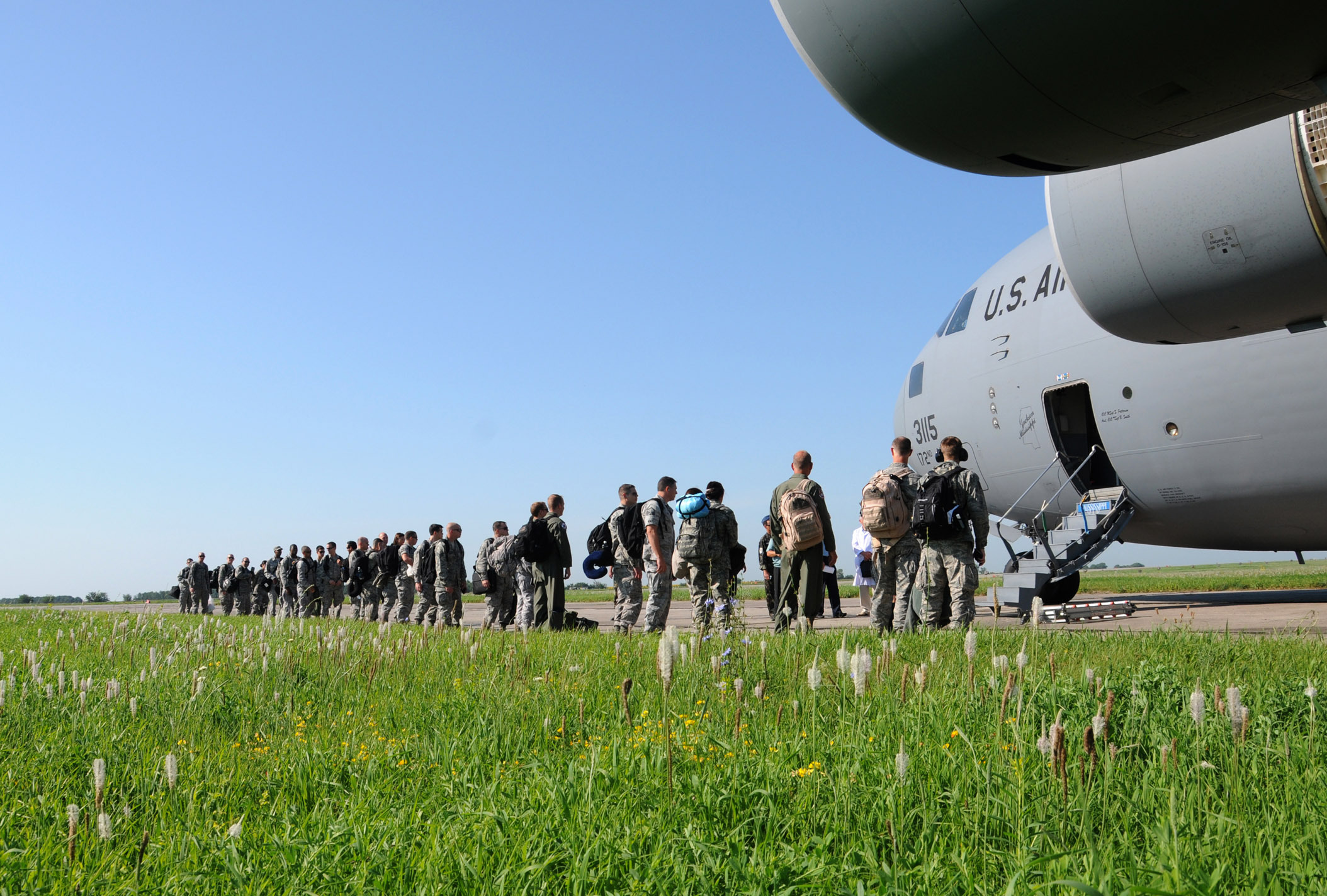
Members of the California and Alabama Air National Guard arrive in Ukraine to take part in Safe Skies 2011

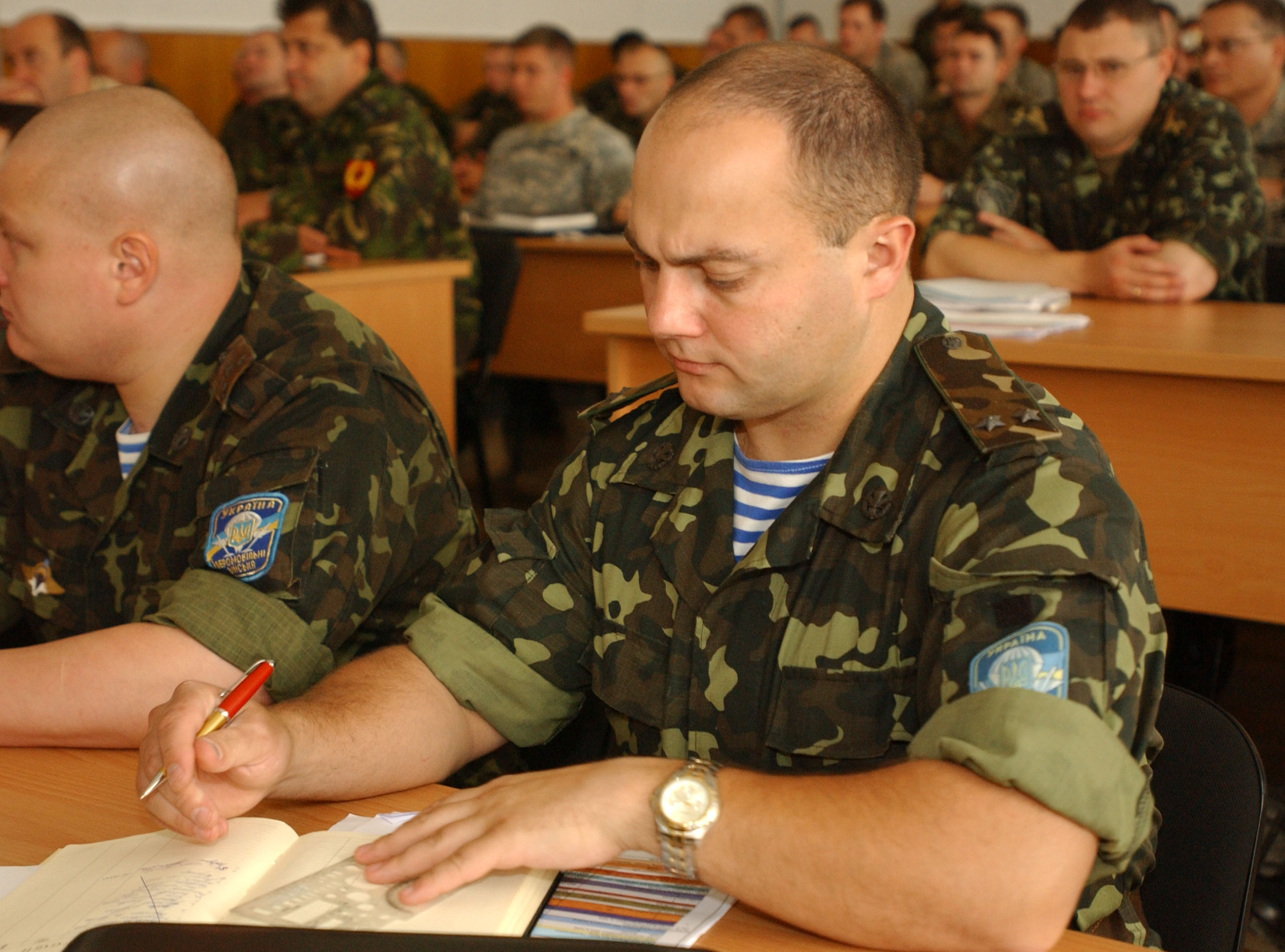
Ukrainian and Californian soldiers receive a briefing

== History ==
"The California SPP has been an extremely valuable tool for building lasting and meaningful relations with Ukraine and we look forward to its continued success. The SPP has provided California the opportunity to demonstrate the capabilities of our state's military around the world." - MG William Wade II, former Adjutant General, California National Guard

California partnered with Ukraine in 1993 as it emerged from the Cold War, unsure about its relationship with the United States. The program has helped Ukraine develop its own military and civilian capacities for security, emergency management and organization. The foundation of their cooperation has been built upon exercises like PEACE SHIELD and RAPID TRIDENT. California and Ukraine have trained together is these multinational exercises, hosted by Ukraine, for over 15 years. This partnership will transition to SABER GUARDIAN in 2014 and beyond.

While not seeking to enter NATO, Ukraine is committed to all NATO deployments and achieving NATO interoperability through development of Rapid Reaction Forces. The EU has been seeking a closer relationship by moving beyond regional cooperation toward gradual economic integration and deepening of political cooperation; however, a strategic EU trade agreement is currently on hold due to selective prosecutions. Ukraine is currently trimming military forces by 30% as part of a new Strategic Defense Initiative. In 2012, a new Minister of Defense and Chief of Defense were appointed.

In 2011, California participated in the single largest Air National Guard exchange in the partnerships history. Members of the California Air National Guard travelled to Mirgorod Air Base, Ukraine to conduct a two-week training exercise called SAFE SKIES 2011. A squadron of six Fighting Falcon F-16's from the Air National Guard lead the multinational Air Superiority exercise, which was designed to prepare Ukraine for real world missions it would face during EUROCUP 2012. California and Ukraine had been planning SAFE SKIES 2011 for over 3 years and its execution helped strengthen bonds between these former enemies of the Cold War. During the exercise, more than 60 air sovereignty mock intercepts took place using Ukrainian Su-27s and MiG-29s, and American and Polish F-16s. The exercise laid the foundation for a SAFE and SECURE EUROCUP Tournament as well as future training opportunities with Ukraine.

In 2012, Californian and Ukrainian Soldiers participated in six joint engagements, including international exchanges in cyber defense, CBRNE (Chemical, Biological, Radiological, Nuclear, Explosive) Response, maintenance, and NCO/Officer roles and relationships. California also supported the multinational exercise "Rapid Trident" hosted in Ukraine with participation from 14 partner nations. Since 2000, Californian and Ukrainian Soldiers have participated in over 330 Military-to-Military events.

The California National Guard has made humanitarian assistance a consistent facets of every deployment. During Deployments, the California National Guard has provided the following support to children and families across Ukraine; provided school and art supplies and sports equipment to schools in Mirgorod and Starichy, volunteered at orphanages in the Kyiv and Lviv regions, and helped with school renovations and painting in the Lviv region.

== Focus ==
The focus for 2013 and beyond includes: NCO Roles and Organizational Maintenance, English Language Training, Strategic Airlift Interoperability, Human Resources and Personnel Management, EURO Atlantic Interoperability, Humanitarian Assistance, Development of the European Union (EU) Battle Group, and the TRILATERAL Brigade (from Lithuania/Poland/Ukraine).
