= California State Guard =

- California State Guard
- Active: 1846–present
- Country: United States
- Allegiance: California
- Type: State defense force
- Role: Provide an adequately trained and organized State military reserve force under the exclusive control of the Governor
- Size: 900+
- Part of: California Military Department
- Nickname: CSG
- Motto: "Answer the Call!"
- Engagements: Mexican–American War American Civil War; Indian Wars; Spanish–American War; World War I (home front) World War II (home front)
- Website: calguard.ca.gov

Commanders
- Commander-in-Chief: Governor Gavin Newsom
- Adjutant General: Major General, ARNG Matthew P. Beevers
- Commanding General: Brigadier General (CA) Larry Adams
- Command Sergeant Major: Command Sergeant Major (CA) Rebecca Wolkenhauer

Insignia
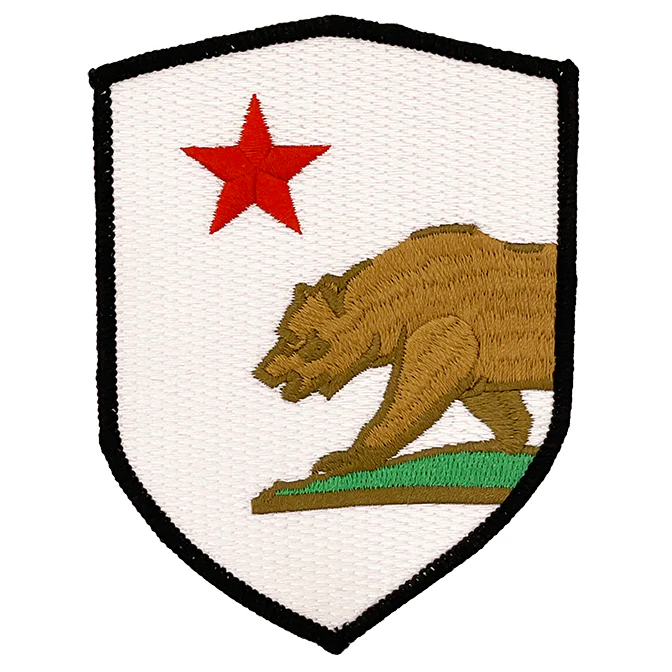
- Shoulder sleeve insignia (full color)

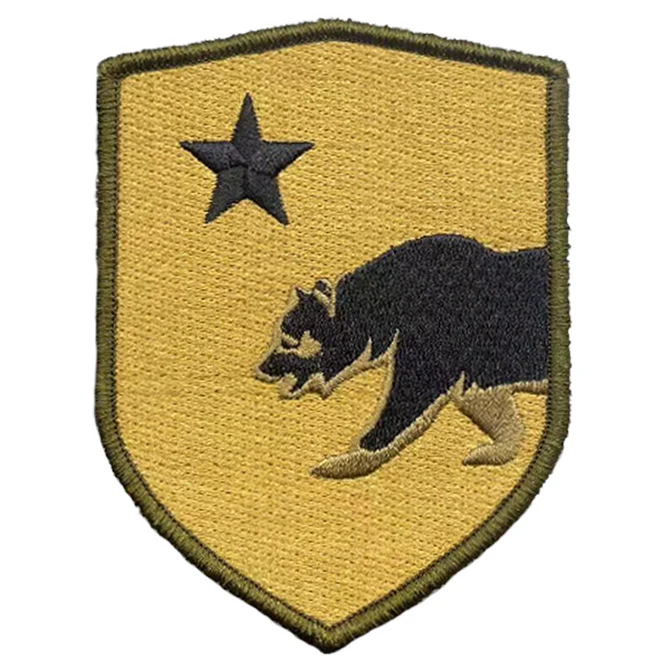
- Shoulder sleeve insignia (subdued)

- Beret flash

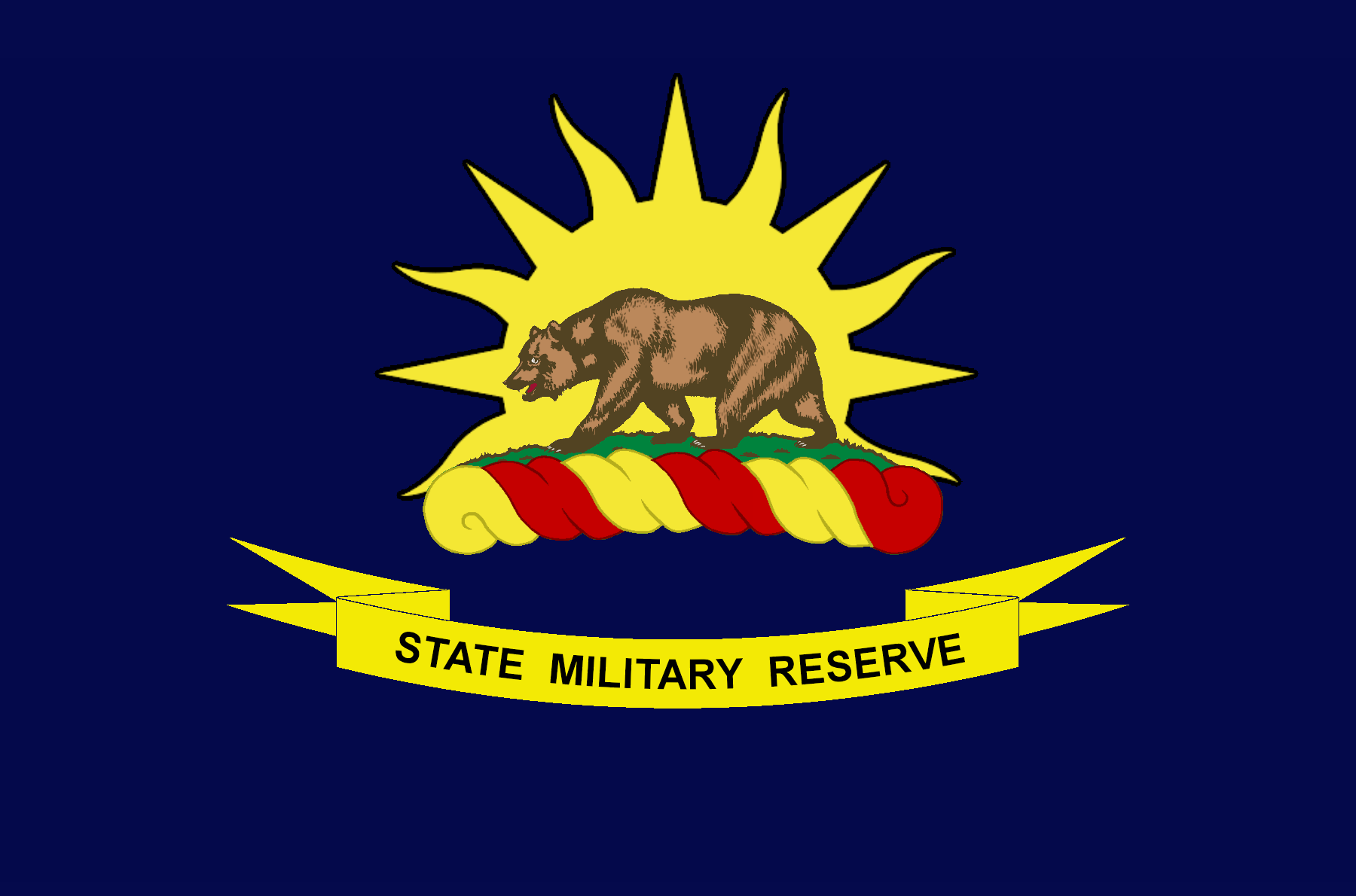
- Flag

The California State Guard (CSG) (formerly the California State Military Reserve) is a military unit which provides assistance and training to the California National Guard and is a state defense force of California. The CSG is a reserve force that supports the state missions and federal readiness of the Army and Air National Guard. CSG service members often come from all branches of the United States Armed Forces and are citizens with essential skills. Many CSG service members are fully integrated with Army National Guard and Air National Guard units, and hold full-time state active duty status through the California Military Department.

== Organization ==
The California State Guard is authorized under the provisions of the Title 32, United States Code, Section 109(c) and the California State Military Reserve Act (codified in the California Military and Veterans Code). It has legal standing as part of California's Active Militia. Activations are mandatory at times and service members are covered under the Uniformed Services Employment and Reemployment Rights Act (USERRA) as enacted by California state law (7 MVC 394 et. seq. and 566). Employers are required to comply with these laws when service members are called to Emergency State Active Duty (ESAD). Each service member is subject to the Uniform Code of Military Justice (UCMJ) per CMVC § 560.

== Members and recruiting ==
All citizens over the age of 18 and possessing a high school diploma or GED may apply for enlistment. Military veterans and those with special skills which materially contribute to the National Guard are of particular interest.

CSG service members are normally considered uncompensated state employees, although when called to Emergency State Active Duty (ESAD), they become compensated at the same rate as their National Guard counterparts. Many CSG service members are full-time State Active Duty (SAD).

== Training and qualifications ==
Training is administered by the Joint Training Command (JTC). The JTC conducts training year round and trains an average of 475 service members per training year.

The JTC provides training, including mission rehearsals, of individuals, units, and staffs using joint service doctrine and tactics, techniques, and procedures (TTPs) to prepare joint forces or joint staffs to respond to strategic, operational, or tactical requirements that are considered necessary to execute their assigned or anticipated missions. All JTC School Houses utilize the Train, Assess, and Counsel method when conducting training.

Any MOS, awards, medals, or badges earned in federal service transfer to the CSG. Depending on rank and time since separation, previous rank also transfers. CSG service members are held to the same regulations and training requirements for promotion as their National Guard counterparts.

All new members must attend the Basic Training Course (BOC). New members without prior military experience must attend Initial Entry Training (IET), a three-month Asynchronous Learning online course where members report to a student learns the fundamentals of the CSG. They are given monthly homework and E-Learning tasks to strengthen their knowledge and train how to interact with the chain of command. Each month new materials are released and students are exposed to another element of becoming a proficient member of their Unit and the CSG. Members are required to maintain physical fitness standards, done on their own time.

Other schools are available to service members who want to promote to their next rank. These include the NCOA (Noncommissioned Officers' Academy), OCS (Officer Candidate School), OTA (Officer Training Academy), and WOTA (Warrant Officer Training Academy). The NCOA has four levels: BLC (Basic Leadership Course: E4–E5), ALC (Advanced Leadership Course: E5–E6), SLC (Senior Leadership Course: E6–E8), and SMA (Sergeants Major Academy: E8–E9). These courses are broken into four or five residential phases at Camp San Luis Obispo. In every course, work is done utilizing a blended learning model (E-Learning and In-person Instruction).

While prior military members retain any Military Occupational Specialty (MOS) previously held, non-prior service members have no MOS qualification. Members with civilian qualifications that meet or exceed standards for a particular MOS are used as Subject Matter Experts (SME) to train their Army/Air Guard counterparts. An example of this is the firearms training team, which is responsible for administering weapons training throughout the California National Guard.

== Units ==
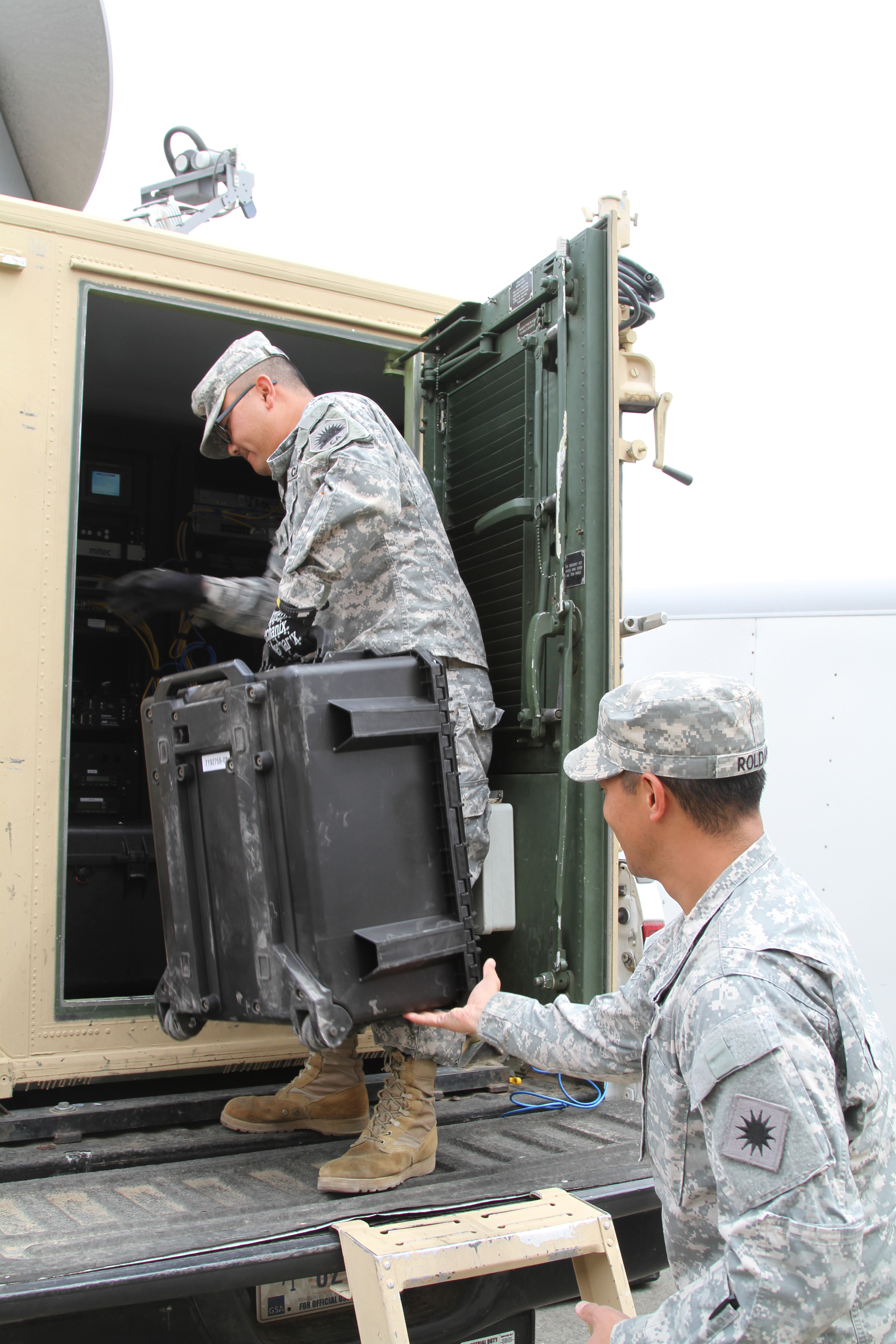
Sgt. Tien Quach and Sgt. Jason Roldan load equipment into an Incident Commander's Command Control and Communications Unit (IC4U).

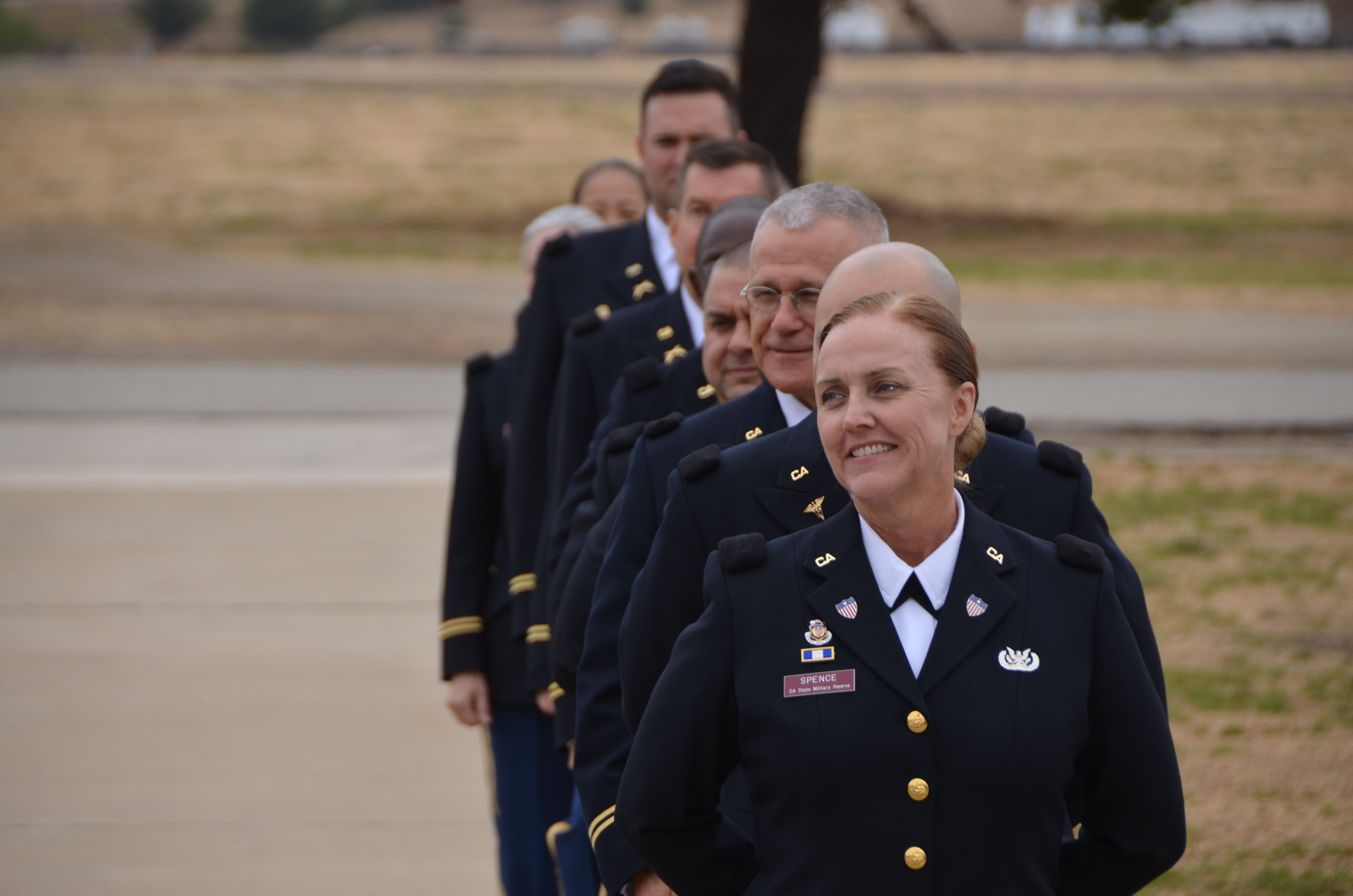
California State Guard officer candidates wait to be commissioned as officers.

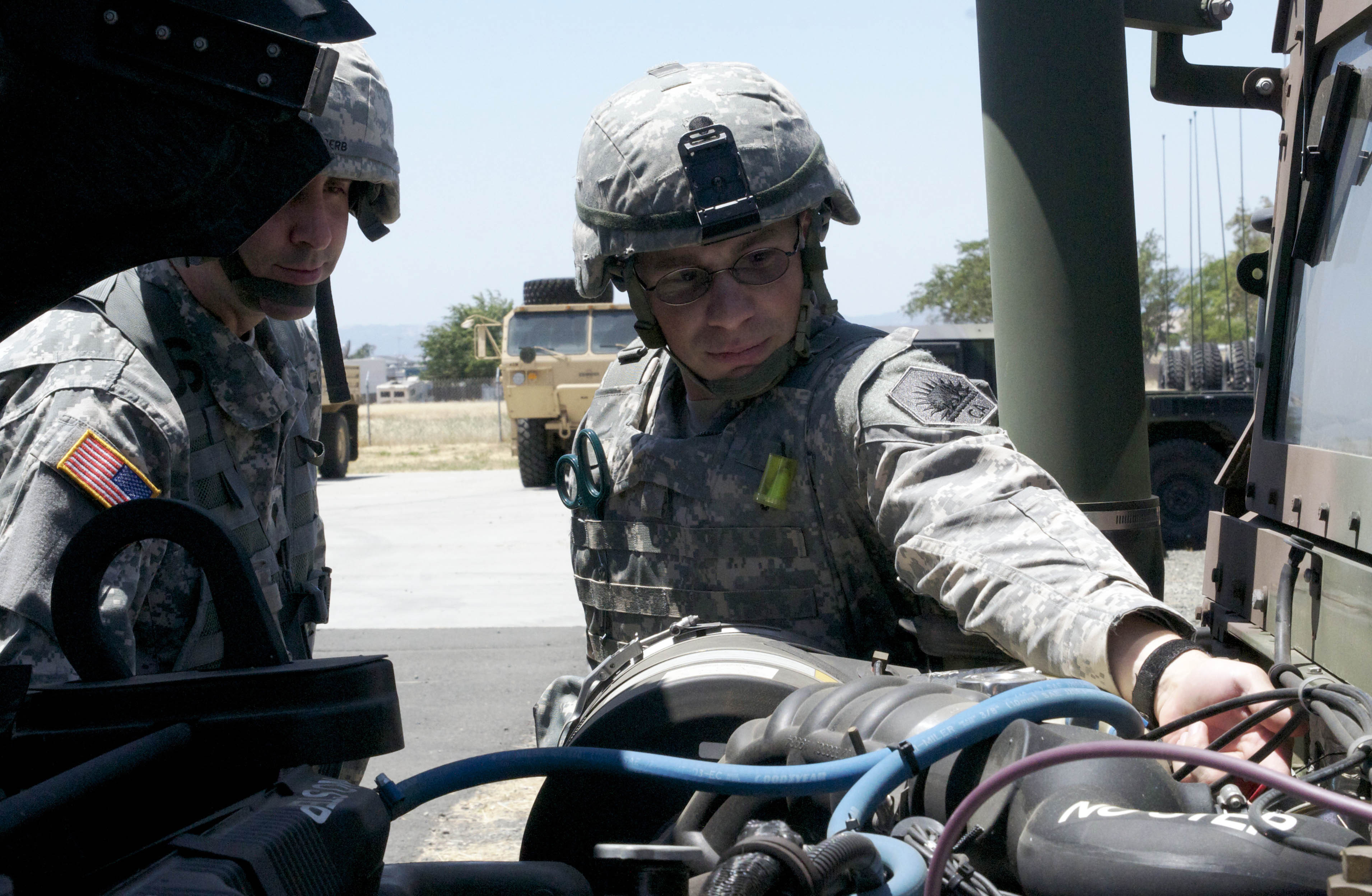
WO1 Joshua Zollo, a firefighter who serves with Alpha Company, 1st Special Troops Battalion, Regional Support Command-North, checks under the hood of a Humvee.

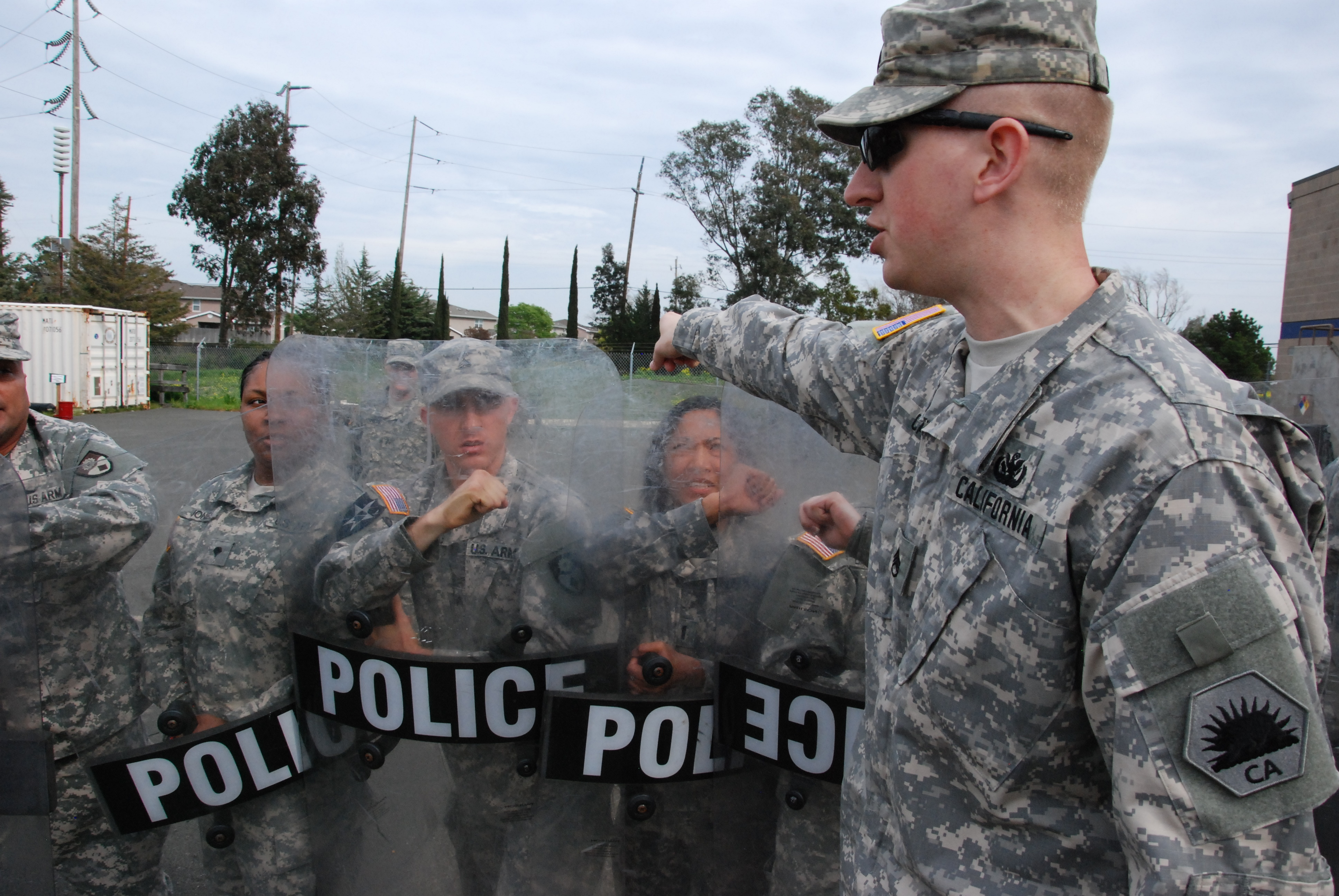
Staff Sgt. Andrew Cater, the acting First Sergeant of Alpha Company, Regional Support Command-North, participates in crowd control training.

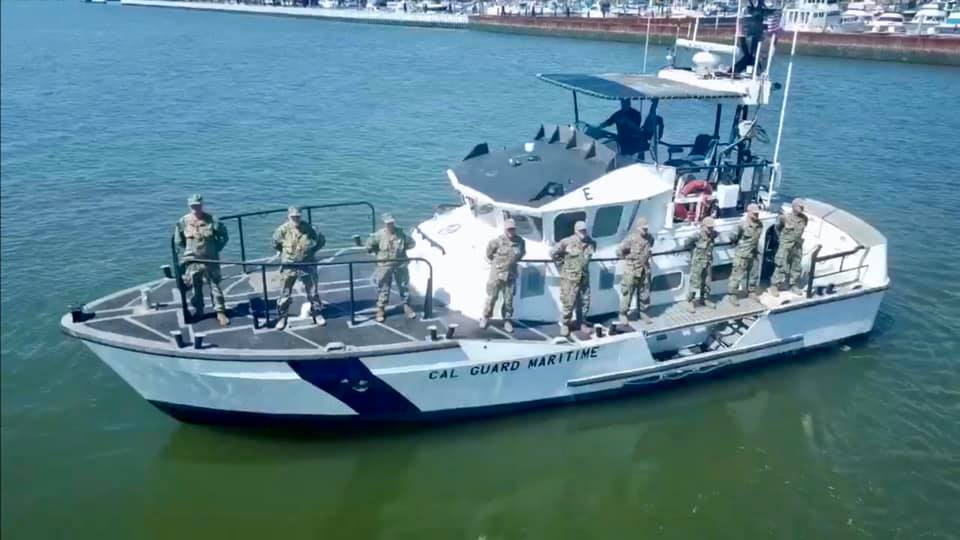
CSG's MCC One (47 foot patrol boat) received the Command Excellence Award of 2020–21 in Maritime Operations and Training.

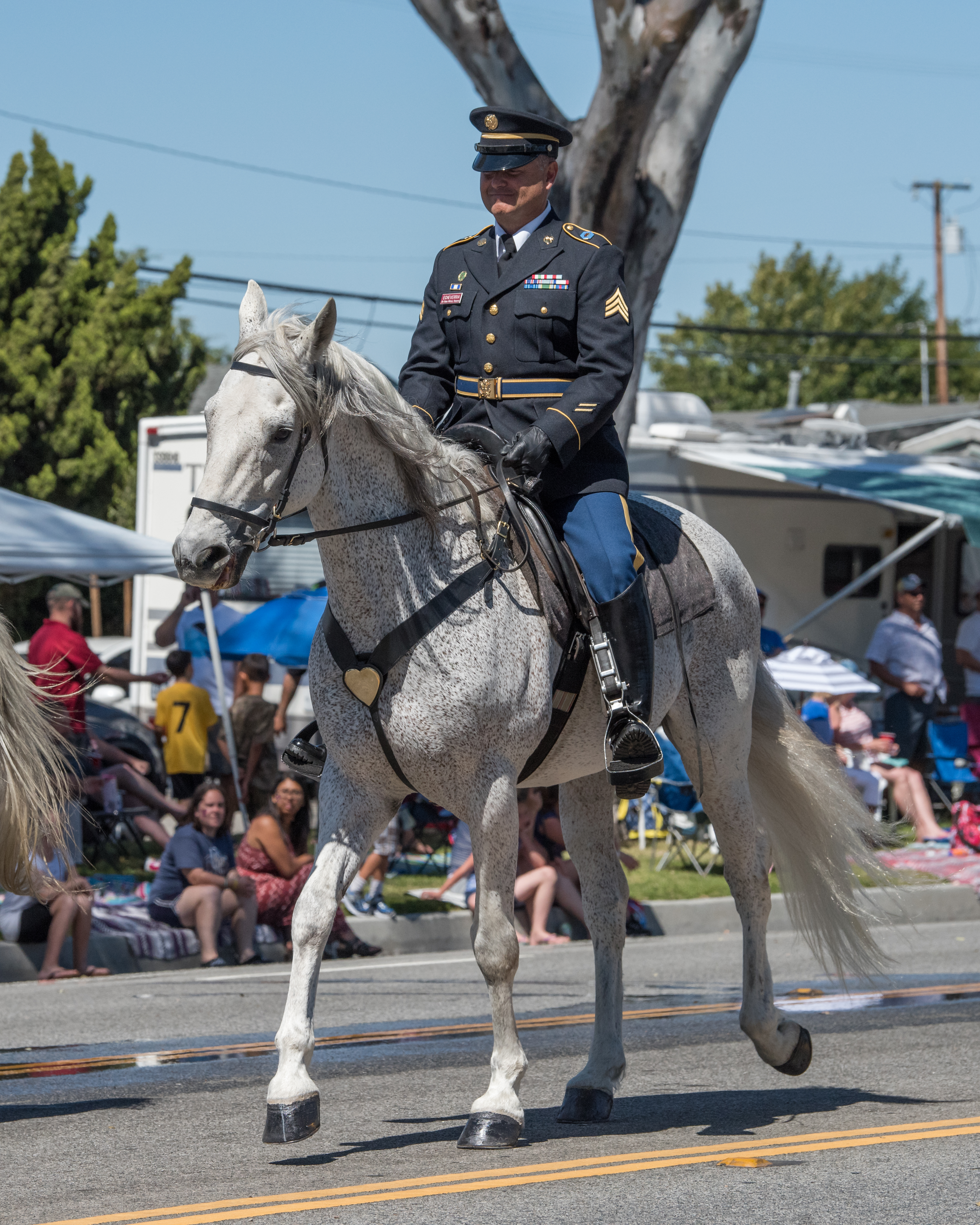
A member of the 26th Cavalry Support Regiment rides in the 58th Annual Torrance Armed Forces Day Parade.

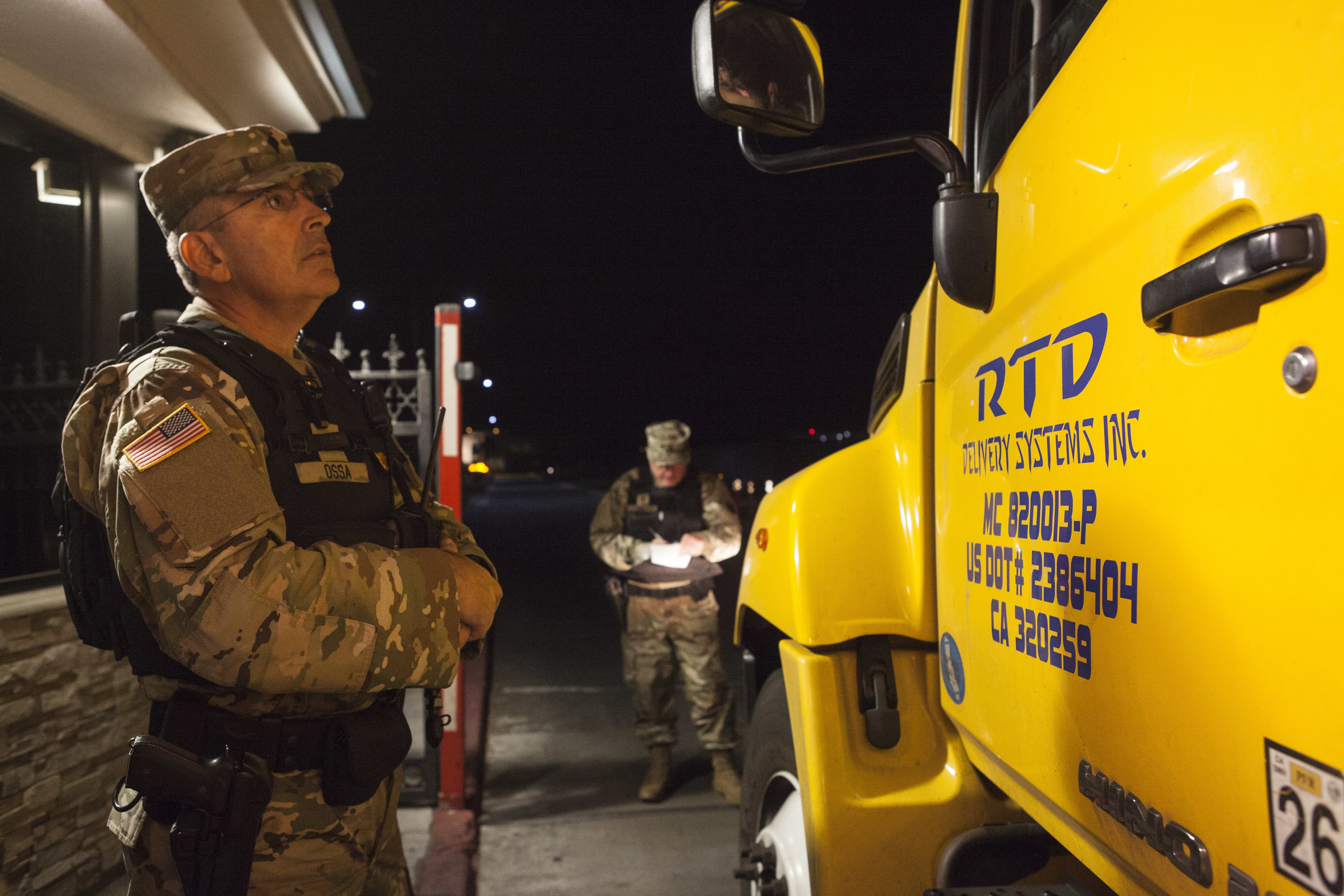
Staff Sgt. Juan Ossa, of the Installation Support Command, works the security gate at Joint Forces Training Base, Los Alamitos.

Many CSG service members are fully integrated with Army and Air Guard units. Members of standalone CSG units stay within the CSG's command structure.

=== Army Component ===
The Army Component is the largest section of the organization. Members serve in aligned or standalone units. Aligned units are directly connected to an Army National Guard unit. For example, the 40th Infantry Division of the CA Army National Guard is the CNG parent unit to the CSG's 40th Infantry Division Support Detachment.

=== Air Component ===
The Air Component are service members assigned to Air National Guard units. The Air Component has members stationed around the state including 163rd Attack Wing, 146th Airlift Wing, 129th Rescue Wing, 144th Fighter Wing, and 195th Wing (Cyber).

=== Maritime Component ===
On 18 March 2017, the CSG established the Maritime Support Command (MARSCOM) under the command of CAPT M. Hanson, with SCPO E. Anderson as the MARSCOM Senior Enlisted Advisor, in a ceremony aboard the decommissioned WWII-era carrier USS Hornet. MARSCOM personnel previously wore USN NWU III uniforms, however as of August 2024, their uniforms regulations were changed as part of the CSG-wide uniform policy changes set in place by Adjutant General Matthew P. Beevers. They now wear OCP uniforms with silver-on-black name and branch tapes, while retaining their USN-style rank insignia.

=== Emergency Response Command ===
The Emergency Response Command (ERC) is a former CSG command which served as the agency's rapid response force. It was previously commanded by Lieutenant Colonel Brian Rodgers. The ERC and all other units under it were officially decommissioned in early 2024 as part of a CSG-wide restructuring effort ordered by Adjutant General Matthew P. Beevers that saw standalone CSG units being decommissioned and their personnel reassigned directly under active California National Guard units as dedicated support detachments.

Team Shield was the CSG's dedicated Security Forces (SECFOR) unit. The unit was designed to protect critical infrastructure, military installations, government buildings, and assist civil authorities during times of emergency. Their training mainly focused on setting up and maintaining Access Control Points (ACPs), evacuation checkpoints and procedures, and riot control. Team Shield also worked with Team Blaze on fire missions providing access control and assisting local authorities with evacuation orders. Many of their personnel were prior or active law enforcement and armed security guards. Most Team Shield personnel were reassigned under the California Army National Guard's 49th Military Police Brigade upon the decommissioning of the unit.

Team Blaze was the CSG's dedicated firefighting and search and rescue unit, and was the United States' first dedicated military firefighting strike team. Officially founded in 2019 by Captain Matthew Epstein, they saw major action on the Dixie Fire where they were credited with saving the life of a California Army National Guard soldier who suffered heat stroke on the fire line. Team Blaze worked with Cal Fire as a Type 2 Hand Crew.

In October 2021 the Search and Rescue Detachment (SARDET), once a dedicated unit under the ERC, was decommissioned and folded into Team Blaze, forming the Search and Rescue Platoon (SAR Platoon). Team Blaze would subsequently be activated on two search and rescues missions, one smaller-scale search and recovery mission in San Luis Obispo County in February 2022, and one high-profile activation in June 2022 in McCloud, CA to assist in search and rescue efforts to locate missing cyclist Terrell Lamont Knight. The SAR Platoon was dissolved in early 2024 following a change in the commander's intent to focus solely on firefighting.

In 2022 the unit received five Cal OES Type 6 Fire Engines forming an engine strike package, however these were later relinquished back to Cal OES by the order of Adjutant General Matthew P. Beevers, who wanted the unit to remain focused on hand crew duties and search and rescue.

In 2024 as part of a part of a CSG-wide restructuring effort, Team Blaze was decommissioned and its personnel were reformed under Joint Task Force Rattlesnake as the Rattlesnake Support Detachment. Their most recent fire activation was in August 2024 for the Park Fire. As of March 2024 the unit's commanding officer was changed to Captain John A. Sheneman, who previously served as the executive officer under Captain Matthew Epstein.

=== Joint Medical Command ===
The California State Guard established the Joint Medical Command (JMC) on 18 July 2019. The JMC had the responsibility of overseeing CSG medical personnel as they perform their mission of keeping California's military and citizens healthy. The JMC provides military leadership to doctors, nurses, surgeons, and technicians.

=== Legal Support Command ===
The Legal Support Command (LSC) is a joint command of the CSG composed of Judge Advocates (JAGs, military attorneys), warrant officer legal administrators, enlisted paralegals, and other personnel in staff and support roles. CSG JAG's provide a full range of legal services to the Army Guard, Air Guard, State Guard, and Youth and Community Programs. CSG JAG's also provide critical legal assistance to service members and their families, which has included protecting deployed service members from civilian job loss, foreclosure, and repossession. JAG's typically work at National Guard armories or installation legal offices throughout the state.

== Drills ==
Unit Training Assemblies (UTAs, also referred to as "drills") are one weekend each month. Some units require longer drills depending on their mission and aligned units. The entire CSG also is required to participate in an annual muster each October to ensure that all service members are meeting basic height, weight, and medical requirements, as well as to ensure that their paperwork and certificates are up-to-date in the event of an activation.

== Uniforms ==
CSG service members were previously authorized the same uniforms as their federal counterparts (Army, Air Force, Navy) with state insignia. Awards from prior military service may be worn. All CSG service members must purchase their uniforms. A yearly $125 uniform allowance is authorized for all service members who maintain 100% drill attendance in a twelve-month period.

CSG service members are eligible for federal and state military awards and may wear previously awarded military awards and decorations. On occasion CSG have been awarded skill badges from other state defense forces, like jump schools, or cyber and drivers course.

As of August 2024, uniforms regulations were changed as part of the CSG-wide uniform policy changes set in place by Adjutant General Matthew P. Beevers. CSG service members now wear standard OCP uniforms with silver-on-black name and branch tapes, a standardized CSG shoulder patch on the left arm, and a California flag on the right arm. Service members wear the rank insignia of their respective component, with Army Component wearing US Army rank insignia, Air Component wearing US Air Force rank insignia, and Maritime Component wearing custom US Navy rank insignia on an OCP hook-and-loop rank tab similar to those worn by the other components. No changes were made to formal or mess dress uniform regulations.

== Emergency Activations ==
- 2017: CSG service members were activated to assist during winter storms resulting in mudslides and flooding, and the Mendocino Complex Fire and the Carr Fire in 2017.
- 2018: CSG service members were activated to assist with evacuations during the Camp Fire in Butte County in 2018.
- 2019: CSG service members were activated to assist with evacuations and rescue operations during high water levels at the Russian River in Guerneville. CSG service members were instrumental in emergency management operations after the Ridgecrest earthquake in July 2019.
- 2020–2022: CSG service members were activated for the COVID-19 pandemic. Additional activations occurred for civil unrest, humanitarian aid, and wildfires.
- June 2022: Service members from Team Blaze were activated on a search and rescue mission in McCloud, CA to assist in search and rescue efforts to locate missing cyclist Terrell Lamont Knight.
- August–September 2024: Service members from across the CSG were activated to assist in efforts to combat the Park Fire in Butte County and Tehama County.

=== Fire response ===
CSG service members are routinely activated for California's wildfire seasons.

A large-scale operation in October/November 2007, over 100 CSG members were activated with their National Guard counterparts to fight wildfires.

The CSG had a vital role in the 2008 "Operation Lightning Strike," when Governor Arnold Schwarzenegger activated over 2,000 troops to help firefighters.

== See also ==
- Military of the United States
- National Guard
- California Military Department
  - California National Guard
    - California Army National Guard
    - California Air National Guard
- California Military Academy
