= Hugh M. Burns =

American politician

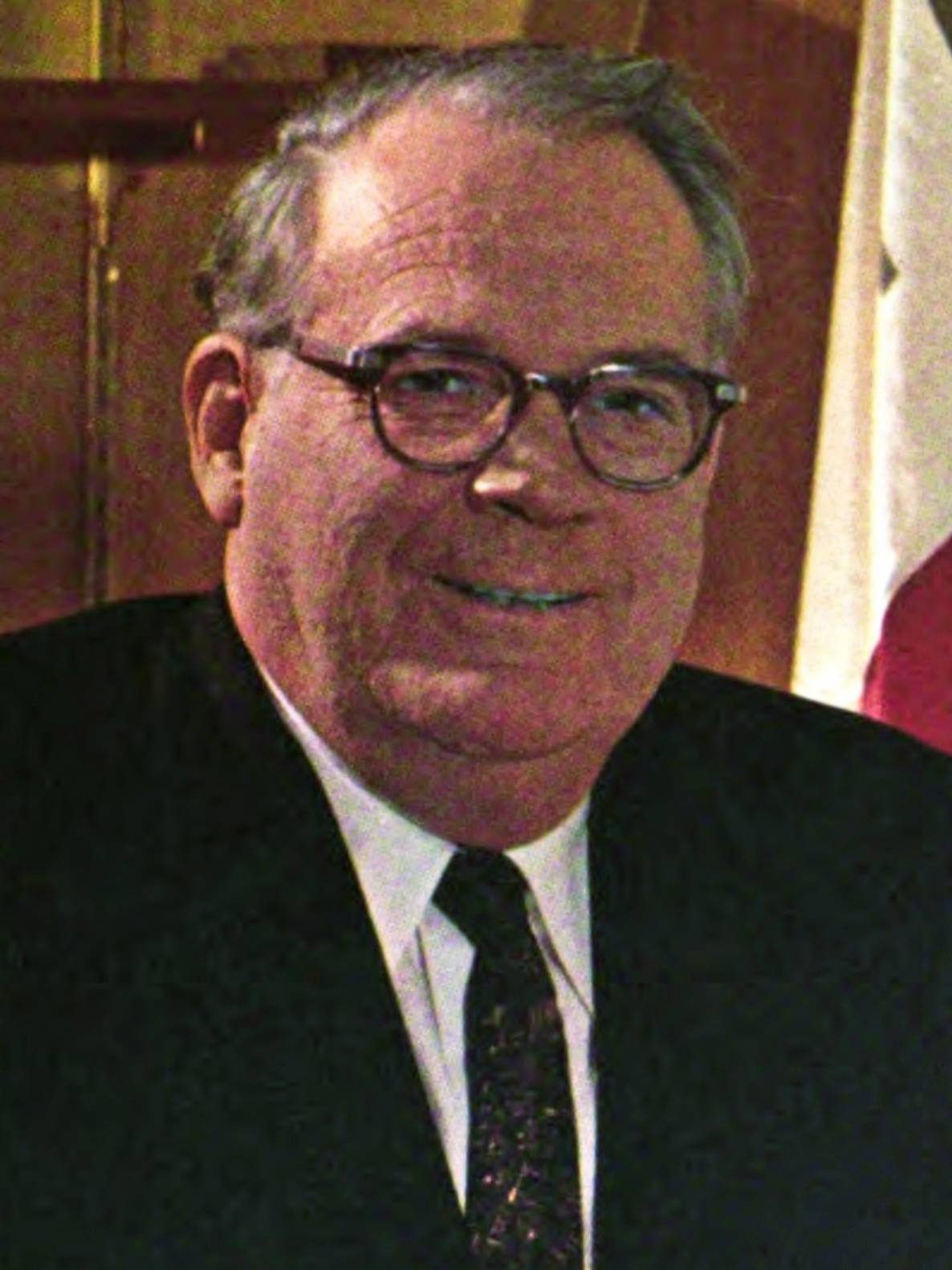
- Official portrait, 1967

41st President pro tempore of the California State Senate
- In office January 5, 1957 – May 14, 1969
- Preceded by: Ben Hulse
- Succeeded by: Howard Way

Member of the California State Senate
- In office January 4, 1943 – January 4, 1971
- Preceded by: Ray W. Hays
- Succeeded by: George N. Zenovich
- Constituency: 30th district (1943–1967); 16th district (1967–1971)

Member of the California State Assembly from the 36th district
- In office January 4, 1937 – January 4, 1943
- Preceded by: Claud Minard
- Succeeded by: Charles Lester Guthrie

Personal details
- Born: February 25, 1902
- Died: November 26, 1988 (aged 86) Sacramento, California, U.S.
- Party: Democratic
- Spouse: Wilma Burns

Hugh Morrison Burns (February 25, 1902 – November 26, 1988) was an American politician. He served as a Democratic member for the 36th district of the California State Assembly. He also served as a member for the 16th and 30th district of the California State Senate.

== Life and career ==
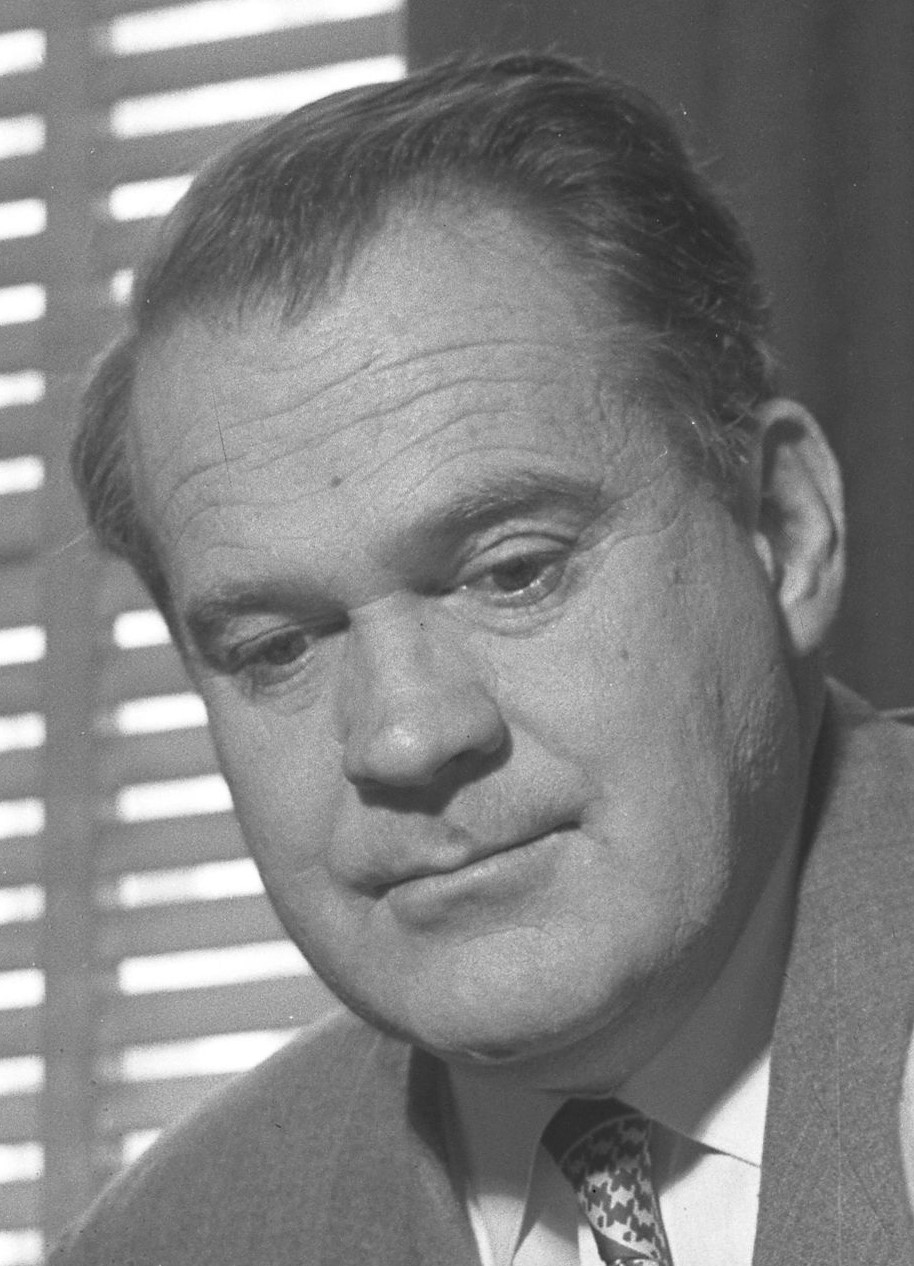
Burns in 1947.

Burns was a mortician.

In 1937, Burns was elected to represent the 36th district of the California State Assembly, serving until 1943. In the same year, he was elected to represent the 30th district of the California State Senate, serving until 1967, when he was elected to represent the 16th district, serving until 1971.

Burns died in November 1988 at his home in Sacramento, California, at the age of 86.
