= Samuel W. Backus =

American politician (1844–1930)

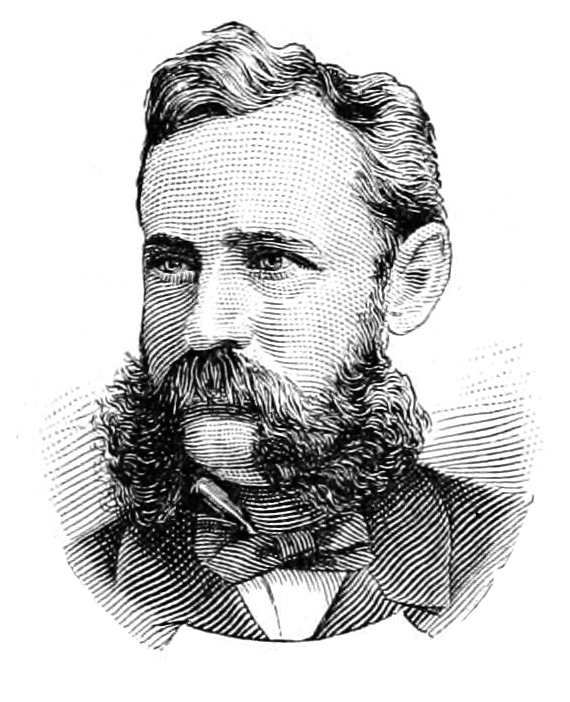
- Born: November 6, 1844; Pine Plains, New York, US
- Died: March 10, 1930 (aged 85); San Francisco, California, US

Samuel Woolsey Backus (6 November 1844 in Pine Plains, New York – 10 April 1930 in San Francisco, California) served in the California legislature and during the American Civil War he served in the US Army. From January 9, 1880 – July 1, 1882 he served as Adjutant General of the California National Guard.

== Biography ==
"The Knights Templar Furor," a cartoon published in The Wasp mocking Backus and other wealthy San Franciscans, August 25, 1883. Backus later bought the magazine.

Backus was born in 1844 in Poughkeepsie, New York, and moved to California in 1852, where he was educated at the public schools of Sacramento. He served in the Civil War, joining the Army of the Potomac in 1862. He was made a Second Lieutenant at 19, and served with distinction until the close of the War. He served in the Modoc wars of 1865–1866, and for a time commanded at Fort Bidwell. Retiring from the Army he entered the civil service, first in the Internal Revenue Department, and afterward in the Custom House, in 1867 he gave up the public service for private business, and became a commission merchant, and for ten years did an extensive trade. In 1878, he was elected to the State Legislature from the same district with the late Hon. John F. Swift. He was appointed Adjutant-General by Governor George C. Perkins in 1880, and was a most efficient officer, reorganizing the State militia thoroughly. He was San Francisco's Postmaster, under President Chester A. Arthur's administration ('82-86), and made such an enviable record as an administrator of public affairs that President Benjamin Harrison re-appointed him in 1890.

In 1889 he purchased the San Francisco Wasp, an illustrated weekly magazine of news and satire. He also served as U.S. Immigration Commissioner in San Francisco, appointed by President William Howard Taft in 1911 and reappointed by Governor Hiram Johnson in 1913, serving until 1915.
