= Theron R. Perlee =

Theron R. Perlee or Per Lee, (1824–1894), lawyer, soldier, 49er, politician and judge in the territory and early state of California.

Theron R. Perlee was born in Chenango County, New York. He studied law before he enlisted as a lieutenant in Company C of the 1st Regiment of New York Volunteers that came to California during the Mexican–American War. While there he commanded the removal of the garrison of Sutters Fort to San Francisco. After the Regiment was disbanded, he set up a law practice in San Francisco. In February 1849, he was elected as the Justice of the Peace for San Francisco, his first political office. Perlee also edited The Placer Times from June 19, 1849, to August 25, 1849. He resigned so that he could run for the territorial assembly as its representative from Monterey in the fall of 1849.

Perlee, a Democrat, relocated to Santa Cruz so that he could represent his district more effectively. Perlee was elected to the California Legislature in 1849 and served in the California State Assembly from December 1849 until April 1850. Perlee served as the first State assemblyman of Santa Cruz County in the first session of the California State Legislature. Perlee resigned in April 1850 when the Legislature appointed him as the first Adjutant General of California from April to October 1850.

On September 31, 1850, Judge William Blackburn, the first Santa Cruz County judge, resigned his office and Theron R. Perlee became the presiding judge in October of that year. Judge Perlee was succeeded by Henry Rice in June, 1854.

Perlee later returned to New York to practice law. He married Mary F. Shinn January 7, 1857, in Highland County, Ohio. In 1875, he was living in Baltimore, Maryland. He died March 20, 1894, in Togus, Kennebec County, Maine and was buried in Rock Creek Cemetery, Washington, D.C.
