= California National Guard =

Component of the U.S. National Guard of the state of California

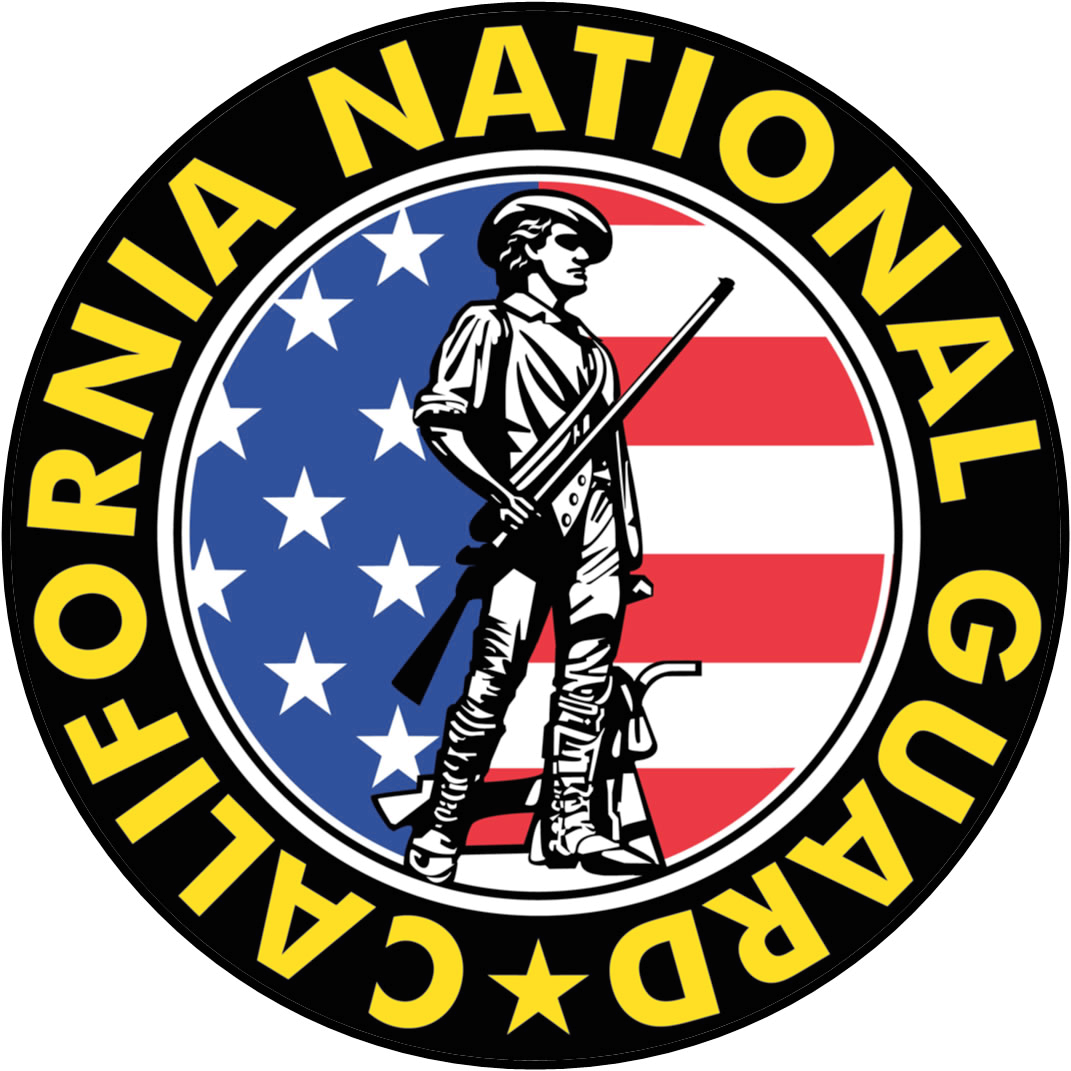
- Seal of the California National Guard
- Active: July 27, 1849
- Country: United States
- Allegiance: California
- Branch: United States Army; United States Air Force
- Type: National Guard
- Role: Organized militia
- Size: 24,000 (as of 2025)
- Part of: National Guard Bureau; California Military Department
- Headquarters: 10601 Bear Hollow Drive, Rancho Cordova, California 95670
- Nicknames: CalGuard; CNG

Commanders
- Commander in Chief (Title 10 USC): President of the United States (when federalized)
- Commander in Chief (Title 32 USC): Governor of California
- Adjutant General: MG Matthew P. Beevers
- Senior Enlisted Leader: CMSgt Lynn E. Williams

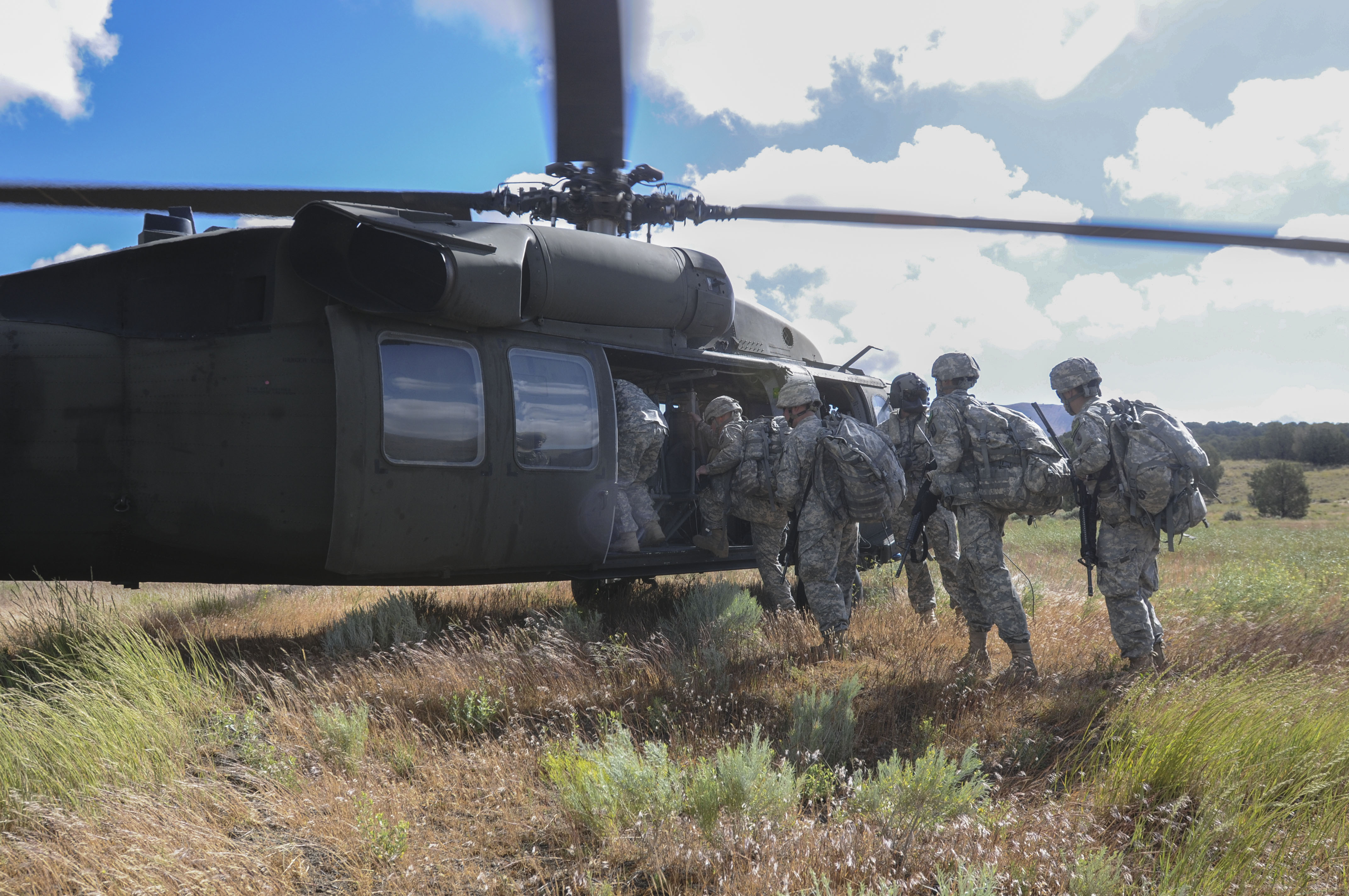
California National Guardsmen boarding a UH-60 Black Hawk military helicopter during training at Camp Williams, Utah in 2014

The California National Guard (Cal Guard) is part of the National Guard of the United States, a dual federal–state military reserve force in the state of California. It has three components: the California Army National Guard, California Air National Guard, and California State Guard. As of 2025, the California National Guard comprises approximately 24,000 personnel, making it one of the largest National Guard forces in the United States.

Since 2001, members of the California National Guard have been deployed overseas more than 38,000 times. Thirty-one California Guardsmen have died while serving overseas in support of operations in Iraq, Afghanistan, Kuwait, and Guantanamo Bay.

The Constitution of the United States specifically charges the National Guard with dual federal and state missions. When under the control of its state governor, National Guard functions range from limited actions during non-emergency situations to full scale law enforcement of martial law when local law enforcement officials can no longer maintain civil control. The National Guard may be called into federal service in response to a call by the president or Congress.

When National Guard troops are called to federal service, the president serves as Commander-In-Chief. The federal mission assigned to the National Guard is: "To provide properly trained and equipped units for prompt mobilization for war, national emergency or as otherwise needed."

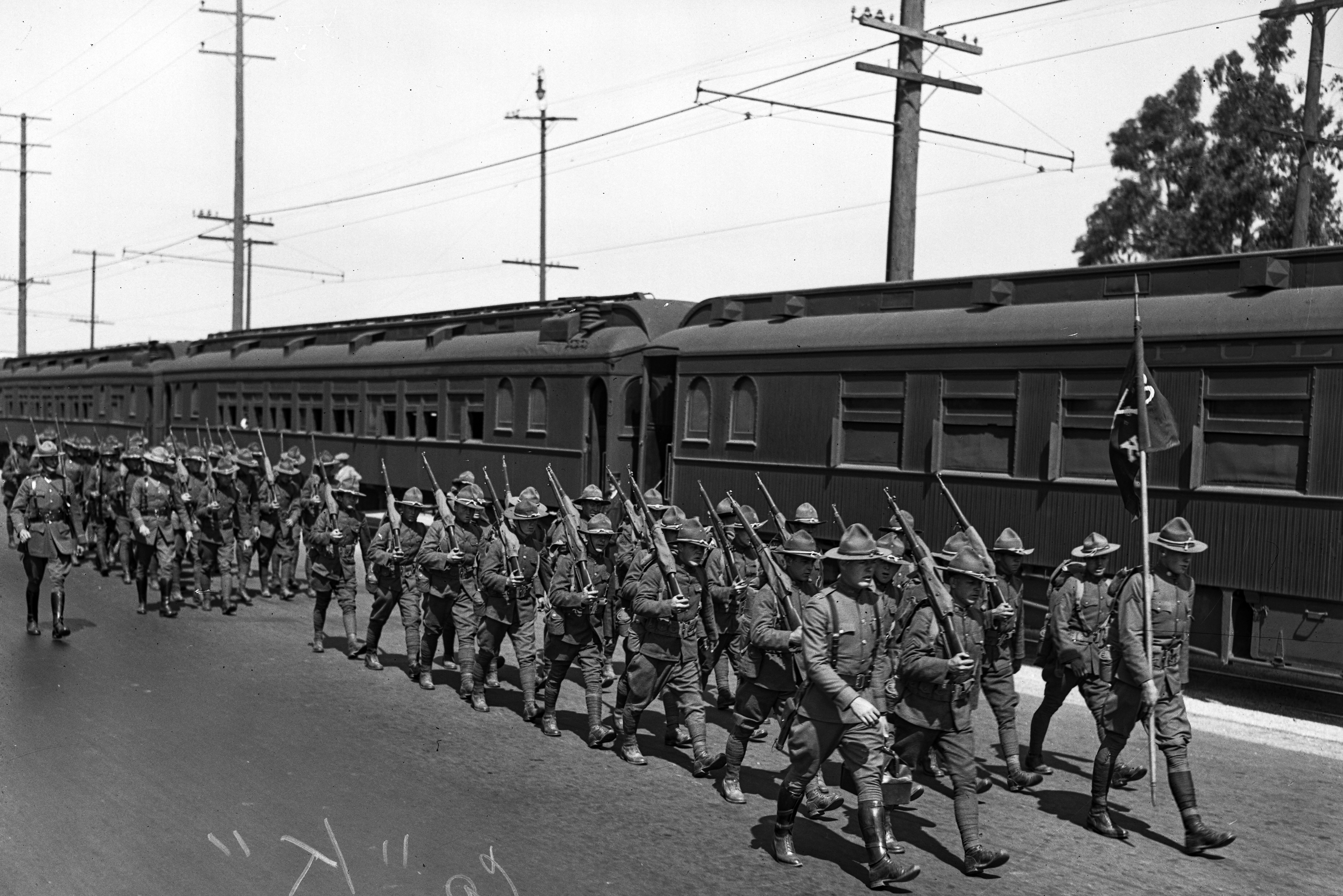
Troops of the 160th Infantry Regiment of the California National Guard arriving in Los Angeles, August 17, 1924

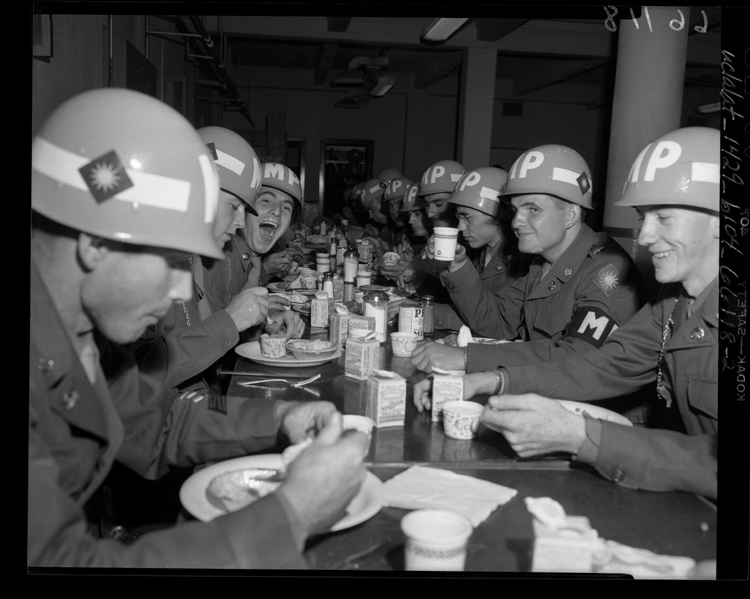
California National Guard MPs, 1950

The governor of California may call individuals or units of the California National Guard into state service during emergencies or special situations. The state mission of the National Guard is: "To provide trained and disciplined forces for domestic emergencies or as otherwise provided by state law."

== 2025 federal deployment and legal challenge ==
In June 2025, the California National Guard became the subject of a high-profile legal and political dispute when President Donald Trump issued a memorandum federalizing up to 4,000 Guard members and deploying approximately 700 U.S. Marines to Los Angeles during protests following federal immigration raids. Governor Gavin Newsom strongly opposed the move, asserting that it exceeded presidential authority under Title 10 and was unnecessary given local law enforcement's control.

On June 9, the State of California filed suit in the Northern District of California, Newsom v. Trump, seeking to block the deployment via a temporary restraining order. The lawsuit contends the executive order violated 10 U.S.C. § 252, the Tenth Amendment, and the Posse Comitatus Act.

On June 12, 2025, Judge Charles Breyer of the Federal District Court in San Francisco issued a 36-page ruling, returning control of the National Guardsmen back to Newsom. The second paragraph of the ruling reads:

At this early stage of the proceedings, the Court must determine whether the President followed the congressionally mandated procedure for his actions. He did not. His actions were illegal—both exceeding the scope of his statutory authority and violating the Tenth Amendment to the United States Constitution. He must therefore return control of the California National Guard to the Governor of the State of California forthwith.

== Components ==
- California Army National Guard (CA ARNG)
- California Air National Guard (CA ANG)
- California State Guard (CSG)

== Military Museum Command ==
The California State Guard Military Museum Command’s interim state museum is Camp Roberts Historical Museum and is provided as a public service by the California Military Department.

== Adjutant General ==
Major General Matthew P. Beevers serves as the Adjutant General of California since he was appointed by California Governor Gavin Newsom on August 1, 2022.

=== Adjutants General of California ===
Name	Term start	Term end	Notes
Theron R. Perlee	April 12, 1850	October 5, 1850	
William H. Richardson	October 5, 1850	May 2, 1852	
William Chauncey Kibbe	May 2, 1852	April 30, 1864	
Robert Robinson	January 1, 1864	May 1, 1864	
George S. Evans	May 1, 1864	May 1, 1868	
James M. Allen	May 1, 1868	November 23, 1870	
Thomas N. Cazneau	November 23, 1870	December 21, 1871	
Lucius H. Foote	December 21, 1871	December 13, 1875	
Patrick F. Walsh	December 13, 1875	January 9, 1880	
Samuel W. Backus	January 9, 1880	July 1, 1882	
George B. Crosby	January 11, 1883	November 1, 1887	
Richard H. Orton	November 1, 1887	January 9, 1891	
Charles Carroll Allen	January 9, 1891	May 24, 1895	
Andrew W. Bartlett	May 24, 1895	December 23, 1898	
Robert L. Peeler	December 23, 1898	June 1, 1899	
William H. Seamans	June 1, 1899	January 3, 1902	Died in office
George Stone	January 13, 1902	February 15, 1904	
Joseph B. Lauck	February 15, 1904	January 7, 1911	
Edwin A. Forbes	January 7, 1911	June 18, 1915	Died in office
Charles W. Thomas Jr.	June 19, 1915	December 15, 1916	
James J. Borree	December 16, 1916	November 30, 1923	
Richard E. Mittelstaedt	December 1, 1923	January 5, 1931	Also served 1940–41
Seth E.P. Howard	January 6, 1931	June 26, 1935	Died in office
Paul Arndt	June 27, 1935	October 17, 1935	
Harry H. Moorehead	October 18, 1935	January 3, 1939	
Patrick J.H. Farrell	January 4, 1939	June 10, 1940	
Richard E. Mittelstaedt	June 10, 1940	March 3, 1941	Second term
Joseph O. Donovan	March 3, 1941	July 10, 1942	
Junnius Pierce	July 14, 1942	January 13, 1943	
Ray W. Hays	January 14, 1943	November 30, 1944	
Victor R. Hansen	December 27, 1944	April 28, 1946	
Curtis D. O'Sullivan	April 29, 1946	July 15, 1951	
Earl M. Jones	July 16, 1951	December 31, 1960	
Roderic L. Hill	January 1, 1961	January 1, 1967	
Glenn C. Ames	March 22, 1967	June 5, 1975	
Frank J. Schober	June 6, 1975	December 31, 1982	
Willard A. Shank	January 3, 1983	February 13, 1987	
Robert C. Thrasher	February 14, 1987	October 9, 1992	
Robert W. Barrow	October 10, 1992	December 31, 1992	
Tandy K. Bozeman	January 1, 1993	April 27, 1999	
Paul D. Monroe Jr.	April 29, 1999	March 2004	
Thomas Eres	March 2004	June 6, 2005	
John Alexander	June 7, 2005	August 1, 2005	
William H. Wade II	September 1, 2005	February 1, 2010	
Mary J. Kight	February 2, 2010	April 15, 2011	
David S. Baldwin	April 16, 2011	July 31, 2022	
Matthew P. Beevers	August 1, 2022	Present	

== Military academy ==
The California National Guard maintains the California Military Academy at Camp San Luis Obispo, which houses the state's Officer Candidate School (OCS) program. This academy trains qualified enlisted personnel, warrant officers, and civilians to become commissioned officers in the California Army National Guard.

Upon completion of Basic Combat Training (BCT), OCS cadets attend monthly drills for approximately 16 to 18 months, followed by a two-week annual training. Graduates are commissioned as Second Lieutenants in the Army National Guard.

== Accidents and incidents ==
In 1995, Shawn Nelson, a former US Army officer, entered a California National Guard armory undetected. He was able to start one of the tanks and he drove it around the streets of San Diego. After the incident, the San Diego mayor wrote a letter to the California Governor demanding an investigation into armory security.

== See also ==
- List of California State Militia Units 1850–60
- List of California State Militia civil war units
- California Military Department
- California State Guard
- California during World War II
