= Edwin Alexander Forbes =

American politician

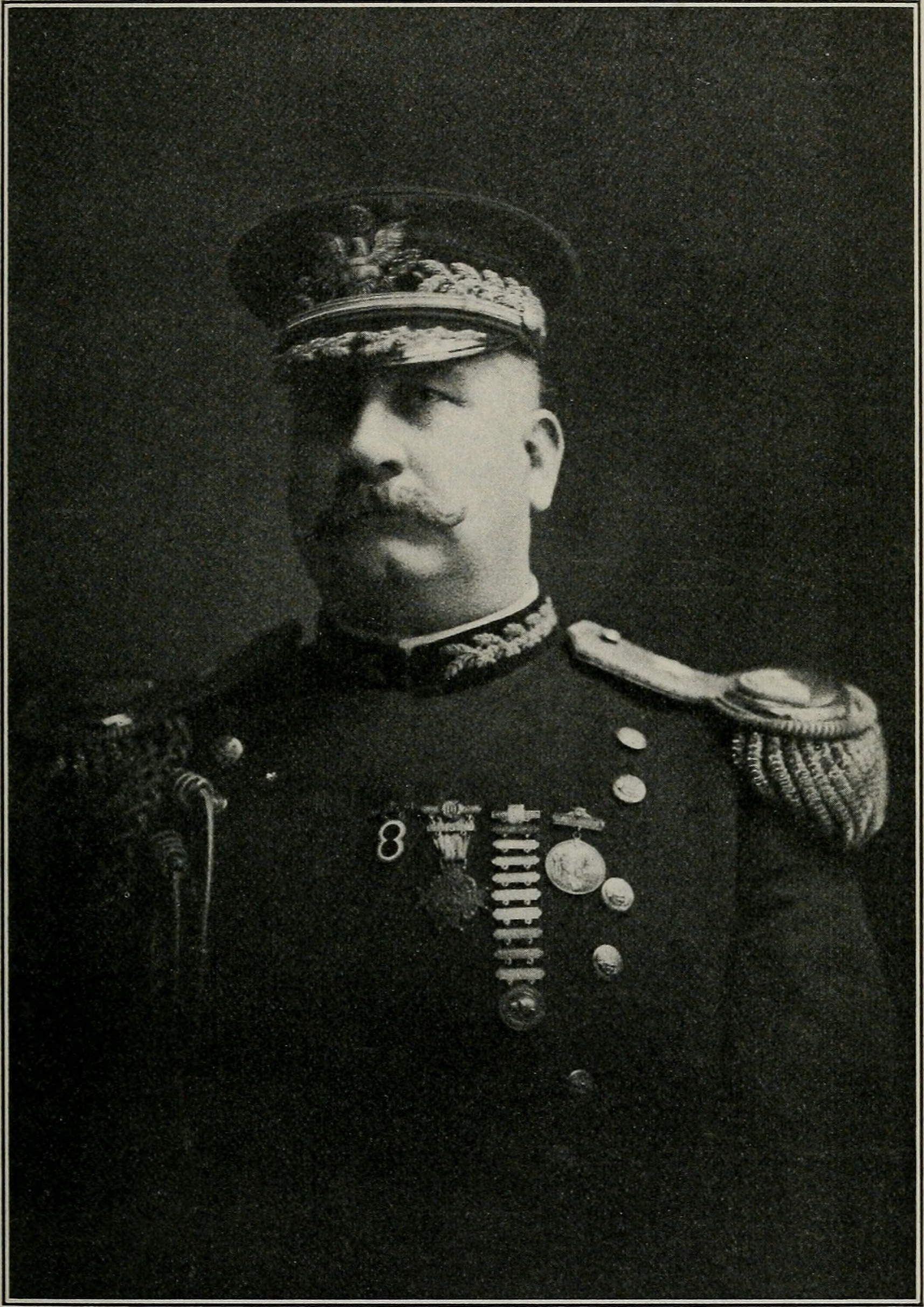
- Born: 1860
- Died: 1915 (aged 54–55)
- Occupation: Adjutant General
- Employer: California Cadet Corps 8th Infantry

Edwin Alexander Forbes (1860–1915), who served as the Adjutant General of California from 4 January 1911 to 18 June 1915, is known as the Father of the California Cadet Corps.

During his term of office he originated the idea of providing military training to young men in high schools. At that time the Legislature passed a comprehensive High School Cadet Law. This was the first instance in the United States, so far as is known, where an effort was made to organize statewide military training in the schools, under the supervision of the head of the state Military Department.

Forbes was born on 20 July 1860 near Brandy City, Sierra County. His paternal ancestors were soldiers for many generations in the Highland regiments of the British Army.

He grew up on his father's ranch in Yuba County, attending school and riding the ranges after stock. At 18, he obtained a first-grade certificate to teach school and taught for three years in Yuba County. When he reached 21, he took his savings and entered the law school of the state university. By teaching school during vacations, working as a harvest hand and clerking in a law office, he financed his education and graduated from Hastings College of the Law in May 1884.

Upon graduation, Forbes opened a law office in Marysville and, the same year, was elected as the district attorney of Yuba County, a position he held for four terms.

Forbes always took a prominent part in military affairs. He joined Company E, 1st Artillery, 4th Brigade, California National Guard, in 1879. Upon its reorganization in 1882, he joined Company C, 8th Regiment. He received a commission as captain from Gov. Henry Markham in 1894. When the regiment was merged into the 2d Regiment, Gov. James Budd commissioned him captain of Company D. He eventually attained the rank of brigadier general. He was chosen as Lieutenant colonel of the 2d California National Guard in 1896 and, with his regiment, he volunteered for service in the Spanish–American War.

About the same time, he received a commission as major of the 8th California Infantry, United States Volunteers. At Camp Barrett he was commander of the 3d Battalion and, after commanding at Benicia, he was transferred to the 1st Battalion, assigned to Vancouver Barracks. He commanded that post for a short while and was then detailed to the command of Angel Islands, where he had two companies of the 8th Regiment and one battery of heavy artillery in the Signal Corps. He was mustered out of service in 1899, but continued as a lieutenant colonel in the 8th Regiment of the National Guard.

Forbes had the reputation of being a crack shot. As captain of the Marysville company in 1895, he broke the world record for target shooting in competition with 50 men.

He played a leading role in the politics of his time, and was chairman of the Republican State Convention in Sacramento in 1900. He became owner of the Marysville Appeal, one of the oldest papers in Northern California, in 1905, and took an active role in water development in Yuba County and in agricultural affairs and fraternal organizations.

Forbes died on 18 June 1915 in San Francisco, while still serving as the Adjutant General. He was buried on 20 June 1915 at Holy Cross Catholic Cemetery in San Mateo County.
