= Ray W. Hays =

American politician

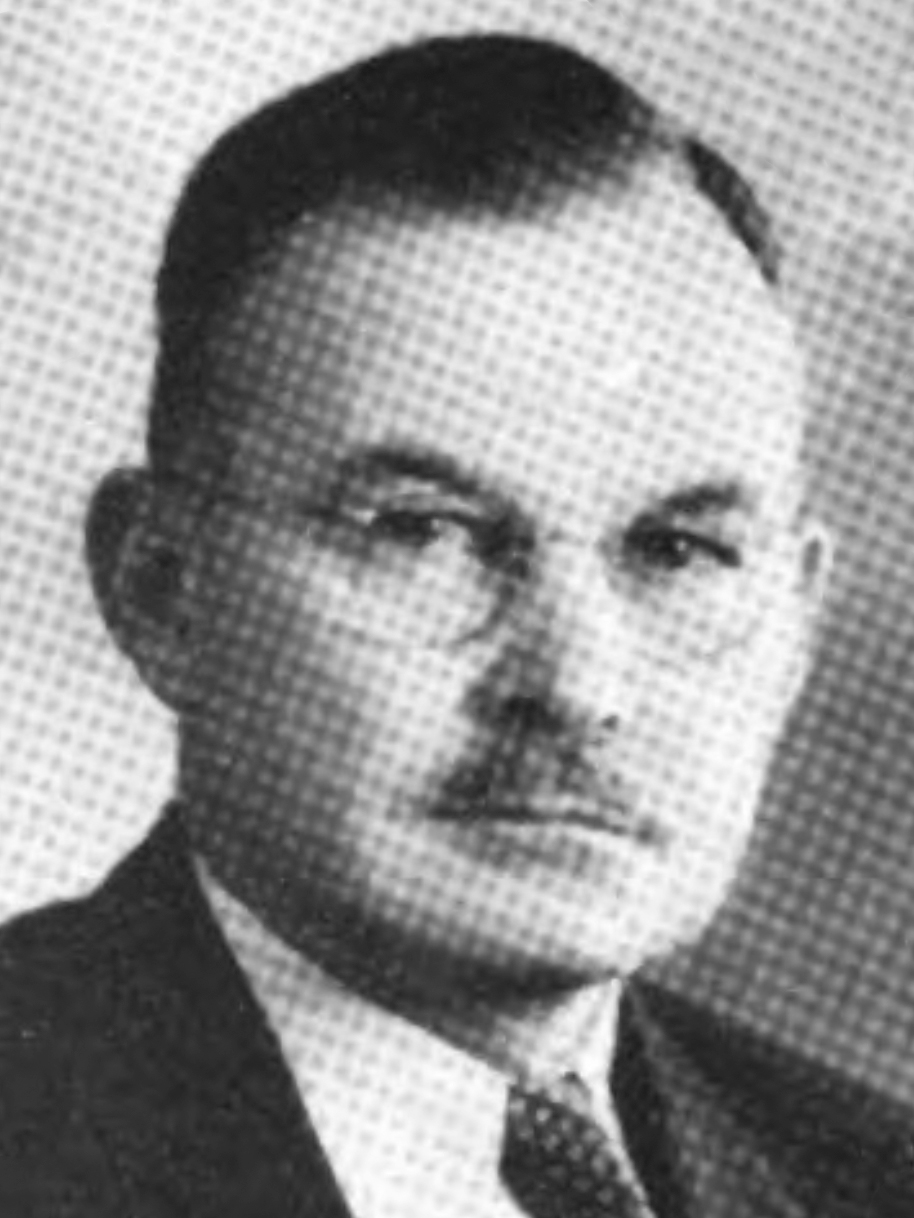

Member of the California Senate from the 30th district
- In office January 5, 1931 – January 4, 1943
- Preceded by: Ralph E. Swing
- Succeeded by: Hugh M. Burns

Personal details
- Born: June 14, 1889 Wisconsin, U.S.
- Died: April 5, 1976 (aged 86) Portland, Oregon, U.S.
- Party: Republican
- Children: 4

Military service
- Branch/service: United States Army
- Battles/wars: World War I

Ray W. Hays (June 14, 1889 – April 5, 1976) was a Republican state senator who served in the California legislature for the 30th District. During World War I he served as an officer in the American Expeditionary Force. While in the Senate, he served on the government efficiency committee. Hays is buried in Willamette National Cemetery in Portland, Oregon.
