= Matthew P. Beevers =

US General

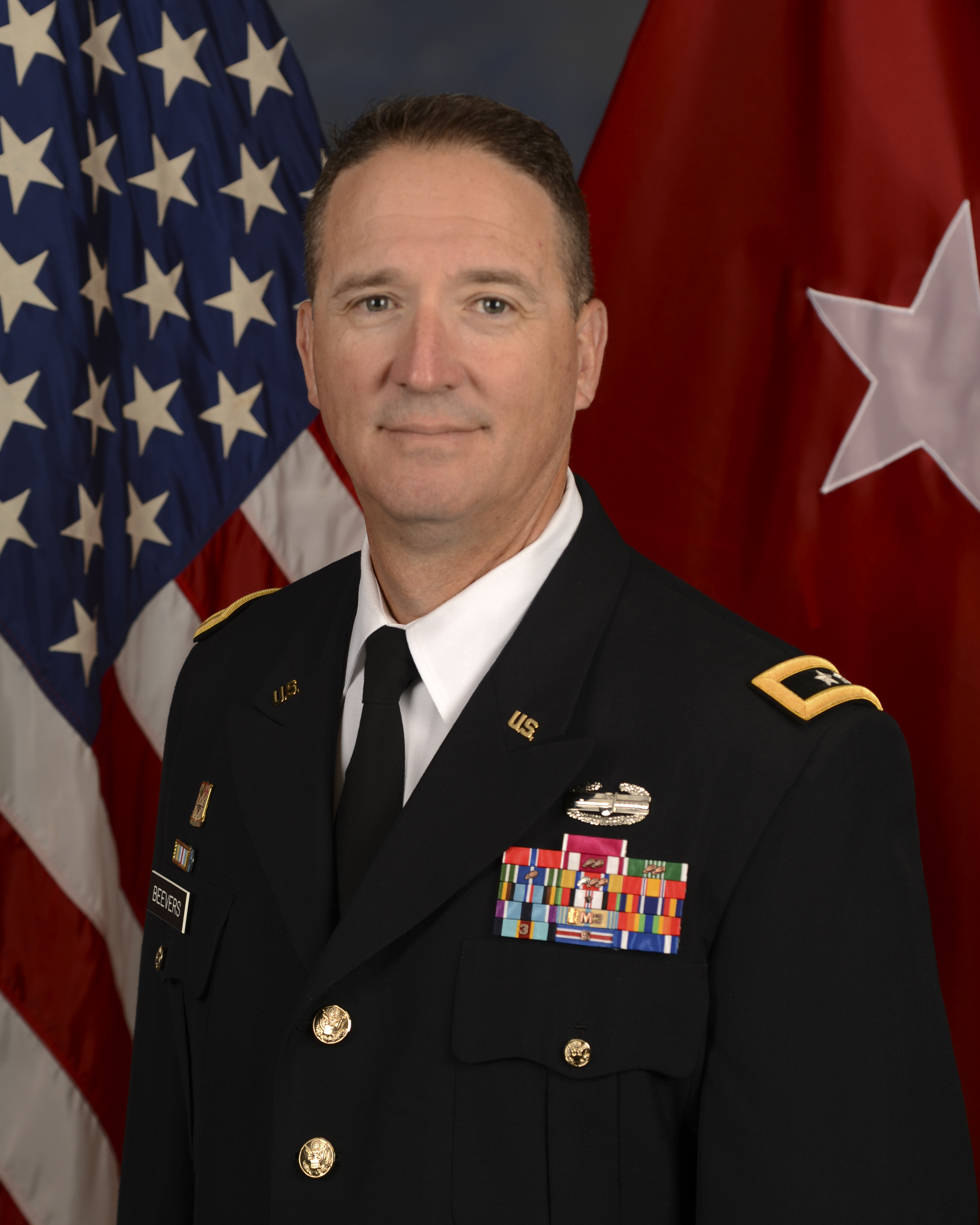

Personal details
- Born: June 1963 (age 63)
- Education: San Jose State University (BS); United States Army War College (MSS)

Military service
- Allegiance: United States
- Branch/service: United States Army
- Years of service: 1983-present
- Rank: Major General
- Unit: 49th Military Police Brigade; California Army National Guard
- Commands: California National Guard
- Battles/wars: See battles: Operation Garden Plot; Operation Joint Forge; Operation Iraqi Freedom; Operation Enduring Freedom

Matthew P. Beevers is an American military officer who is serving as a major general in the United States Army and also serving as the adjutant general of the California National Guard.

== History ==
Matthew P. Beevers was born in June 1963. He attended San Jose State University, and the United States Army War College. He was commissioned as a second lieutenant on the 21st of May 1983. He has served as the Adjutant General of the California National Guard since August 2022.
