= State Partnership Program =

Protocol used by the National Guard of the United States

United States National Guard State Partnership Program
- Origin: 1993
- Authorities: Title 10 (Armed Forces); Title 32 (National Guard); National Defense Auth. Act
- Partnerships: 88 (2022)
- CCMDs: USEUCOM; USOUTHCOM; USAFRICOM; USCENTCOM; USNORTHCOM; USINDOPACOM;
- Annual Activities: 900+ events (All of 2016)
- RSM Nations: 22 (May 2017)
- RSM Troops: 9700 (May 2017)

2026 world map of National Guard State Partnerships and date of conception

The State Partnership Program (SPP) is a joint program of the United States Department of Defense (DoD) and the individual states, territories, and District of Columbia. The program and the concept originated in 1993 as a simplified form of the previously established (1992) Joint Contact Team Program (JCTP). The JCTP aimed at assisting former Warsaw Pact and Soviet Union Republics, now independent, to form democracies and defense forces of their own. It featured long-term presence of extensive and expensive teams of advisory specialists. The SPP shortened the advisory presence to a United States National Guard unit of a designated state, called a partner, which would conduct joint exercises with the host. It is cheaper, has a lesser American presence, and can comprise contacts with civilian agencies. Today, both programs are funded.

The SPP is widespread. The JCTP is recommended when more extensive support is needed. Sometimes the names are interchangeable. A large share of originally JCTP activity was subsumed by the NATO Partnership for Peace (PfP) program made active in 1994. It prepares nations for membership in NATO. A typical path for a candidate has been SPP, PfP and then NATO. Once started, SPP activities appear to continue regardless of what other memberships a host nation may have. By nature the program creates close friends and allies.

Previously, and currently outside the program, the Guard was and is subject to a jurisdictional duality: it can be either Federally active or not. If inactive it is a reserve component only of the DoD. Its main function is as a state militia under the command of the Governor through the Adjutant General of the state or equivalent officer of the Territory or D.C. If active, it is entirely out of the jurisdiction of the state and under the DoD, which might or might not keep its original identity, but more likely plunders it for replacements or special units of the Regular Army or Air Force.

In the SPP, the State (or territory, etc.) and the DoD collaborate in the deployment of the unit, through the National Guard Bureau, and the Adjutant General of the State. The unit keeps its State identity. In the words of one source, it is "managed by the National Guard Bureau, but executed by the states." In that case there is collaboration between the state Adjutant General and the commander in the field.

The "partners" of the partnerships are the Guard units of various states and foreign nations that have requested and been granted partnerships. The program links National Guard units of U.S. States with partner countries around the world for the purpose of supporting the security cooperation objectives of the geographic Combatant Commands (CCMDs). It is not quite so cut-and-dried as pure security. There are quite a number of crisis relief and humanitarian activities.

== Legal basis for the program ==
=== Title 10 authorization ===
The deployment authorized by the SPP under the joint management of State and Federal governments can only be in the "State Partnership" relationship, which according to the current United States Code (U.S.C.) is defined as a "program of activities." The Secretary of Defense is authorized to establish it between the "military forces," the "security forces," or the "governmental organizations" designed to respond to disasters or other emergencies, and the "National Guard of a state or territory." The nature of the activities is that they must support United States "Security Cooperation" (SC) objectives.

A State Partnership is thus an agreement between the United States and a foreign government to conduct joint security operations with the United States National Guard. These are mainly training exercises. They may (or may not) lead to membership of the partner in regional defense organizations.

"For SPP events conducted overseas, National Guard members are typically placed in a duty status by orders issued under the authority of 10 U.S.C. § 12301," which is a list of various circumstances in which Secretary of Defense may issue an involuntary activation of the Guard as a Reserve Component of the DoD. The permission of the Governor may be required in some cases. "For SPP events conducted within the United States, National Guard members are placed in a duty status by orders issued under 32 U.S.C. § 502. This permits the participating members to receive appropriate military pay and benefits." 32 U.S. Code § 502 specifies that the uard must attend regular training exercises, for which they get paid.

In summary, the Guard is either activated for out-of-country activities or regularly trained within it. No special SPP legislation is required.

=== Statutory authority ===
The State Partnership Program is authorized under 10 U.S.C. § 341. Activities conducted under the program may also be carried out under:

- 10 U.S.C. § 1051 (Multilateral, bilateral, or regional cooperation programs: payment of personnel expenses) "authorizes the Secretary of Defense to pay the travel, subsistence, and similar personal expenses of defense personnel of developing countries in connection with their attendance at a multilateral, bilateral, or regional conference, seminar, or similar meeting," with certain restrictions.
- 10 U.S. Code § 321 (Training with friendly foreign countries: payment of training and exercise expenses), changed from 10 U.S.C. § 2010 (Combined Exercises), states "The armed forces under the jurisdiction of the Secretary of Defense may train with the military forces or other security forces of a friendly foreign country...."
- 10 U.S.C. § 401 (Humanitarian and civic assistance provided in conjunction with military operations) authorizes the DOD "to carry out humanitarian and civic assistance activities in host nations in conjunction with military operations," defined to include "medical, surgical, dental, and veterinary professionals ... construction of rudimentary surface transportation systems ... well drilling and construction of basic sanitation facilities ... rudimentary construction and repair of public facilities."
- 10 U.S.C. § 2561 (Humanitarian Assistance) authorizes the expenditure of humanitarian assistance funds for the "transportation of humanitarian relief and other humanitarian purposes...."
- 10 U.S.C. § 2249c, renumbered to § 345. Establishes the Regional Defense Combating Terrorism Fellowship Program (CTFP). This organization is described in a report to Congress: "The Regional Defense Combating Terrorism Fellowship Program (CTFP) was established to meet an emerging and urgent defense requirement to build partnerships in the struggle against violent extremism through targeted, non-lethal, combating terrorism (CbT) education and training. The CTFP directly supports DoD’s efforts by providing CbT education and training for mid- to senior-level international military officers, ministry of defense civilians, and security officials."
- "Section 1206 of the National Defense Authorization Act (NDAA) for Fiscal Year 2006 ... provides the Secretary of Defense with authority to train and equip foreign military forces for two specified purposes — counterterrorism and stability operations — and foreign security forces for counterterrorism operations. Section 1206 authority now extends through FY2017."
- Nunn–Lugar Cooperative Threat Reduction Program provides funding related to preventing weapons proliferation and other activities.

== Financial basis for the program ==
Expenses for the SPP partnerships are the standard maintenance required to keep Guard units in the field, the standard maintenance required by the partner units, which must be paid by the partner governments, and the "travel-related expenses" above and beyond them. The Guard units are maintained by "Army or Air Force Personal Accounts," including "pay and allowances." The travel-related expenses are paid from separate funds, the Operations and Maintenance (O&M) accounts, of which there are many, such as the following:

- National Guard Bureau’s International Affairs Division funds.
- Combatant Commander’s Initiative Fund (CCIF), established under 10 U.S. Code 166a. Accessed only by the CJCS or someone designated by him, the fund is used for payments on request to a "commander of a combatant command" for a number of specified activities, such as joint exercises.
- The Wales Initiative Fund (WIF) is a yearly amount voted by Congress to be used in support of NATO's Partnership for Peace (PfP) Program.
- Combating Terrorism Fellowship Program (CFTP)
- Cooperative Threat Reduction Program (CTR)
- Asia-Pacific Regional Initiative Fund (APRI)
- Latin American Cooperation (LATAM COOP)
- Overseas Humanitarian, Disaster, and Civic Assistance (OHDCA)
- Minuteman Fellowship (MMF; no longer in existence)
- Building Partner Capacity (BPC)
- Overseas Humanitarian Assistance (OHA)

== The program in action ==
=== Deployment through geographic commands ===
All SPP activities are coordinated through the geographic Combatant Commanders, the U.S. Ambassadors' country teams, the partner State, and other agencies as appropriate, to ensure that National Guard support is tailored to meet both U.S. and country objectives. Specifically, all activities must support the Theater Campaign Plan (TCP) as well as individual U.S. Ambassador mission plans in the countries where they operate. The unique civil-military nature of the National Guard allows active participation in a wide range of security cooperation activities, such as:

- emergency management and disaster response
- border and port security
- leadership and NCO development
- medical capacities
- economic security
- natural resource protection
- peacekeeping operations
- counter trafficking
- counter proliferation
- counter terrorism

=== Current partnerships ===
The State Partnership Program consists of 88 partnerships (1 March 2023) with 100 sovereign countries across all six combatant commands. The discrepancy between 88 and 100 is due to there being one partnership with the Regional Security System (RSS), a prior security organization of 7 island nations in the Eastern Caribbean. All other cases follow the rule, one nation, one partnership. In some cases more than one Guard unit is partnered with a nation. The following is a list of partnerships, with the year they were formed.

==== USAFRICOM ====
USAFRICOM currently maintains 18 SPP relationships:

- 2003, Morocco / Utah
- 2003, South Africa / New York
- 2004, Ghana / North Dakota
- 2004, Tunisia / Wyoming
- 2006, Nigeria / California
- 2008, Botswana / North Carolina
- 2008, Senegal / Vermont
- 2009, Liberia / Michigan
- 2014, Benin / North Dakota
- 2014, Togo / North Dakota
- 2015, Djibouti / Kentucky
- 2015, Kenya / Massachusetts
- 2017, Niger / Indiana
- 2018, Burkina Faso / District of Columbia
- 2019, Rwanda / Nebraska
- 2022, Cabo Verde / New Hampshire
- 2024, Zambia / North Carolina
- 2024, Malawi / North Carolina

==== USCENTCOM ====
USCENTCOM currently maintains 9 SPP relationships:

- 1993, Kazakhstan / Arizona
- 1996, Kyrgyz Republic / Montana
- 2003, Tajikistan / Virginia
- 2004, Jordan / Colorado
- 2012, Uzbekistan / Mississippi
- 2018, Qatar / West Virginia
- 2020, Egypt / Texas
- 2021, Turkmenistan / Montana
- 2022, Oman / Arizona

==== USEUCOM ====
USEUCOM currently maintains 25 SPP relationships:

- 1993, Bulgaria / Tennessee
- 1993, Czech Republic / Nebraska, Texas
- 1993, Estonia / Maryland
- 1993, Hungary / Ohio
- 1993, Latvia / Michigan
- 1993, Lithuania / Pennsylvania
- 1993, North Macedonia / Vermont
- 1993, Poland / Illinois
- 1993, Romania / Alabama
- 1993, Slovenia / Colorado
- 1993, Ukraine / California
- 1994, Georgia / Georgia
- 1994, Slovakia / Indiana
- 1996, Croatia / Minnesota
- 1996, Moldova / North Carolina
- 2001, Albania / New Jersey
- 2002, Azerbaijan / Oklahoma
- 2003, Armenia / Kansas
- 2003, Bosnia and Herzegovina / Maryland
- 2005, Serbia / Ohio
- 2006, Montenegro / Maine
- 2011, Kosovo / Iowa
- 2021, Austria / Vermont
- 2022, Cyprus / New Jersey
- 2023, Norway / Minnesota
- 2024 Sweden / New York

==== USINDOPACOM ====
USINDOPACOM currently maintains 13 SPP relationships:

- 2000, Philippines / Guam, Hawaii
- 2002, Thailand / Washington
- 2003, Mongolia / Alaska
- 2006, Indonesia / Hawaii
- 2008, Bangladesh / Oregon
- 2009, Cambodia / Idaho
- 2012, Vietnam / Oregon
- 2014; 2018, Tonga & Fiji & Samoa / Nevada
- 2017, Malaysia / Washington
- 2020, Papua New Guinea / Wisconsin
- 2020; 2021, Sri Lanka & Maldives / Montana

==== USNORTHCOM ====
USNORTHCOM currently maintains one SPP relationship:

- 2005, Bahamas / Rhode Island

==== USSOUTHCOM ====
USSOUTHCOM currently maintains 24 SPP relationships:

- 1996, Belize / Louisiana
- 1996, Ecuador / Kentucky
- 1996, Panama / Missouri
- 1996, Peru / West Virginia
- 1998, Honduras / Puerto Rico
- 1998, Venezuela / Florida
- 1999, Bolivia / Mississippi
- 1999, Jamaica / District of Columbia
- 2000, El Salvador / New Hampshire
- 2000, Uruguay / Connecticut
- 2001, Paraguay / Massachusetts
- 2002, Guatemala / Arkansas
- 2003, Dominican Republic / Puerto Rico
- 2003, Guyana / Florida
- 2003, Nicaragua / Wisconsin
- 2004, Trinidad-Tobago / Delaware
- 2006, Costa Rica / New Mexico
- 2006, RSS / Florida, Virgin Islands
- 2006, Suriname / South Dakota
- 2008, Chile / Texas
- 2011, Haiti / Louisiana
- 2012, Colombia / South Carolina
- 2016, Argentina / Georgia
- 2018, Brazil / New York

=== Gallery ===
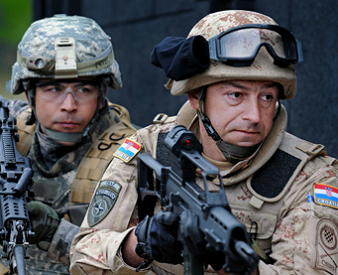
Croatian and Minnesota Soldiers prepare to clear a room together at the JMRC

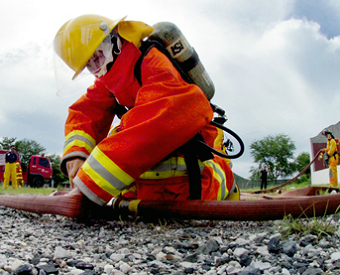
A Thai firefighter trains with the Washington National Guard

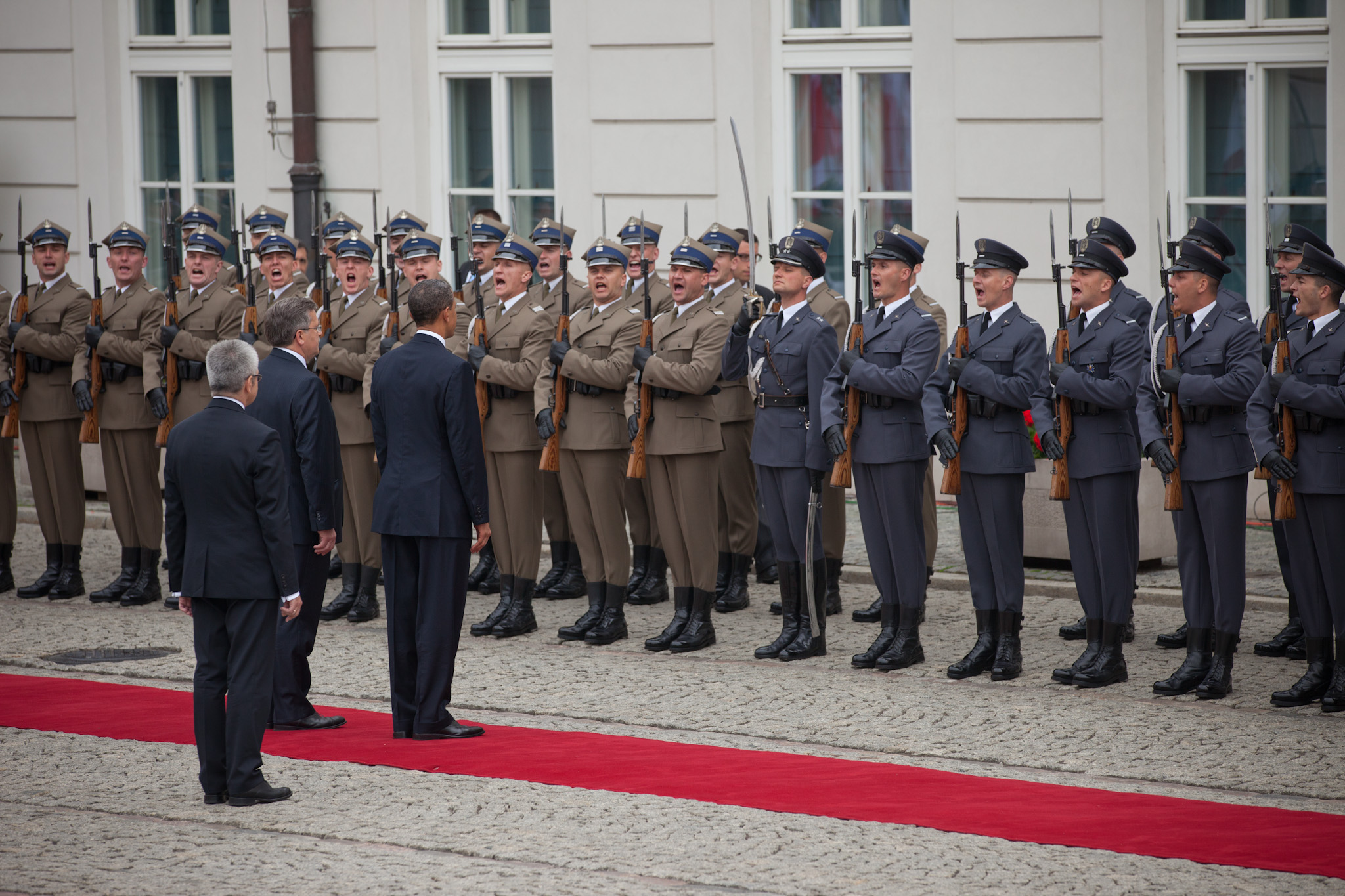
President Barack Obama reviews Polish soldiers alongside soldiers from Illinois

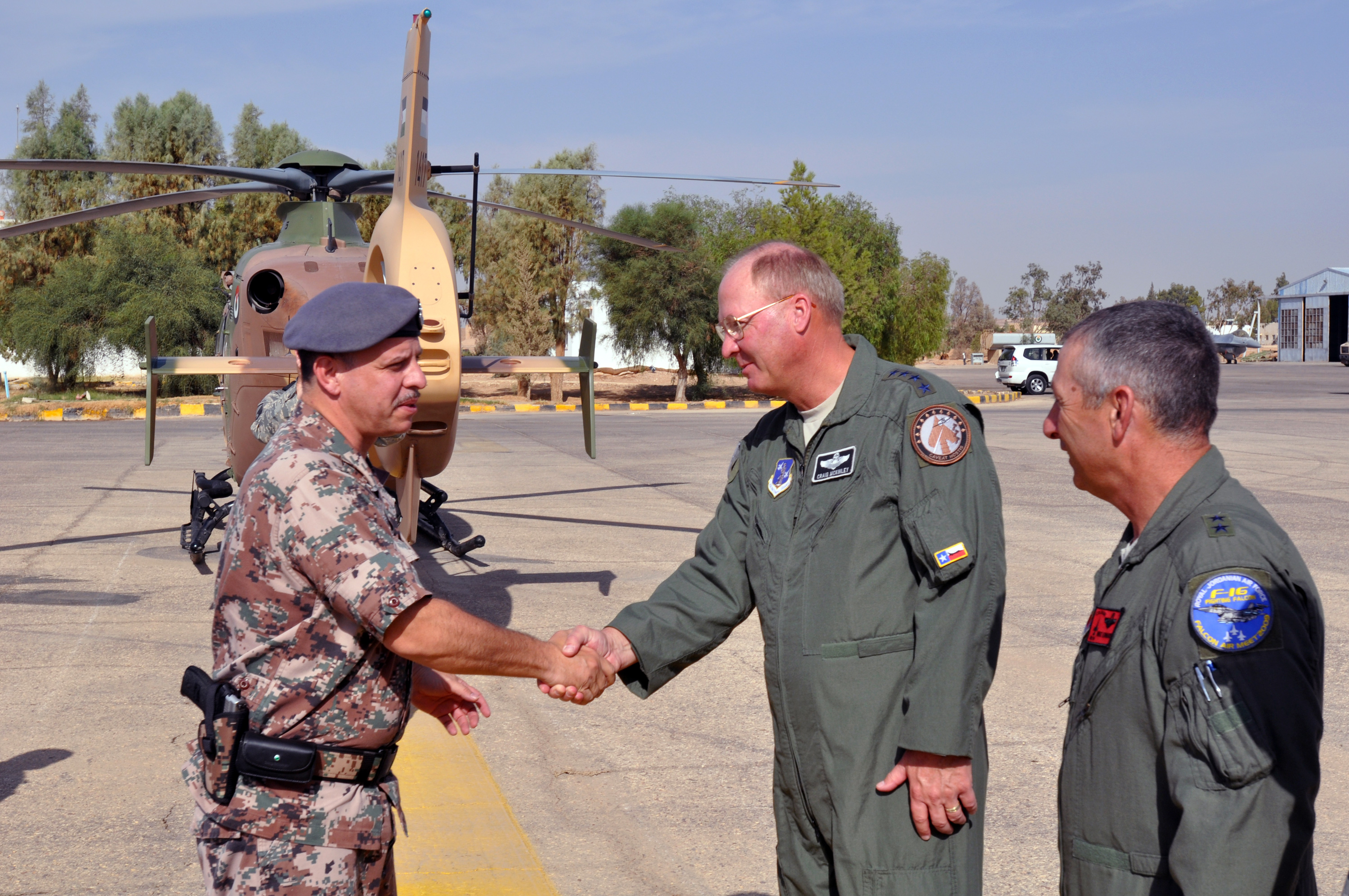
Jordan's Prince Feisal Ibn Al-Hussein greets Gen. Craig McKinley and CO-TAG in Jordan

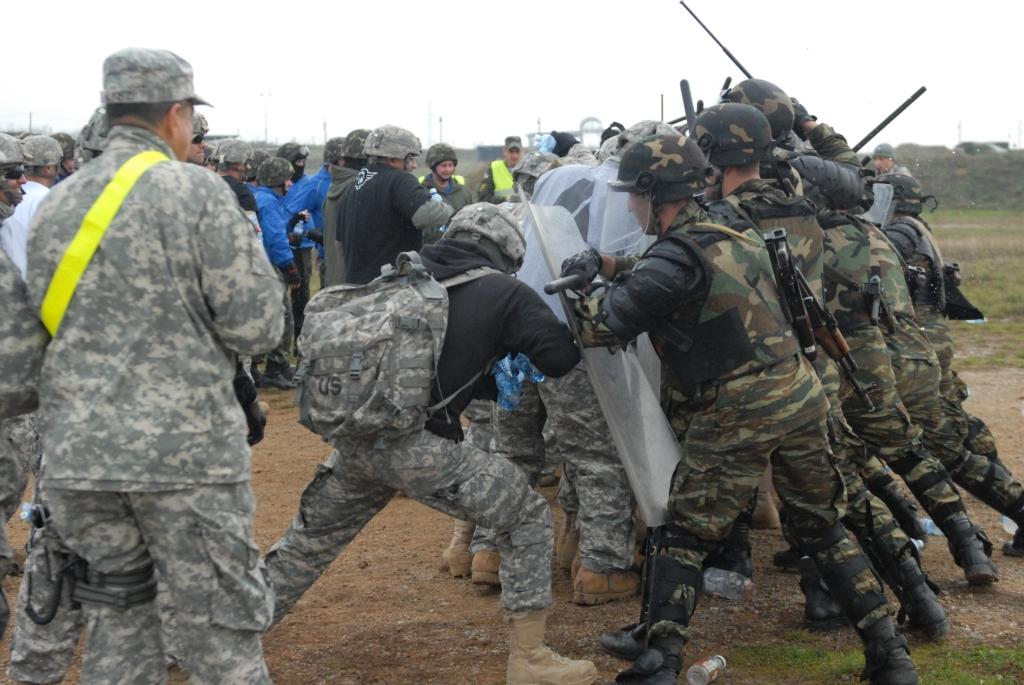
Soldiers from Kansas and Armenia practice a riot control exercise

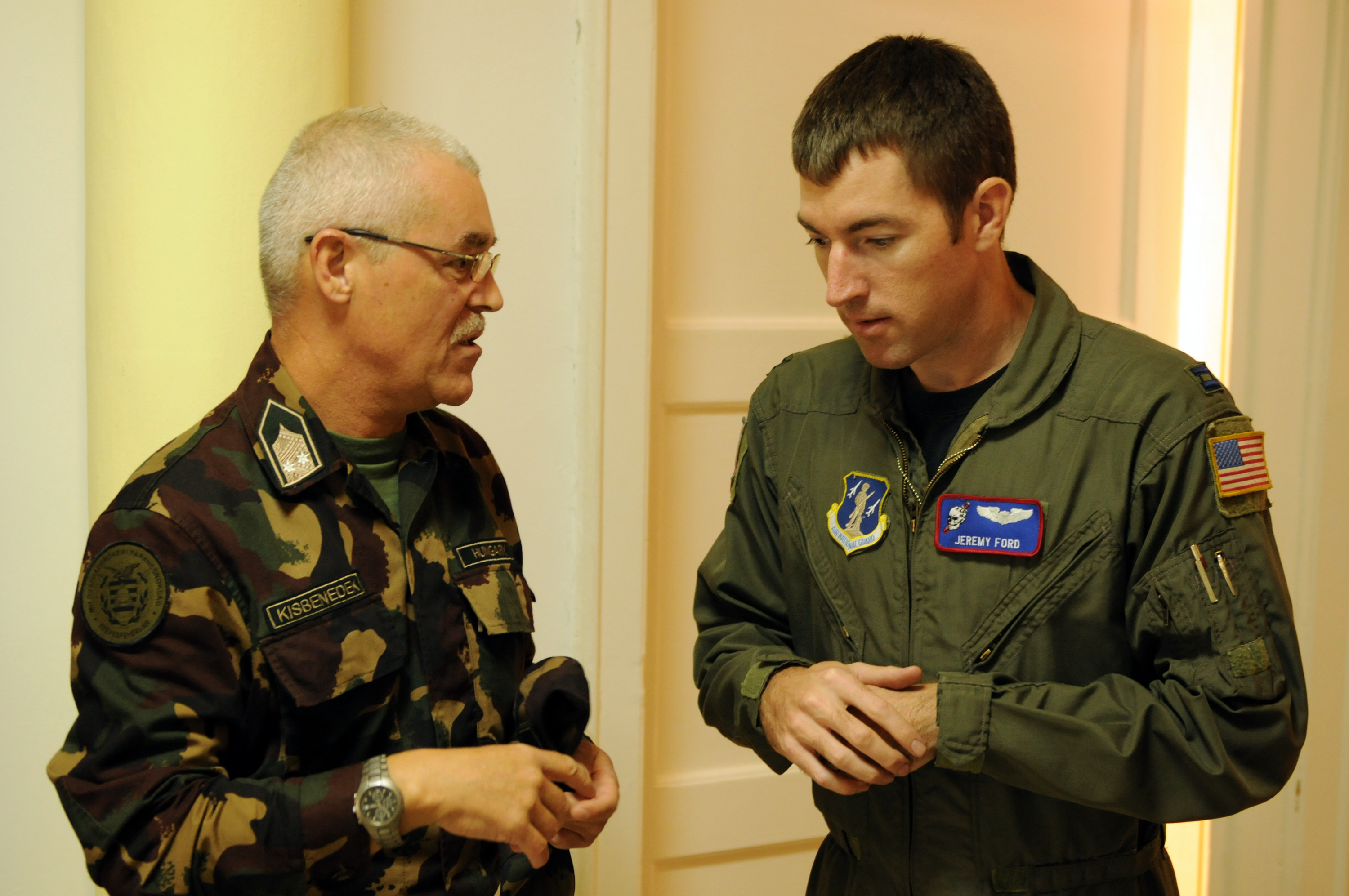
Ohio National Guard's Bilateral Affairs Officer (BAO) in Hungary, talks with a Hungarian counterpart

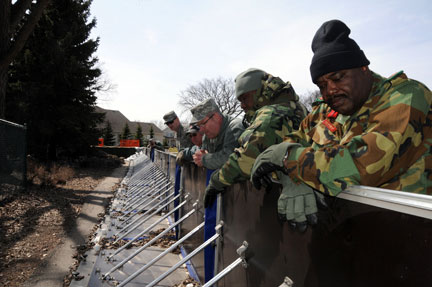
North Dakota Guardsmen train with soldiers from Ghana on flood protection

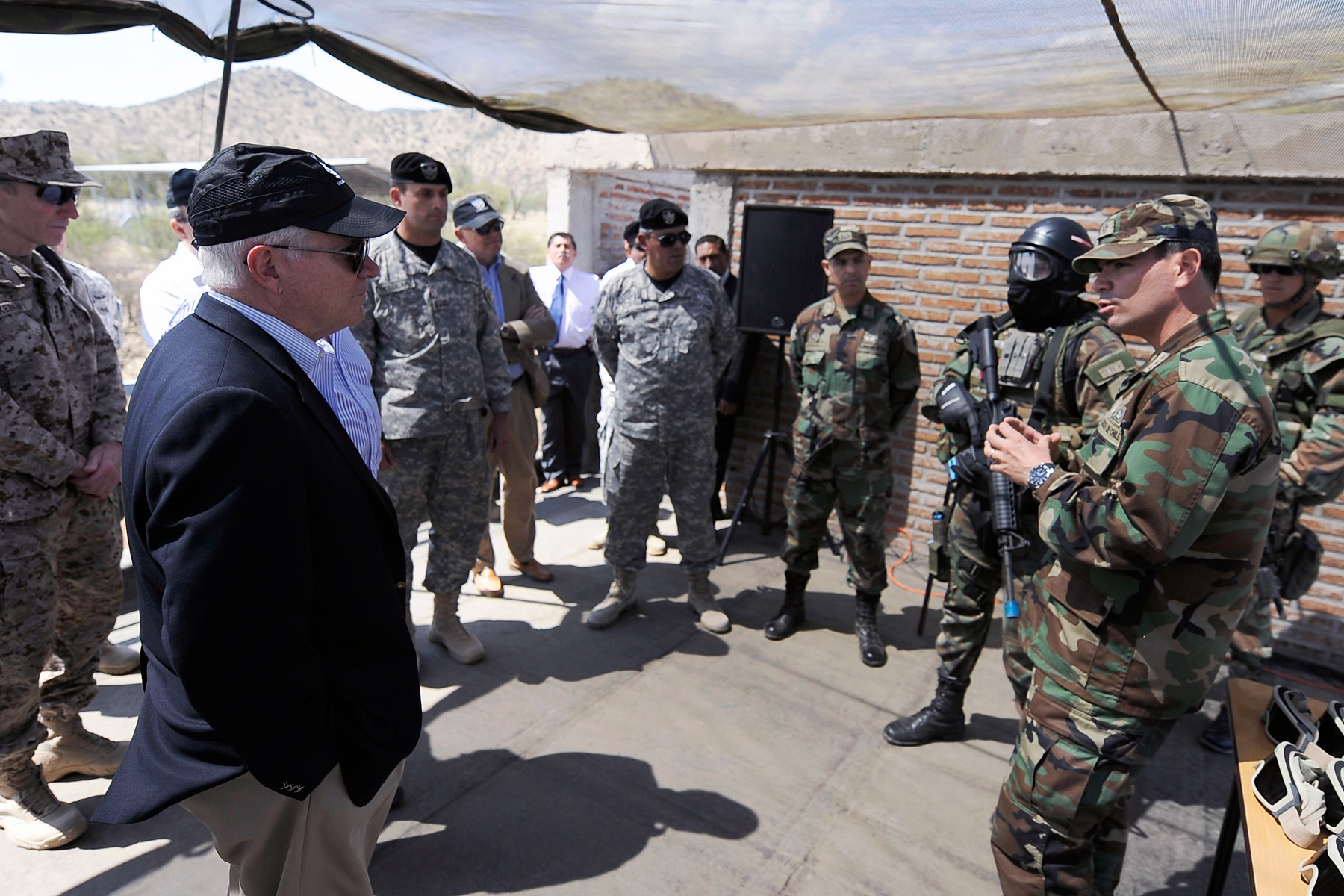
Secretary Gates talks with Chilean Special Forces alongside Texas Guardsmen

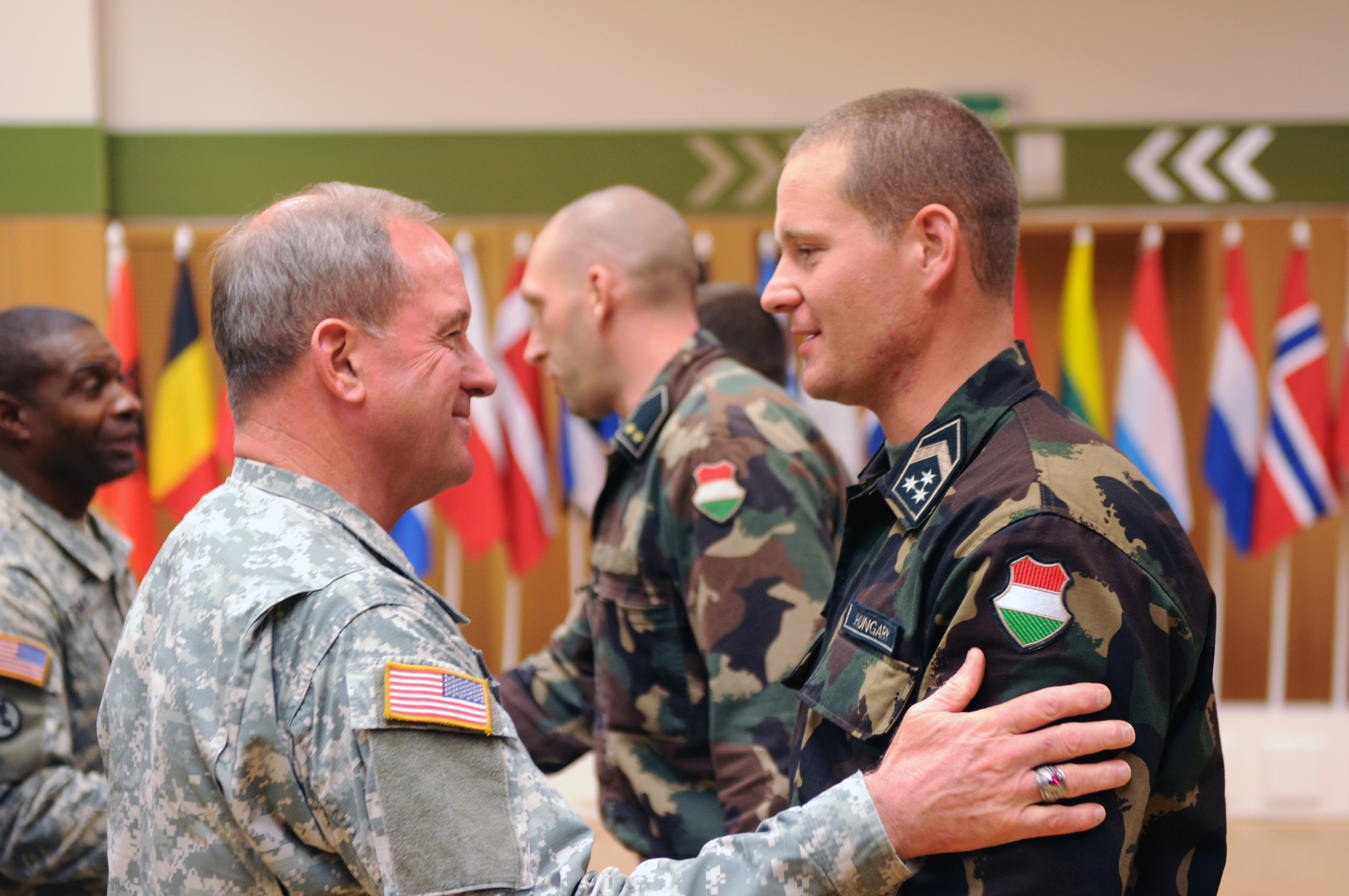
The Ohio Adjutant General awards the Ohio Commendation Medal to Hungarian soldiers

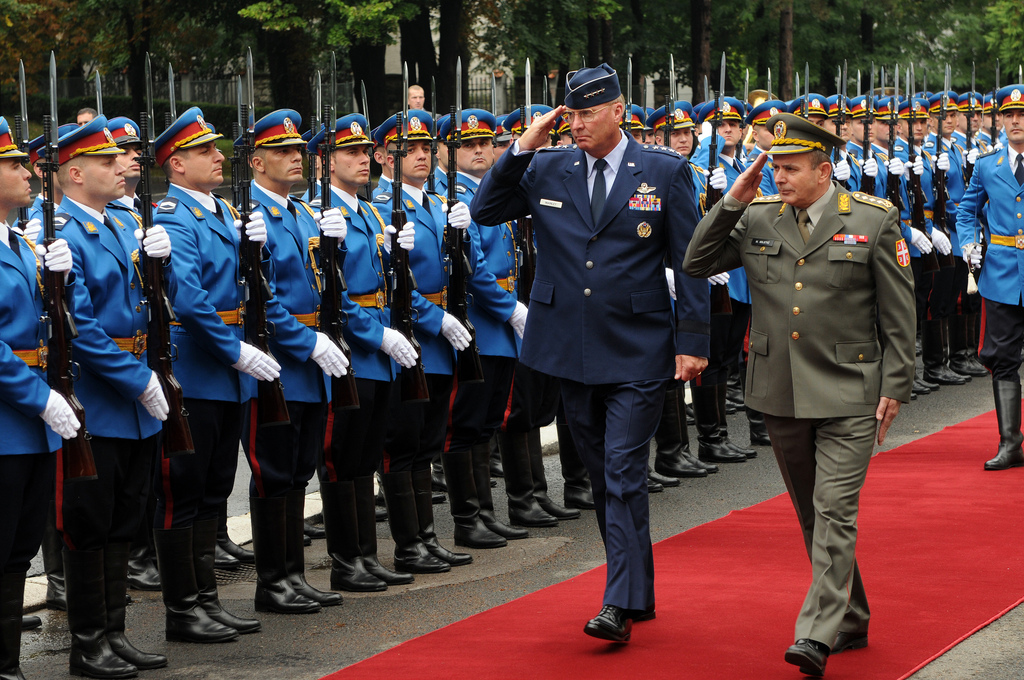
The NGB Chief reviews Serbian Soldiers during an exercise between Ohio and Serbia

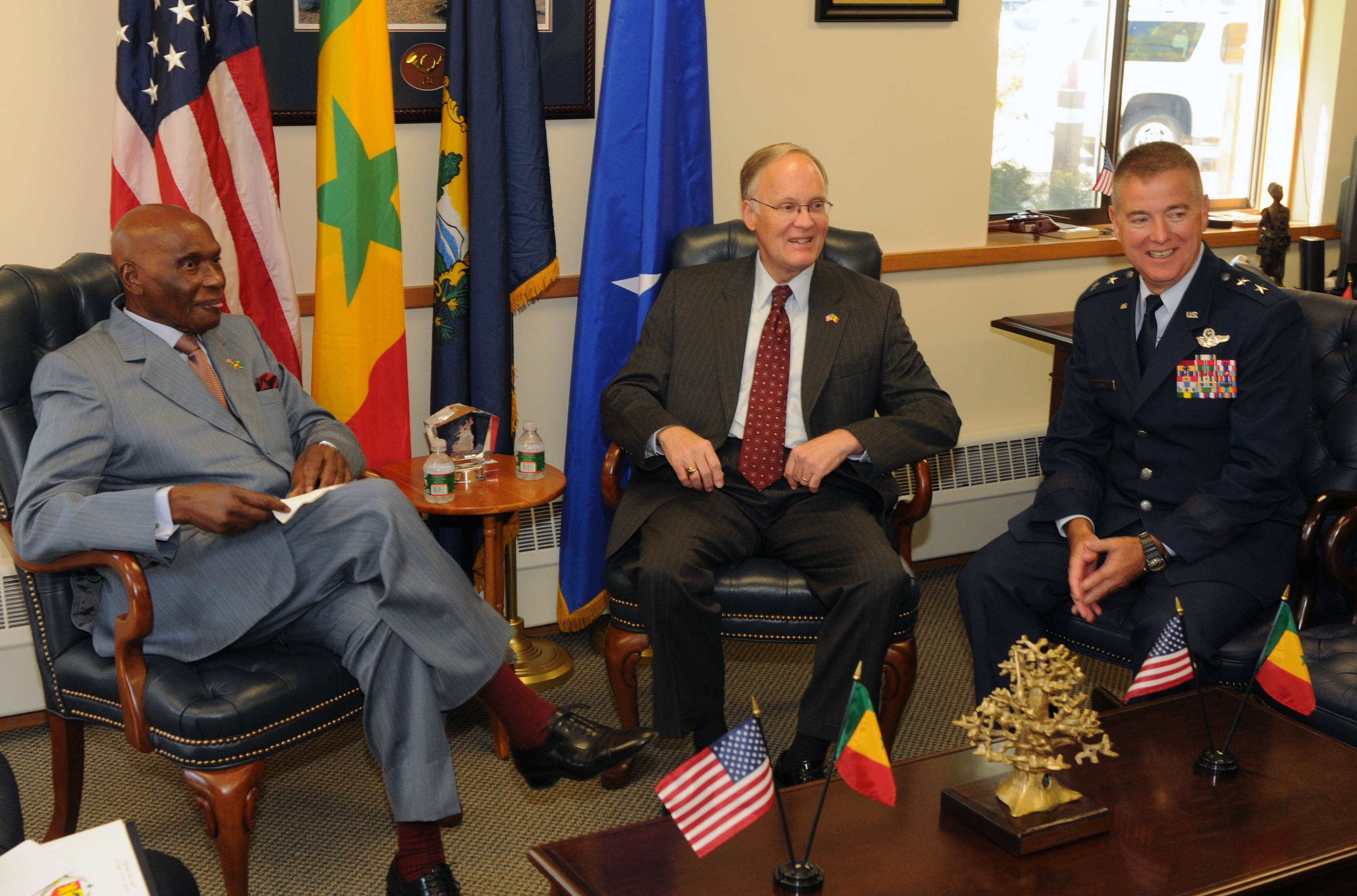
President Wade of Senegal meets with the Vermont Governor and TAG

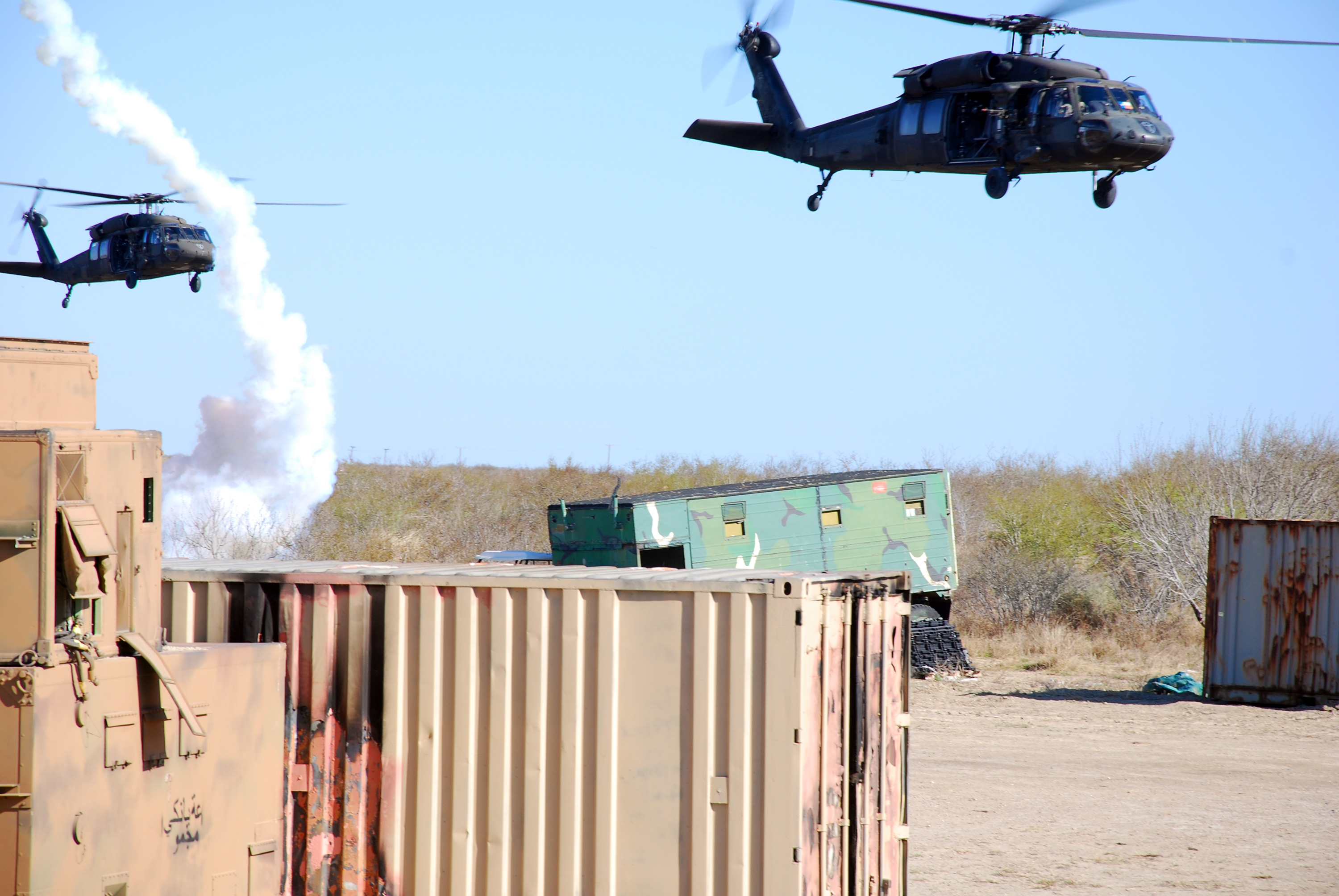
Soldiers from Texas and Czech Republic conduct Blackhawk training exercises

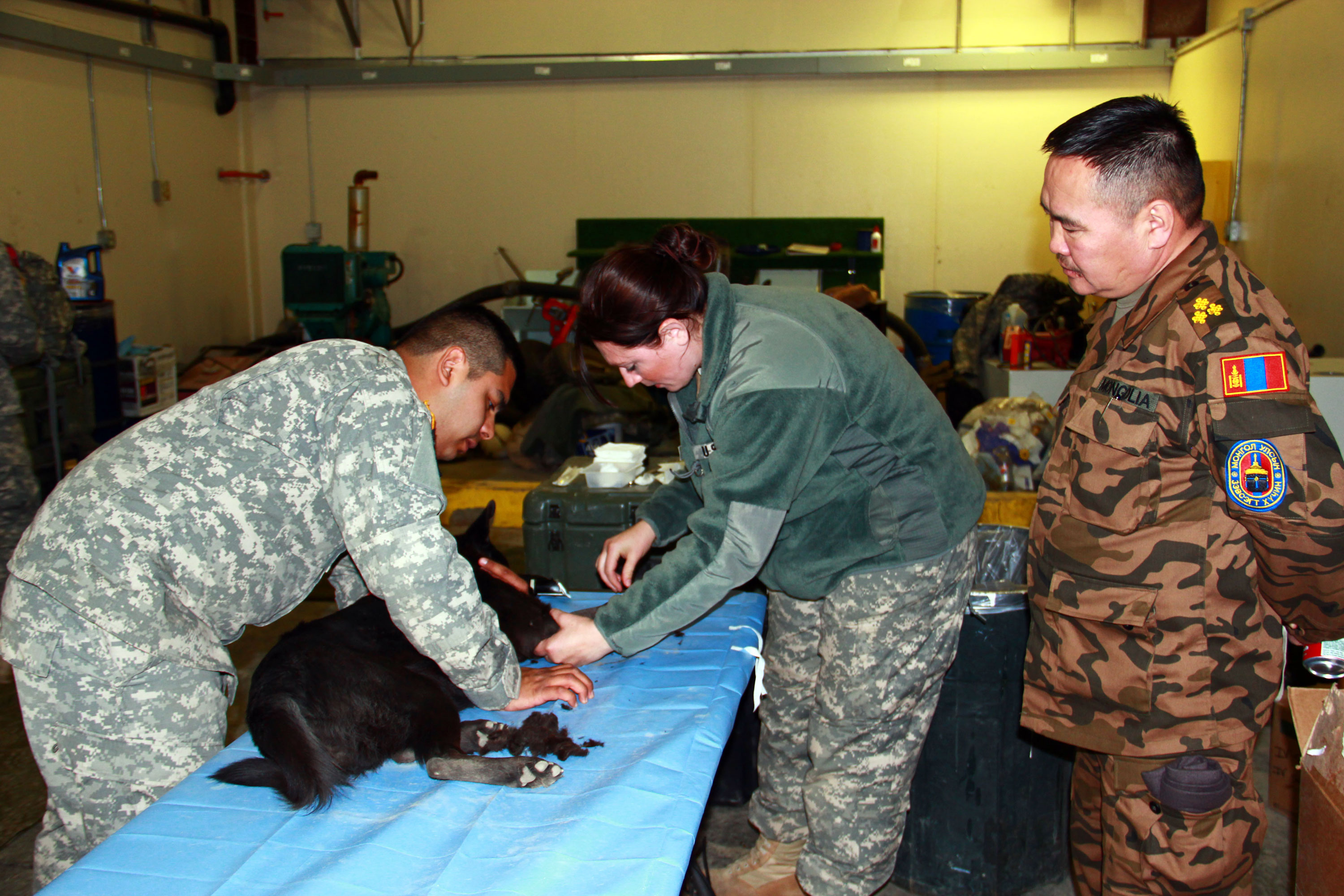
Mongolian General observes Guardsmen perform veterinary services in Alaska

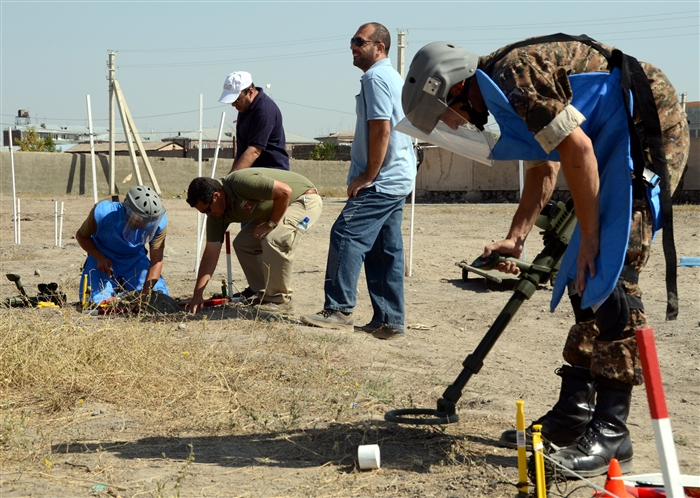
Soldiers from Kansas and Armenia train together on demining operations

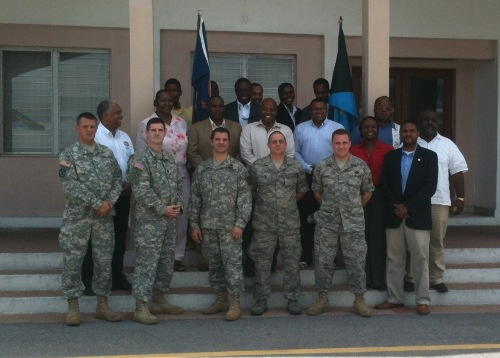
Bahamian Police participate in Forensics Workshop with Rhode Island Guardsmen

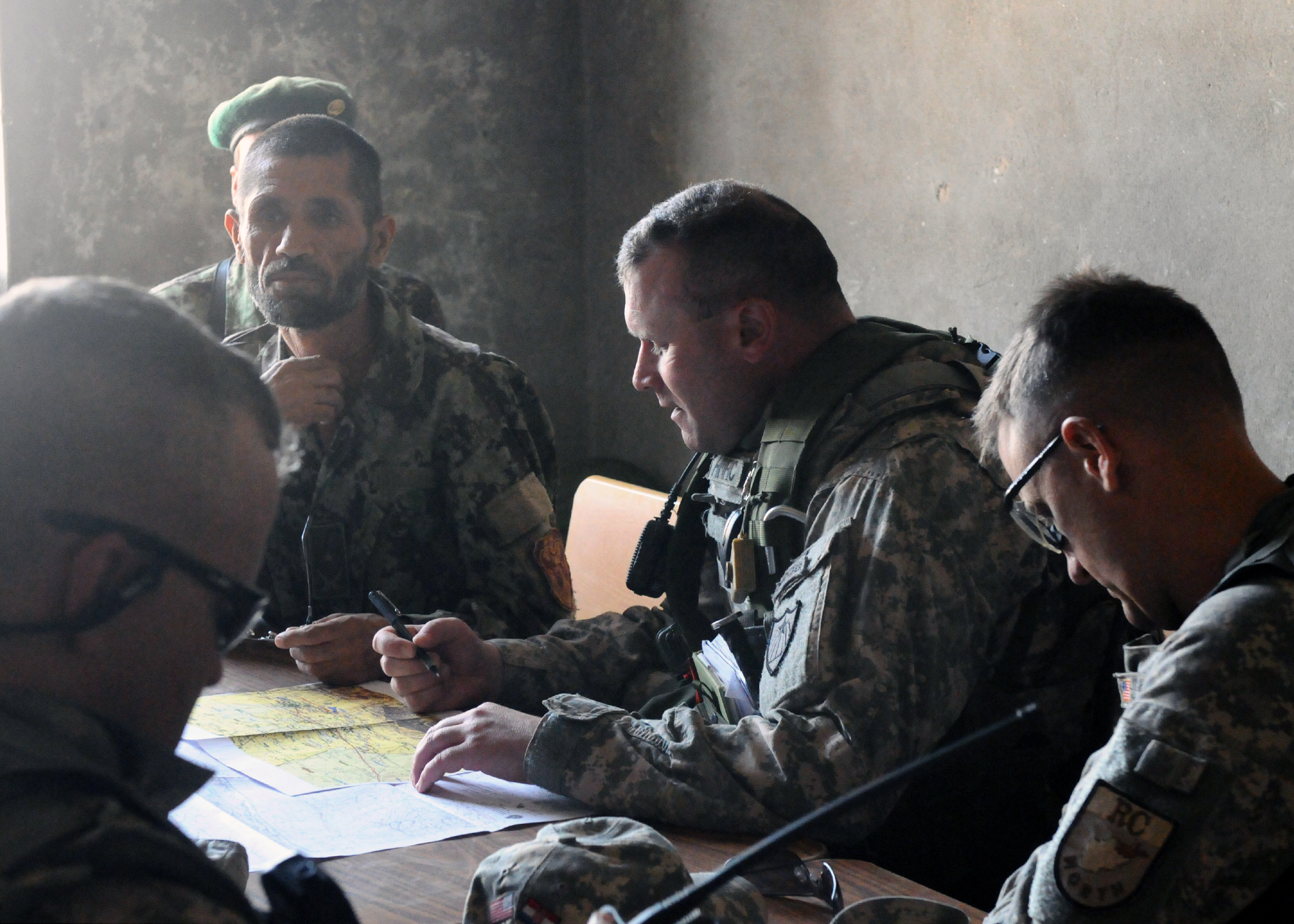
Minnesotan and Croatian troops assist in Afghan election

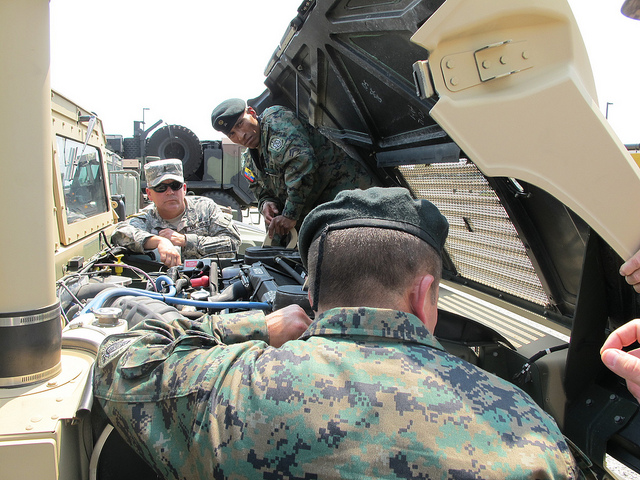
Ecuadorian soldiers perform HMMWV maintenance with Kentucky Guardsmen

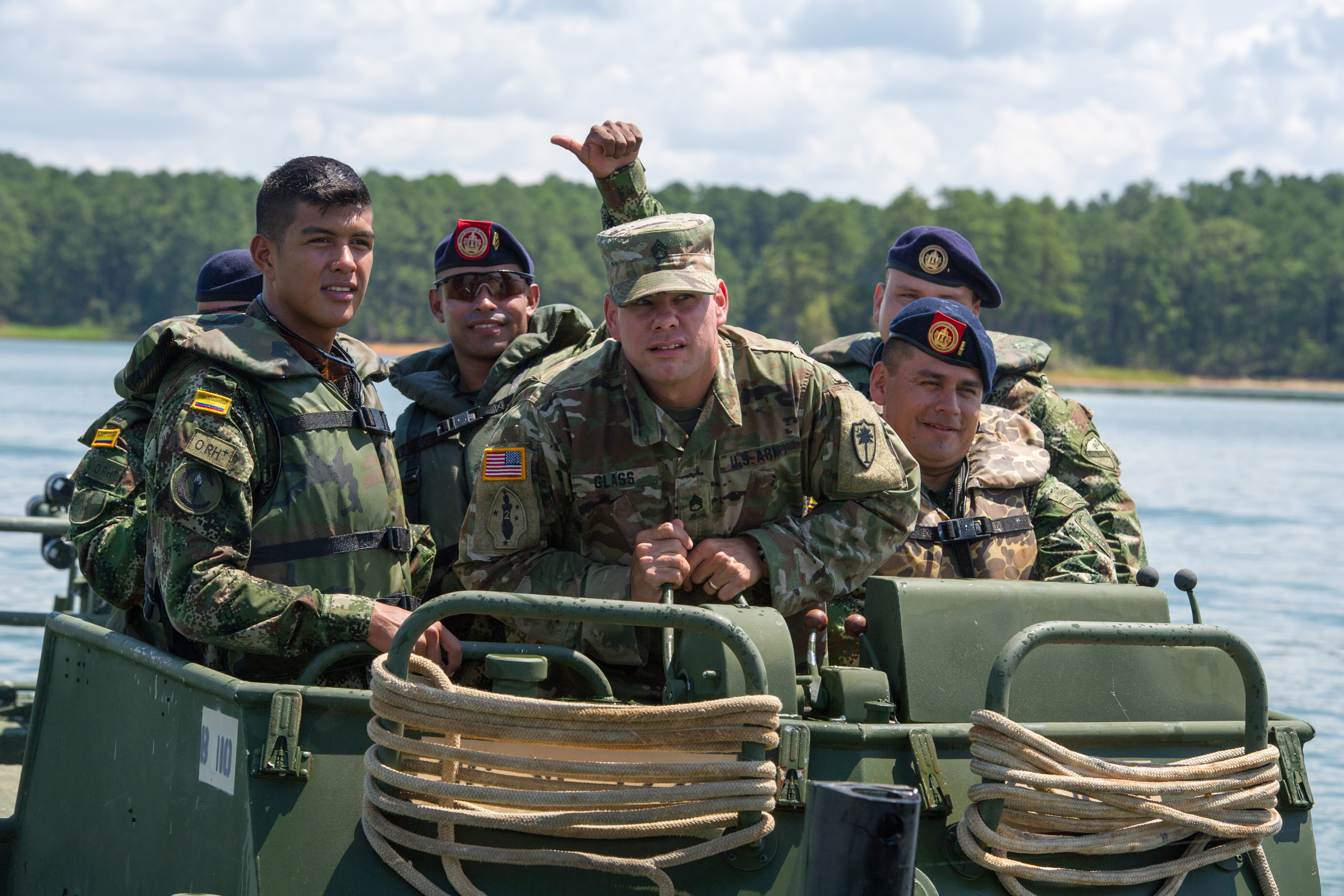
Colombian Army Engineers alongside 125th Multi Role Bridge Company soldiers from the South Carolina Army National Guard

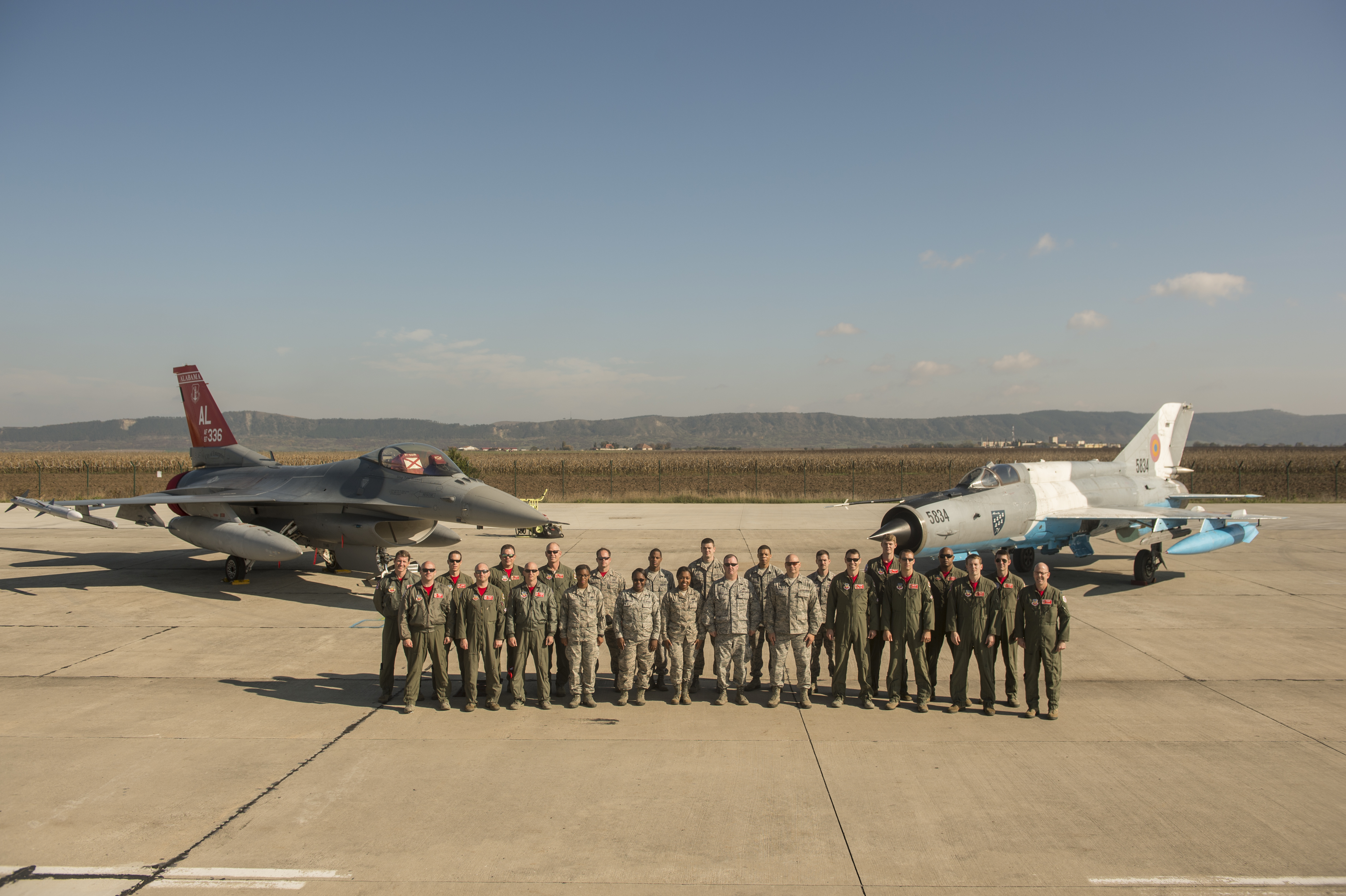
Members of the Alabama Air National Guard in Romania during exercise Dacian Viper 2015

== Benefits of the SPP ==
A report to the Committees on Armed Services of the Senate and House of Representatives published in May 2012 enumerates benefits of the State Partnership Program as reported by the State Partnership Program Coordinators, the Bilateral Affairs Officers, and Combatant Command officials:

State Partnership Program Coordinators
Bilateral Affairs Officers (BAO)
Officials from combatant commands

- Provides experience and training for Guardsmen
- Develops relationship with partner country
- Encourages partners to co-deploy to Iraq or Afghanistan
- Improves retention or provides other incentives for Guardsmen
- Guardsmen benefit from partner country’s experiences
- Events are tied to Combatant Command (CCMD) or country team mission
- Good communication and coordination between stakeholders
- Provides information sharing and support to partner country
- Builds relationship with partner country
- Encourages partners to co-deploy to Iraq or Afghanistan
- Events support combatant command mission and objectives
- NG units possess unique skills in support of CCMD objectives
- Encourages partner nation deployment to Iraq or Afghanistan

== Steps to new partnerships ==
1. Nation requests participation through U.S. Ambassador
2. U.S. Ambassador endorses request to the geographic combatant commander
3. Geographic combatant commander submits nomination through the Joint Staff to the Office of the Secretary of Defense (OSD)
4. OSD prioritizes annual nominations according to global strategic priority
5. OSD requests partner State recommendation for selected new partnerships from the Chief, National Guard Bureau (CNGB)
6. CNGB submits recommendation for partner State to OSD
7. OSD approves partnership after receiving concurrence from the Department of State
8. Signing ceremony occurs in new partner nation
9. Partnership interaction begins

== Development of the State Partnership Program ==
The SPP began and developed as a streamlined program to assist the former satellite republics of the Soviet Union to find stability and acceptance by NATO after the demise of the Warsaw Pact on July 1, 1991, and the dissolution of the Soviet Union on December 26 of that year. Its scope was originally limited to that theater under the jurisdiction of EUCOM.

=== Reagan's change of policy ===
The first move in the direction of the Partnership Program was a change in U.S. policy toward Eastern-bloc countries under President Ronald Reagan. The previous policy had been a consequence of the Hungarian Revolution of 1956, a bloody suppression of a native Hungarian uprising by forces of the Soviet Union. Soviet tanks in the streets of Budapest were a scene depicted by the media of the times. The Soviets under Nikita Khrushchev seemed implacable in their resolution to pursue and eliminate all the revolutionaries they could find. Former co-nationals of Austria in the Austro-Hungarian Empire, Hungary had been an ally of the Third Reich, contributing some ten divisions to the invasion of Russia. They recanted in 1944, following the model of Italy's recantation, but it was too late. Overrun by Soviet forces on the way to Berlin, they became a satellite of the Soviet Union and member of the Warsaw Pact. They were behind the Iron Curtain.

The revolutionaries called upon the United States for support. It offered them assurances of backing in the event of victory; however, no actual combat support was forthcoming. The CIA appeared to have lost all its arms caches. Khrushchev at last quipped that American support might be compared to the support of a rope suspending a hanged man; i.e., the Americans would encourage the Hungarians to hang themselves by revolting but would make no move to assist them. As a result of this American fiasco the government adopted a policy of never communicating with countries behind the Iron Curtain but always approaching the Soviet Union first. The gates between east and west were resolutely shut. The Cold War was on.

Over three decades later, President Reagan, standing near the Berlin Wall, delivered what has been called his Berlin Wall speech addressing Mikhail Gorbachev (not there in person), then General Secretary of the Communist Party of the Soviet Union: "... If you seek prosperity for the Soviet Union ... if you seek liberalization ... tear down this wall!" He had no idea how close it was to being torn down, and with it the Iron Curtain and the Cold War. The cost of maintaining the Soviet Union and its satellites against widespread dissent was too great. The economy was beyond control. Communist Party membership was falling off. As the region was falling into poverty and cynicism, Gorbachev had proposed to the 27th Congress of the Communist Party of the Soviet Union on March 6, 1986, policies of glasnost, or candidness of governmental process, and peristroika, reorganization.

The sibling policies amounted to a license to self-determine. In May, 1989, Hungary, acting on its own, opened the border between itself and Austria, negating the Berlin wall, as Germans could travel between the two Germanies via Hungary and Austria. Its demolition began on November 9. German reunification was declared complete (and is celebrated as such) on October 3, 1990, considered the final settlement of World War II after 45 years of occupation. Russian troops everywhere were going home. Without fear of military intervention, the republics of the Soviet Union were negotiating their release and declaring independence. The dissolution of the Soviet Union was declared by itself on December 26, 1991. Gorbachev had been its last President. He was to recede gradually into obscurity. The President of Russia, Boris Yeltsin, came to the fore. The Russian flag flew that evening at the Kremlin. The nations of the Warsaw Pact were no less eager to escape from it. The Pact declared itself dissolved on July 1, 1991, from lack of members.

In 1990, with the collapse of the Warsaw Pact impending, the United States reversed its "hands-off" policy and began to seek military-to-military contacts with individual nations of the Eastern Bloc through EUCOM, the Unified Combatant Command that would logically have jurisdiction over such contacts. The DoD was encouraged to do so by Mark Palmer, ambassador to Hungary, supported by Caspar Weinberger. Palmer's new views were based on his observation of the "regime change" associated with the end of communism in Hungary (1989). Despite the fiasco of 1956, the Hungarians were still interested in the support of the United States. They had nothing to fear from Soviet tanks now.

A former member of the Civil Rights Movement and the Student Nonviolent Coordinating Committee, as well as being co-founder of the National Endowment for Democracy, Palmer was idealistically motivated to help bring about democracy in the Eastern Bloc nations. In 1988 and 1989 he had already initiated friendly visits between five NATO nations and five Warsaw Pact nations, which impressed both sides with their spirit of conviviality. These experiences were building confidence in amicable partnership. Both sides were learning that they did not need to be enemies.

=== Pre-partnership programs and problems ===
As the Soviet Union disintegrated between 1989 and 1991, U.S. government officials explored options to minimize instability and encourage democratic governments in the former Soviet bloc nations. One effort to address these policy goals was to expand military-to-military contacts with the newly independent states of Central and Eastern Europe. At the time the United States cautiously put the new policy before the Soviet Union. There would be in fact a failed attempt at a military coup in favor of restoring the old Soviet Union. The Americans not only found ready assent from the new Soviet Union, but that Union itself was asking for the assistance Reagan had promised if democratic and humanitarian measures were taken, such as tearing down the wall.

In 1989 the DOD sponsored the Interagency Working Groups (IWG's) for the purpose of developing mil-to-mil contacts, one with the Soviet Union and one with Eastern and Central Europe. They were to be the oversight, or steering groups. The US-Soviet Union IWG did not outlast the break-up of the Soviet Union. The East Europe IWG met on August 15, 1990, to formulate objectives, of which the first was "Promoting development of non-political militaries accountable to democratically elected civilian leadership." In November, 1990, the East Europe IWG initiated a two-year program of "confidence-building visits" by staff members of EUCOM: the legal advisor, the chaplain, the surgeon, etc., with reciprocal visits to EUCOM headquarters. The purpose of the visits was to open and maintain dialogues on various special topics. In November, 1991, the IWG delegated the authority to initiate such contacts in Europe to EUCOM.

As the Soviet Union defeated an attempted military coup in August, 1991, which was attempting a restoration, and began to lose its Republics at an accelerated pace, the DoD became embued with a sense of urgency that outran the two-year program. Dick Cheney, United States Secretary of Defense, created independently a program of Bilateral Working Groups (BWG's), one per nation. A BWG would consist of senior officers in EUCOM and others from the host nation. They would agree to discuss "defense restructuring and reorganization." The BWG's began in September, 1992. In November, Cheney turned the program over to the remaining IWG.

Meanwhile, elated by its success, EUCOM went what turned out to be a bridge too far in proposing the EUCOM Coordination and Assistance Program (EUCAP), which would take the contact initiative away from the Eastern Bloc countries. The Americans themselves would identify and approach candidates instead of waiting for their applications. The Americans would on their own approach the country to discuss its "interests and capabilities," offering a total package of military reconstruction.

After consultation with the United States Department of State, EUCOM forwarded its ambitious proposal to Colin Powell, CJCS, on February 27, 1992. On December 16, 1991, Powell had already presented to his staff his idea of "contact teams." One team of about 50 specialists would spend 6–12 months helping a host country reorganize its military. The program's written goals aimed at every conceivable ideal from respect for human rights, the rule of law, political democracy, and a market economy, to a complete understanding of and sensitivity to American culture; in short, total Americanization. They would in fact be trying to redefine the national culture.

In the Spring of 1992, all the proposals arrived at the President's desk in Washington. The Presidential watch had changed. George H. W. Bush, Reagan's Vice President, was President since January, 1989. He was concerned about political stability and the disposition of the nuclear weapons in the possession of the former Soviet republics. Aiming at creating a stable policy for the region, he affirmed the IWG as the steering organization and turned over all the relevant programs to it.

During the previous year, meanwhile, Gorbachev, seeing the end coming, had been struggling to create some portable unity that would carry on after the fall of the Soviet Union. He proposed changing the government to a federation called the Union of Sovereign States, a less centralized government in which the Republics would have more independence. It failed to win the unanimous approval of the nine loyal Republics (out of 15, the other six abstaining from the vote). A second proposal for the Commonwealth of Independent States (CIS) was accepted and co-existed temporarily with the Soviet Union. It was an agreement to act together in matters of trade and security. Its core was the loyal nine, but the total membership would grow to 12.

The difference between the 12 and the 15 was the three Baltic States: Lithuania, Latvia, and Estonia. They had been part of the Russian Empire, which inherited them from the Polish–Lithuanian Commonwealth. The Russian Empire ended in 1917. The Baltics were ceded to Germany by the Treaty of Brest-Litovsk, March 3, 1918. When Germany conceded the loss of World War I, it attempted to retain the Baltics, who had been the left flank of the Eastern Front, through the use of Freikorps, supposedly non-national mercenary volunteers.

The Russian Revolution began shortly and was settled by the Russian Civil War, which lasted November, 1917, through October, 1922. Units from the Baltic states fought on both sides, red (Bolshevik) and white (Czarist). The predominant theme in the states themselves was independence. The western victors of WW I withheld any interference in the Russian Civil War, except for a disastrous attempted rescue of the Czar by British forces, which ended in the massacre of the Czar and all his family. At the end of the Civil War the Baltics were independent. The new Soviet Union was not strong enough to recapture them. On September 22, 1921, the League of Nations made a statement of its own by admitting the Baltic states.

The Baltics were recaptured by invasion after the Molotov–Ribbentrop Pact (popularly known as the Stalin–Hitler Pact) of August 23, 1939, in which Stalin and Hitler divided Poland into spheres of influence. Hitler's invasion of Poland was the immediate cause of WW II. The Baltics considered Stalin's invasion and therefore his acquisition of their countries illegal and invalid acts. On March 11, 1990, Lithuania redeclared independence, Latvia on August 21, 1991, and Estonia on August 20, 1991. Russian troops still occupied the countries. The Russians owned much of the industrial capacities. There was some Russian resistance to their departure, but Gorbachev was obliged to follow his policies. In 1991 the Russians abroad were left hanging without authorization, as their current country had not stationed them there. It was to be years before national partitions were complete, during which Russians and Americans coexisted in the same countries.

The United States, under some urgency to forestall any Eastern-bloc backsliding, accelerated its IWG Program. Combining EUCOM's EUCAP with his own Contact Teams concept, on April 22, 1992, Colin Powell presented the Charter of a new program, the Joint Contact Team Program (JCTP). Command was to be entrusted to USCINCEUR (U.S. Command-in-Chief Europe, then Army General John Shalikashvili), the head of EUCOM. Contact Teams were to be sent forthwith to Hungary, Poland, and Czechoslovakia. The JCTP was to feature a Headquarters Contact Team Program Office (CCTPO), as many Military Liaison Teams (MLT's) as there were host countries contacted, and the first contact personnel, the Traveling Contact Teams (TCT's).

Attempted implementation of the program revealed its weaknesses immediately. Planned in the halls of the Pentagon, it was somewhat too grandiose for the field. Initially not enough qualified persons bilingual in the desired languages could be found even to begin the program. The DoD advertised for bilingual volunteers, conducting telephone interviews with the few bilinguals they did have. Eventually a concentration was found in the 10th Special Forces Group, a unit that had been working with EUCOM in Europe. They were recruited, but with an unforeseen effect in public relations. They were not hired for their fighting skills, yet it appeared that the program was preparing for some sort of invasive effort, which served to delay their acceptance. A sufficient number of bilinguals was not recruited until late in 1993. Meanwhile, they had to begin with what they had.

By 1992, the MLT for the first country, Hungary, was only partly in place. Pushing on, the IWG was planning to send MLT's to Czechoslovakia and Poland, but the split of Czechoslovakia into the Czech Republic and Slovakia caused them to be deferred until 1993. Plans were made to extend invitations to all the Central and Eastern European countries, but the State Department reneged temporarily. The ambassadors believed it was too precipitous. Unrest in Romania and potential unrest in Albania caused their deferment. Despite the delays the IWG gradually began to approve countries for MLT's.

With the expansion, a second difficulty began to appear, this time within the DoD. The Joint Staff was having a problem finding funds for the large budget submitted by EUCOM for only three host countries. It was at this time that CJCS initiated a search for special funds to enhance the regular budgets of the agencies involved. By 1994 the cost had run so high, 13 million as opposed to 1993's 6 million, that obtaining any money from Washington was an uncertain and tedious process, not one which would secure reliable funds. To fund all the liaisons planned for the JCTP was unthinkable.

The final nail in the coffin of the program as it was then might be termed psycho-political. It was based on fear and mistrust of the United States. EUCOM attempting to extend the JCTP to the CIS, the nine plus Republics loyal to Russia, was being stone-walled. An interest was overtly expressed, but no approvals seemed to be able to be secured, which could only be the result of clandestine rejection by Russia. The JCTP was giving the wrong impression. The CIS did not want Americanization, and certainly did not want a longer-term American presence. It appeared as though the Americans wished to take the place of the Soviet Union. Russia was having second thoughts. The JCTP was at an impasse.

=== Partnership Program solution ===
The solution to the impasse, as far as it could be solved, was already within the JCTP. Success was a matter of its being recognized by the senior officers. It had begun as an attempt to add the Baltic states to the list of prospective hosts. An MLT was already partly established in Hungary, the first host country. The Czech Republic, Slovakia, and Poland were deferred pending their achievement of stability. Romania, Bulgaria, and Albania were next, to be followed by the Baltic states.

Meanwhile, NATO was not waiting for the United States to solve its impasses. At its July, 1990, Summit Meeting, it had determined to extend "the hand of friendship" to the Eastern Bloc. Over the course of the next year, a new organization was proposed, the North Atlantic Cooperation Council (NACC) to include Warsaw Pact and CIS nations. Its Charter was presented at the 1991 Rome summit in November. By providing mutual consultation services it would smooth over and help to stabilize the end of the Soviet Union. Its first meeting, on December 20, 1991, was interrupted by a message informing the Soviet ambassador his country did not exist any longer.

Latvia had belonged to the NACC from its very beginning. As the reputation of the JCTP began to spread, Latvia made an unusual request in July, 1992, to the NACC, with which it was familiar, rather than to the JCTP itself. It wanted to join, but it did not want the coaching of an active United States Army unit. Instead it passed the word to the NACC that it would prefer a National Guard unit. This was a surprise because in the past Latvia had recruited some of Europe's best elite professional troops, such as the Latvian Rifles. There were but few in Latvia who remembered them. They fought for the Tsar, then for the Bolsheviks. Detained subsequently in Russia, most never got home again.

The military needs of all the Baltic states are far different now than they were in 1915. The states are too small to put up much of a defense as individual countries; moreover, the terrain is mainly indefensible. Any defense force could be easily outflanked by a larger army. It is true that the retreating army of the 3rd Reich for a time formed a redoubt on the Kurland Peninsula, but it had no hope of victory, and was forced to surrender. It is also true that the extensive forest of the Valdai Hills in adjoining Russia gave shelter to various successful partisan groups. Wars are not won by partisans alone. The Latvian Rifles only fought for Latvia as units in the Tsar's army. They were expected to hold their sector of the Eastern Front, but as the war retreated from there, so did they.

Baltic military experts, still expert, were perfectly familiar with these well-known circumstances. The Latvians did not therefore plan for more than a token professional army as a sort of inner guiding corps. With the defeat of the Russian coup in August, 1991, they knew that they would be allowed to rebuild a military. Their very first unit of August was the Latvian National Guard, a contingent of citizen-soldiers. They were not first of all outsiders. They would be defending the country in which they were born and raised, nor could any foreign power remove them from there for missions not their own. Second, they were needed to work with civilian authorities for solving domestic problems of security and order. The requirement did not fit the mold of mil-to-mil associations; therefore, they requested an American unit that could work with civilians.

The DoD response to a request from the new Latvian Republic through the JACC for assistance building a National Guard called Zemessargi, "Land National Guard," to distinguish it from the previous Aizsargi, "National Guard," which had served the German occupation army until its dissolution by the Soviets in 1945, developed from suggestion to real beginning between January and November, 1992. Learning by some means that the JCTP would need a Guard unit, John B. Conaway, Chief of the National Guard Bureau, wrote to Colin Powell offering the services of the United States National Guard. Having already taken the initiative to develop a Guard solution to the impasse, he had been waiting for some such opportunity as this.

He, Vance Renfroe (a senior officer in the ANG), Wayne Gosnell (a senior officer in the ARNG), Max Alston (Army Reserve, retired), and staff, had been planning a new form of assistance, later to be called the SPP. For now, it was simply "the Baltic initiative." In retropect, Air Force Col. Joey Booher, Chief of International Affairs for the NGB, said: “The U.S. was trying to engage with the former communist nations that were in the Warsaw Pact, and using active duty troops might have been a little too offensive to the Russians or the folks that were in there, so the idea was to use the small footprint of National Guard troops." The "small footprint" also included an economic smallness. The Boehm source reports that "In the United States, it had been shown that operating a standing army costs 80 percent more than a reserve element.

The plan was considered complete in January (even though the best was yet to come). Conaway was able to write to Powell, "The National Guard stands ready to advise and assist in the formation of U.S.-style National Guard military structures in the countries of the former Soviet Union, the Baltic Republics and the former Warsaw Pact, and to assist authorities in cooperative self-help projects to enhance democratization and stabilization of the countries of the region." Powell replied on 24 January, "I appreciate your insights and offer of assistance. Your expertise will be invaluable as we enhance our contacts with the former Soviet-bloc countries."

In a conference of February 18, Conaway further explained that possible areas of cooperation included "civil affairs," and "teams for cooperative humanitarian or civic assistance projects." He suggested the employment of "personnel with civilian sector skills." These paternalistic goals went far beyond the usual combat role of soldiers and were not aptly described by "mil-to-mil contacts." To support them Conaway used the description "a decentralized system of deployable resources" without any necessary implication of military resources.

On April 1 Dick Cheney added "humanitarian assistance" and "crisis management" in an address to NATO at Brussels redefining U.S. goals for East Europe. He was careful to reassert that these were roles of the military: "Helping to build democracy through the appropriate roles for European militaries including civilian command, a hallmark of Western democracies." Some weeks after, the U.S. Embassy in Stockholm received a letter from the Latvian Deputy Minister of Defense, Valdis Pavlovskis, inviting USCOM to assist Latvia in implementing the deployable reserve.

The show was on, so to speak. It was to be presented to the three clients that November in a special visit of select top DoD officials to the Baltic capital cities. It was not complete yet, the most characteristic feature developing at the last moment. The NGB published a paper on November 4 referring to "the Baltic Initiative" of the JCPT. As a sort of afterthought, it suggested that each Baltic country be assigned a "partnership state," the Guard of which would take charge of mil-to-mil (or mil-to-civilian) exchanges. Shortly the suggestion became a full-blown proposal of the program, with Michigan to be assigned to Latvia, Pennsylvania to Lithuania, and less certainly New Jersey or New York to Estonia. Maryland was the final choice for Estonia, based on the existence of a large Estonian immigrant community there, who could provide bilinguals. The NGB called these relationships "sustaining partnerships."

In the last few weeks of November, 1992, a visitation of 38 interagency dignitaries alighted upon the Baltics by air with full authority to unroll the program as persuasively as they could. They had no authority to implement it. The delegation included Lieutenant General John Conaway, the Chief of the National Guard Bureau, and Brigadier General Thomas Lennon, head of the JCTP. They were very persuasive. All three Baltic states signed on enthusiastically, professing a readiness to start immediately. The delegation was not ready to start. First it must acquire authority from the United States Government, which, apparently, was cautiously testing their interest.

Encouraged by the success of the mission, the IWG approved the SPP on 27 January 1993. Subsequently, the DoD changed the traditional reserve role of the Guard for this case, to permit it to undertake "an active component mission." John Shalikashvili, head of EUCOM, briefed NATO and Russia's military, to avoid any sudden changes that might be misinterpreted. Having completed these steps, he added his approval in March. The State Department was asked to arrange the details through the ambassadors. Conaway gave the final NGB approval on April 27, after which the process, finally considered approved, moved rapidly. So far the dignitaries on both sides had planned and communicated but no active partnership had taken place.

Finally in April the first members of the MLT for Estonia arrived in Tallinn with members of the New York NG. The MLT for Latvia, including members of the Michigan NG, arrived in Riga in early May, a few days after the Estonian team in Tallinn. Uniformed Russians were still in the country. Some of the Estonian clients had recently been officers of the Soviet Union. The Lithuanian MLT was the last to arrive, in Vilnius, in mid-May, bringing a few members of the Pennsylvania NG. These delegates were planners. It was their task to set up joint events. The concept meanwhile was vending itself. By July 14 nine more paper partnerships were added, to be physically realized in 1994. They included three of the CIS: Kazakhstan, Ukraine, and Belarus. Later Belarus had second thoughts.

The non-paper beginning of the SPP as a distinct program therefore is counted by the major Internet military sources as April, 1993, with Estonia taking the lead by a few days. It was not the first effort in the collusion direction. It did modify the first effort, which was the JCTP. It had already taken practical measures the year before. A TCT had been sent to Hungary in October, 1992. An MLT was started in Poland in February, 1993. These early JCTP countries converted to the SPP in the summer of 1993, not necessarily with a change of personnel, as the institutions of the JCTP were turned to the SPP.

== Global expansion of the SPP ==
Having been recognized as a success under EUCOM, the SPP was in demand by other republics of the world in a variety of different security and humanitarian crises. The United States' response was to import the program to the five other Commands. Not all five existed at the time. The growth of the SPP is a sideshow (albeit an important one) of the growth of the new military signalled by the Goldwater-Nichols Act of 1986, which put aside a long but often troublesome military tradition in favor of centralization, quick response, efficiency of joint operations (which nearly all were) and accountability. The act was one substantive answer to all questions of imperial presidency or any quasi-autonomous functioning of military or intelligence units.

=== Reorganization of the military ===
The immediate trigger of the change was the Iran hostage crisis of 1979-1981, which began with the seizure of the American Embassy in Tehran by radical Islamic students (and others) contrary to International Law. On April 24, 1980, a military rescue operation was launched, Operation Eagle Claw, authorized by President Jimmy Carter, which never arrived in Tehran, but ended in the desert, with some accidental loss of life. The expedition was troubled by poor planning, bad communications, and bad luck. It did not have enough momentum to carry through. The failure ended the careers of the officers in charge, but the consequences reached much further.

The American public had before it a paradigm of how a hostage extraction should be conducted in Operation Entebbe on July 4, 1976. Airline passenger hostages were removed from an African airport after the defeat of their captors. The rescuing Israeli commandos simply flew into the airport in a surprise attack. The fact that their much more powerful and resourceful nation could not stage a reasonable facsimile was something of a scandal to Americans and a topic of ridicule to their allies. There were also rumors of inordinate spending, with inflated prices being set for everyday cheap items.

The new President Reagan did not hesitate. In 1981 he initiated a from-the-ground-up investigation of the entire military by the Packard Commission. They were to look into the root causes of inefficiency and ineffectiveness and make recommendations to remedy them. They finished in 1985. Their recommendations were incorporated into the Goldwater-Nichols Act of 1986.

The Packard Commission reported that the lack of communication and lack of cooperation came from a lack of "a rational system" rather than from criminal conspiracy or incompetence. Their analysis was primarily a business one, which was to be expected, as their numbers were culled from corporate leaders. In business, questions of system are primarily addressed by changing the management. In the DoD the management were the service chiefs, whose acronyms were preceded by CINC, "commander-in-chief." The Commission was recommending that they be taken out of the chain of command, popularly known as being "fired," and replaced by a "rational system."

Accordingly, the Goldwater-Nichols Act summarized the independent actions of units that were supposed to be operating jointly under the terms "inter-service rivalry." Because of it, no joint system could be developed. As remedy, it altered the regular chain of command of the services by removing the Joint Chiefs of Staff from it.

Henceforward the former commanders of the armed services were to be only an advisory body to the President. The term CINC was dropped. Their importance in strategic planning was just as great as ever. Their authority, however, had been centralized and placed in another. The CJCS was made the President's chief military advisor. The Chief of the National Guard Bureau also was made a joint chief, taking away his command of the Guard and rendering him into an advisor. The NGB does not "command" the NG.

The President alone was not given the additional power quasi-imperial. The post of Secretary of Defense was strengthened into the actual commander of the DoD. He (or she) must accept orders from the President. The President must have a Secretary of Defense, and must command through him. He must have been a civilian for at least seven years. Appointment to the position is subject to Congressional approval.
