= State Partnership Program Coordinator =

A State Partnership Program Coordinator is a full-time United States national guardsman (person) that manages the partnership between his state and the country his state is partnered with through the National Guard State Partnership Program. The National Guard Bureau provides guidance to the states participating in the program, but the program is primarily managed by a State Partnership Program and a bilateral affairs officer, normally a full-time national guardsman or other military officer assigned to the geographic combatant command and under the direction of the U.S. embassy in the partner country.

State Partnership Program activities are planned collaboratively by the State Partnership Program coordinators, the bilateral affairs officers, the U.S. embassy country teams, and the geographic combatant commands. The State Partnership Program assists the State J7 officer with all plans, orders, and back-briefs related to the EUCOM State Partnership Program to ensure an understanding and a common operational picture of all State Partnership Program activities. This individual is responsible for the preparation of all activities including exchanges and senior leader visits. He or she coordinates and de-conflicts timelines and synchronizes events to execute focused operations for all elements of a partnership event. The coordinator assists the J7 Officer in advising the adjutant general and assistant adjutant general of a state on capabilities, posture, and employment of resources related to the State Partnership Program.
