= Vermont–North Macedonia National Guard Partnership =

Vermont-North Macedonia State Partnership
- Part of the U.S. European Command State Partnership Program
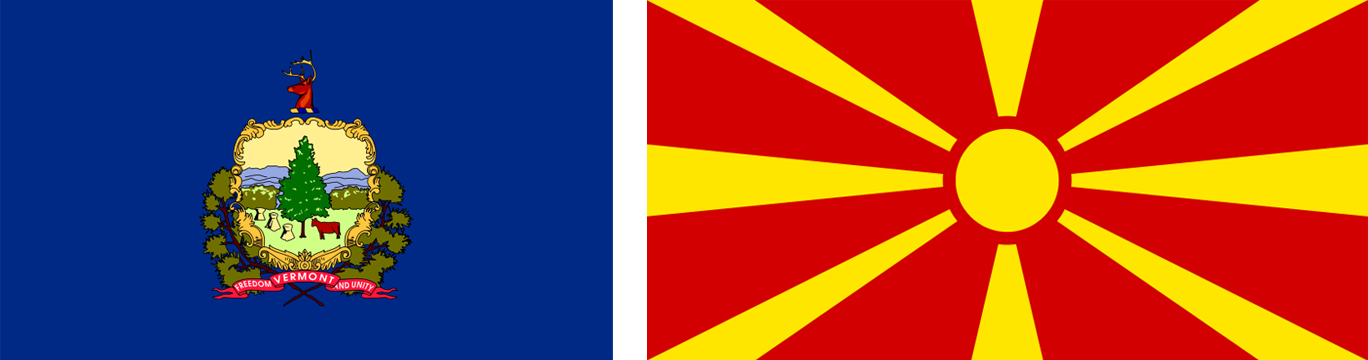
- Origin: 1993
- Country president: Gjorge Ivanov
- Prime minister: Nikola Gruevski
- Minister of defense: Talat Dzaferi
- Ambassador to U.S.: Zoran Jolevski
- Ambassador to Macedonia: Paul D. Wohlers
- Adjutant general: Major General Steven A. Cray
- 2012 Engagements: 17
- NATO member: Yes(2020)
- EU member: No

North Macedonia

The Vermont–North Macedonia National Guard Partnership is one of 25 European partnerships that make-up the U.S. European Command State Partnership Program and one of 88 worldwide partnerships that make-up the National Guard State Partnership Program. The partnership between the Vermont National Guard (VTNG) and the Army of the Republic of North Macedonia (ARM) has flourished since its establishment in 1993. In 2012, the VTNG was awarded the Macedonian Military Order of Merit by President Gjorge Ivanov, in appreciation of VTNG's commitment to the ARM. Vermont continues to support Macedonia's armed forces as their professionalism and capability increase.

== History ==
- 79 Macedonian soldiers co-deployed with the 86th IBCT (MTN) in OEF X.
- The President of North Macedonia visited Vermont in September 2009.
- In 2012, President of North Macedonia awarded Vermont National Guard with highest military decoration, the Military Order of Merit.
- 15 Military-to-Military (M2M) events scheduled for completion in 2013, to include the 2013 NATO Comprehensive Operations Planning Division (COPD) Logistical Exercise 2013, which will be held in North Macedonia.
- Contention with Greece over constitutional name continues to challenge acceptance into EU/NATO.

== Partnership focus ==
The focus of the partnership is accession into NATO and the EU.

Military to Military (M2M):

- Continued commitment to reaching Security Cooperation Goals
- Continued support for Non-Lethal Weapon capability and PKO deployments
- Support ARM Transformations for 2015 (Med Inf Btl Grp)
- Trilateral engagements (Vermont, North Macedonia, Senegal)

2013 events include Operational Logistics, National Defense Organization and Cyber Security.

== Gallery ==
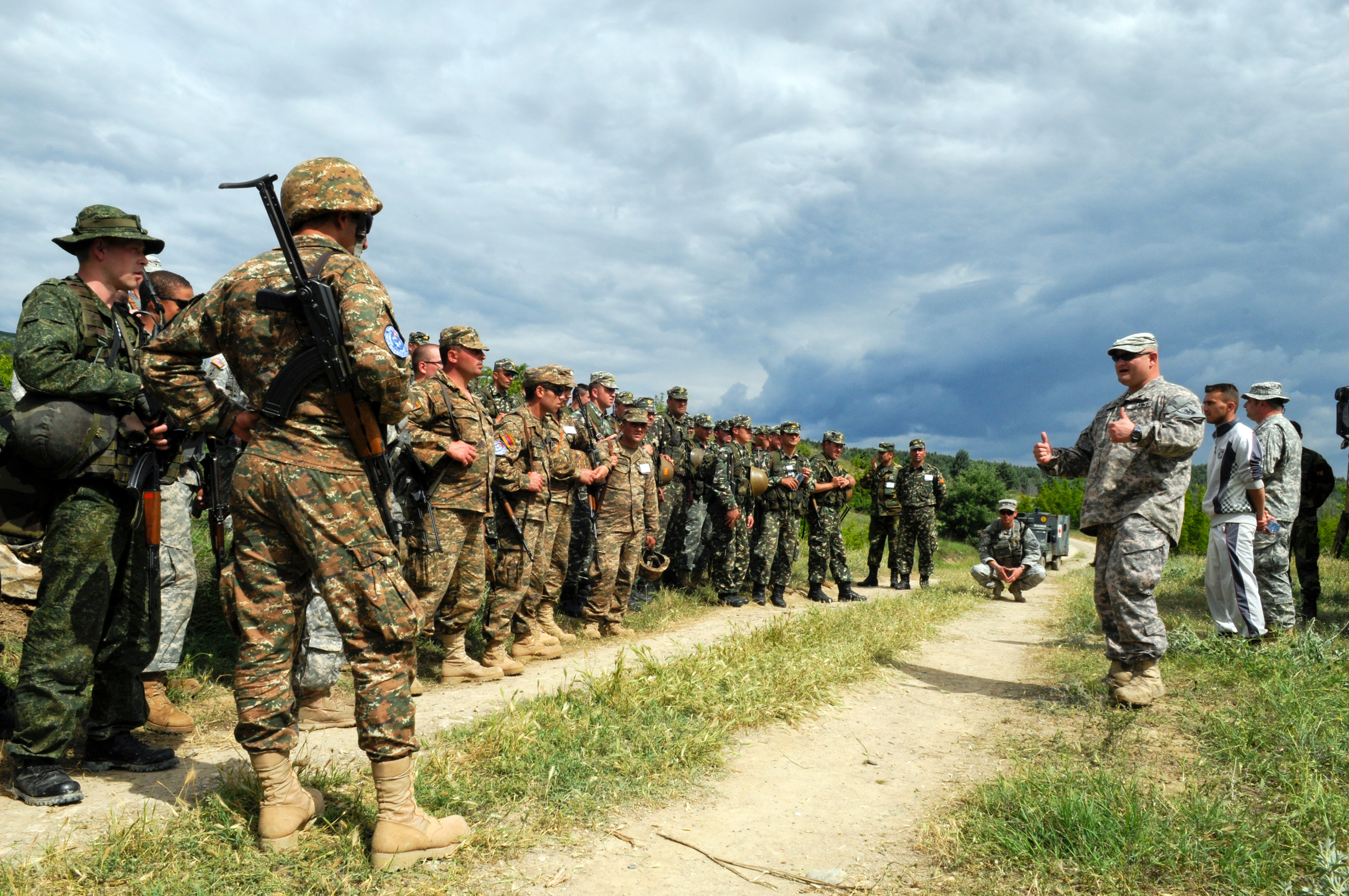
An officer from the Vermont Army National Guard provides After Action Reporting comments to American, Armenian, Belarusian and Macedonian soldiers at the Krivolak Training Area in the Republic of Macedonia.

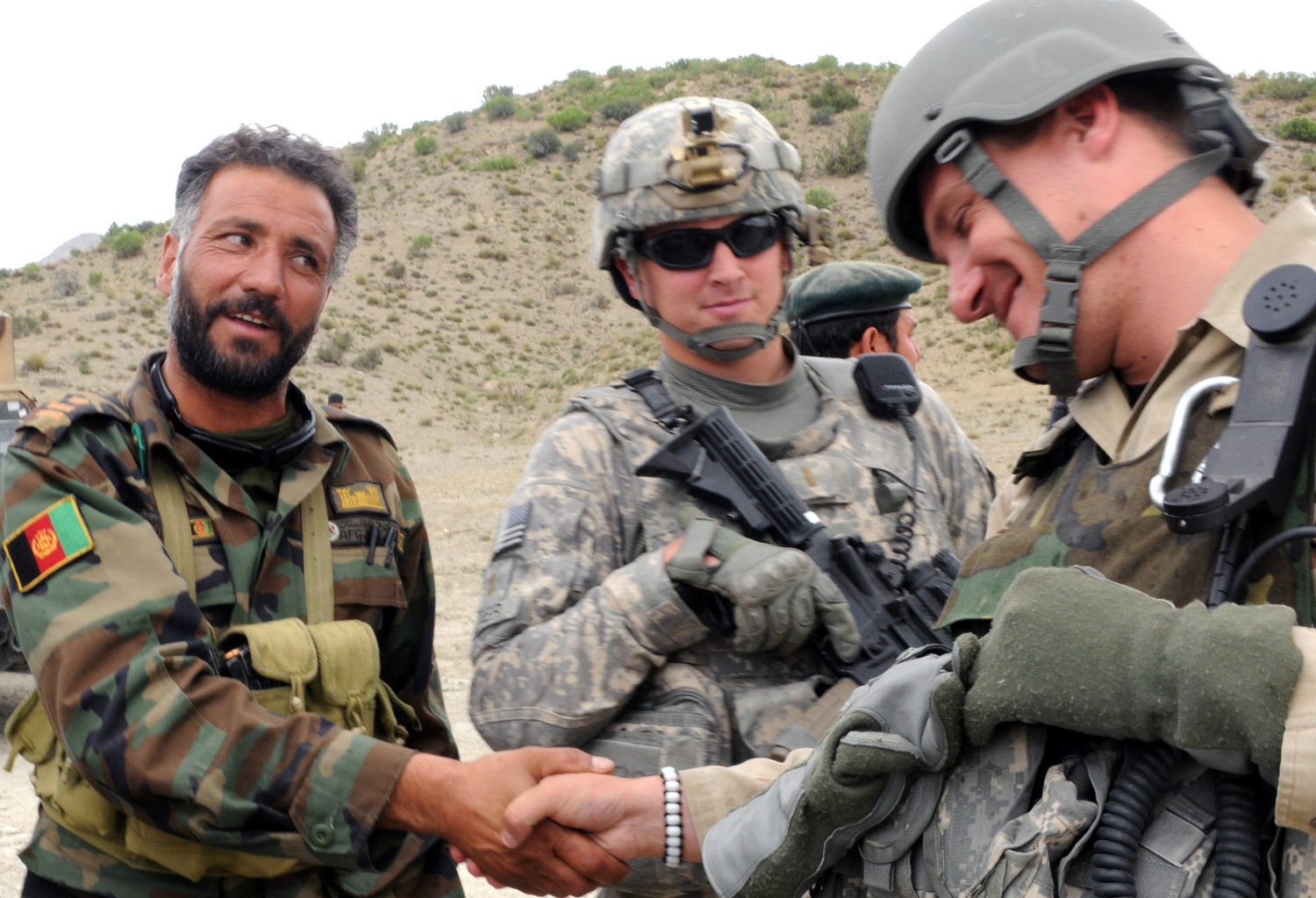
A Macedonian Soldier shakes hands with an Afghan National Army Soldier.

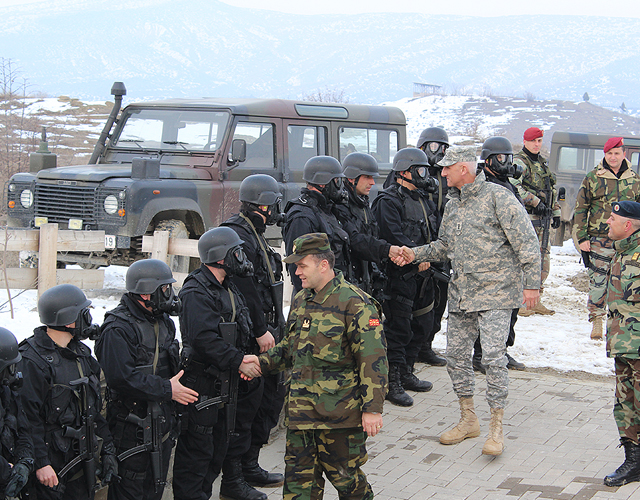
LTG Mark P. Hertling, U.S. Army Europe Commander, congratulates Macedonian troops following a training demonstration in Macedonia.

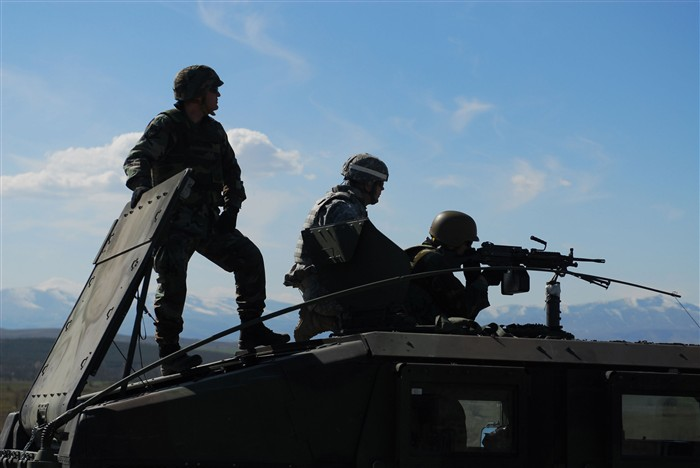
A Macedonian Soldier takes aim during a crew-served weapons range in Macedonia while a U.S. and Macedonian Soldier looks on.

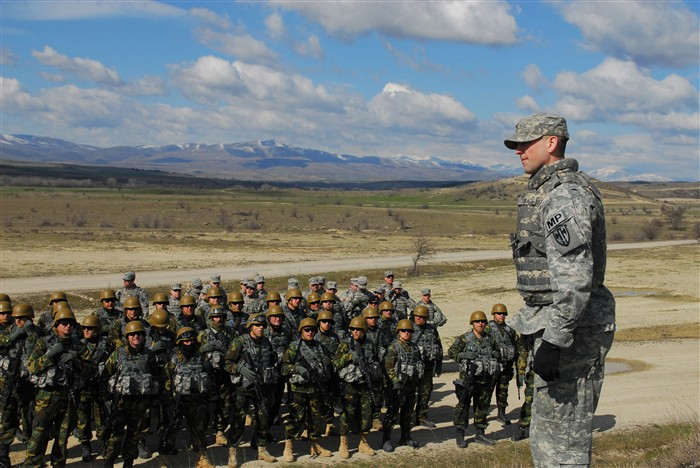
A U.S. military police officer addresses Macedonian and U.S. troops during a safety brief in Macedonia.
