= New Jersey–Albania National Guard Partnership =

New Jersey–Albania State Partnership
- Part of the U.S. European Command State Partnership Program
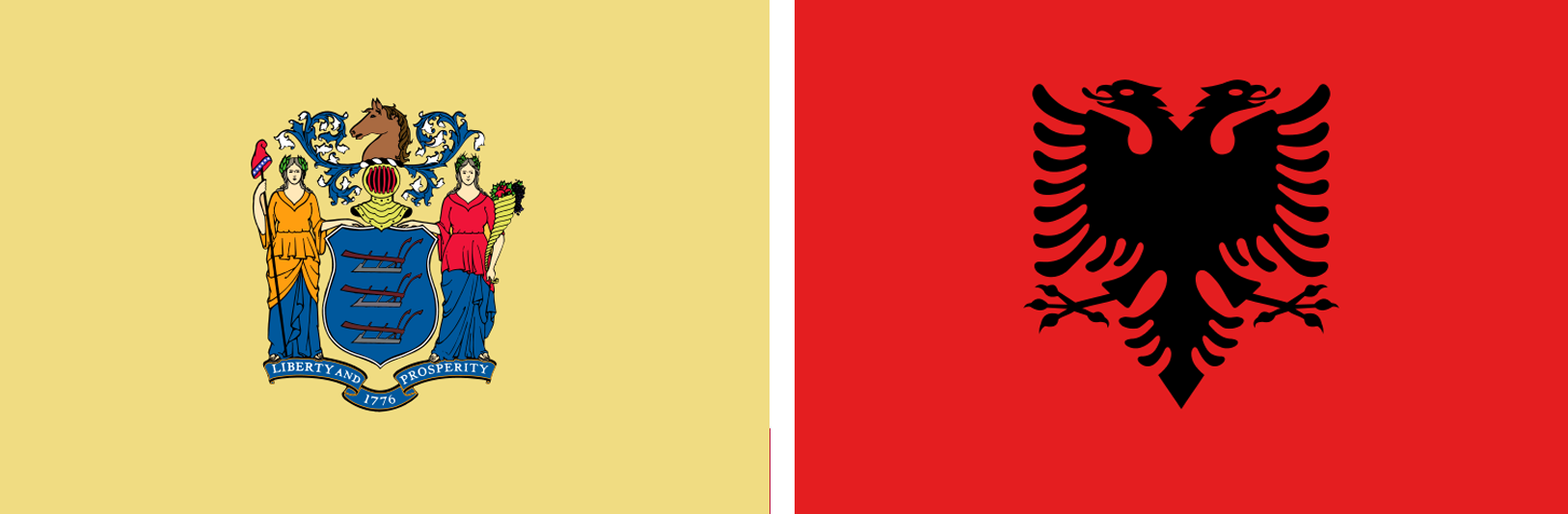
- Origin: 2001
- Country president: Bajram Begaj
- Prime minister: Edi Rama
- Minister of defense: Niko Peleshi
- Ambassador to U.S.: Floreta Faber
- Ambassador to Albania: Yuri Kim
- Adjutant general: Lisa J. Hou
- 2012 Engagements: 5
- NATO member: Yes (2009)
- EU member: No

Albania

The New Jersey–Albania National Guard Partnership is one of 25 European partnerships that make up the U.S. European Command State Partnership Program and one of 88 worldwide partnerships that make-up the National Guard State Partnership Program. The partnership was established in 1993. The current M2M focus places emphasis on OCO support, NCO Development, Military Medical pre/post deployment medical care, Military Police mentoring, military support to civil authority and disaster response.

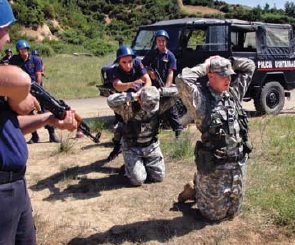
Albanian MPs search soldiers from the New Jersey National Guard during a training exercise.

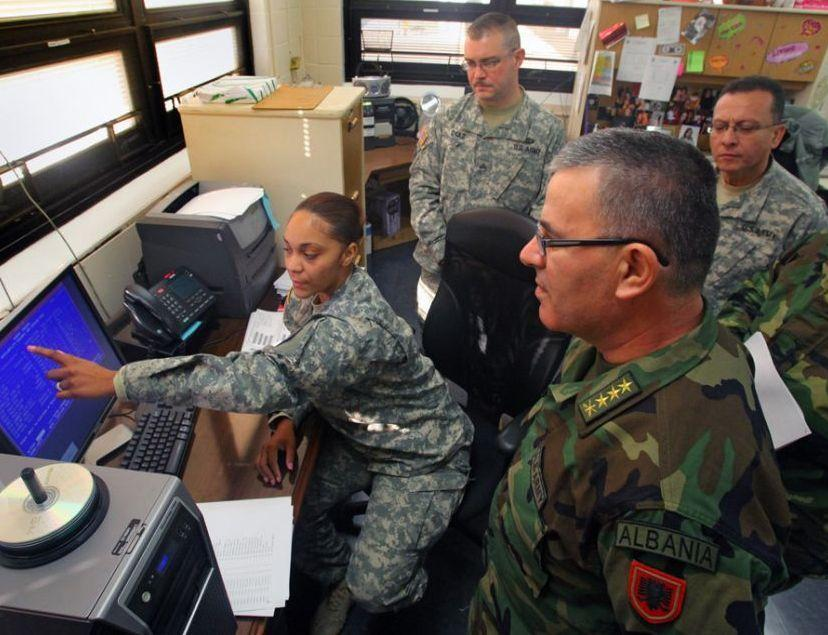
A soldier from the New Jersey National Guard explains the Standard Army Retail Supply System to a Logistic Brigade Commander with the Albanian Army

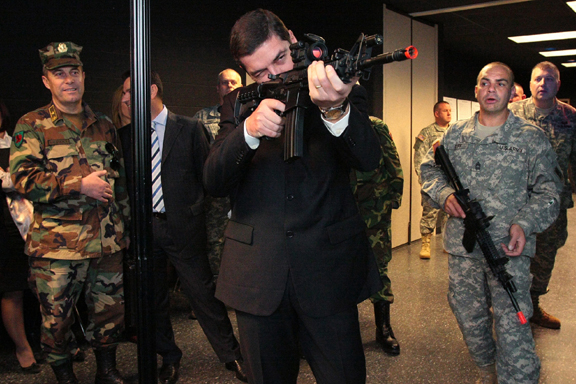
The Minister of Defense of Albania takes aim on the Virtual Interactive Combat Environment

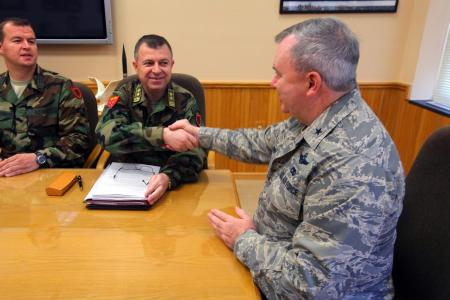
The Adjutant General of New Jersey shakes hands with the Chief of Defense, Albanian armed forces, during a meeting in New Jersey

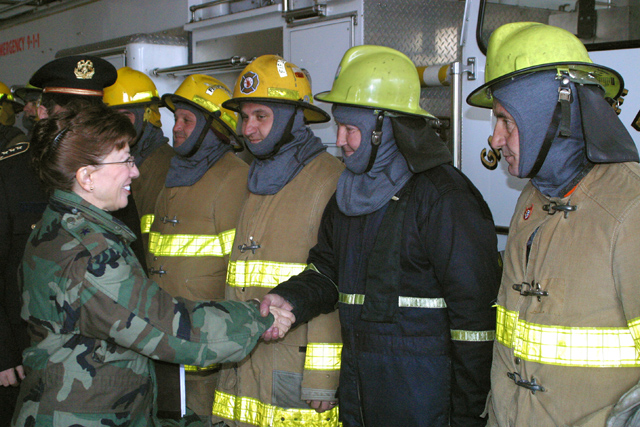
Brig. Gen. Maria Falca-Dodson (left) shakes hands with Albanian firefighters during a ceremony in which the New Jersey-Albania State Partnership Program donated a fire truck to the Albanian Fire Rescue Services Department.

== History ==
- NATO accession in 2009
- 2010 Visa Liberalization allowed Albanians to travel throughout the EU
- The latter part of 2010, conscription ended changing the nature of the AAF, with ramifications for training and development of the Force
- Albania to get EU candidate status provided it delivers key reforms in the judiciary, public administration and the functioning of parliament.
- Political instability- supporters of the Prime Minister Sali Berisha and opposition leader Edi Rama (Mayor of Tirana) have faced off in the past
- U.S. Ambassador to Albania warns of rise in nationalist rhetoric during elections
- More Parliamentary elections set for June 23, 2013
- Unexploded Ordnance program is a huge success (13 tons annually) and remains a priority for the US Embassy

== Partnership focus ==
Over 100 NJNG to AAF events have been conducted since the partnership began with an emphasis in NCO /Officer Corps Development, Logistics, Medical and MP. The focus for 2013-2015 is a continued expansion of the NCO / Officer Corps professionalism and the expansion of Response to Natural and Man-made Disasters, and IG development. The partnership has assisted in the Preparation of multiple AAF teams for deployment, to include: OMLT/MAT 1-4, MP, medical and EAGLE teams.

Focus of Military-to-Military events:

- Develop SPP to play larger role in ODC’s programs
- Expand to regional events – Adriatic 5 country exercises
- Focus NJ units inclusion as partner on ODT opportunities

2013 Planned Events:

- Human Resource Development
- Operational Logistics Capabilities
- Civil Support Team Capabilities
- Disaster Response planning and Capabilities
- Officer Commissioning Program
- Senior Leader Interagency Engagements
- Pre-Deployment Capabilities
- Material Management
- Military Police Deployed Operations
- Wild Land Fire Management
