= Maryland–Bosnia and Herzegovina National Guard Partnership =

Maryland–Bosnia and Herzegovina State Partnership
- Part of the U.S. European Command State Partnership Program
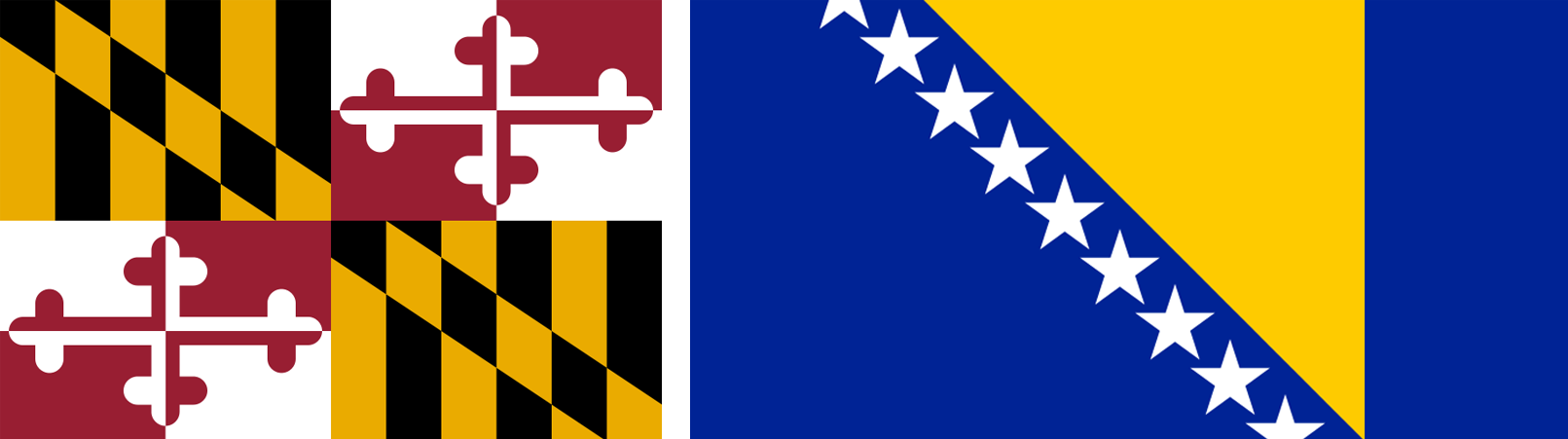
- Flags of Maryland and Bosnia and Herzegovina
- Origin: 2003
- Country president: dr. Mladen Ivanić
- Minister of defense: Zekerijah Osmić
- Ambassador to U.S.: Jadranka Negodic
- Ambassador to Bosnia and Herzegovina: Patrick Moon
- Adjutant general: MG Linda L. Singh
- 2012 Engagements: 19
- NATO member: No
- EU member: No

Bosnia and Herzegovina

The Maryland–Bosnia and Herzegovina National Guard Partnership is one of 25 European partnerships that make-up the U.S. European Command State Partnership Program and one of 88 worldwide partnerships that make-up the National Guard State Partnership Program. The partnership was established in 2003 and has become integral to Bosnia and Herzegovina's post-war military integration and in their ongoing NATO accession process. The current focus is on a joint-deployment to Afghanistan, AT exchanges with key BiH units, and supporting BiH's NATO Partnership for Peace goals.

== History ==
The Bosnian War ended in 1995 with the signing of the Dayton Accord, which is still the constitutional document. The army integrated in 2006. Bosnia and Herzegovina was given a conditional NATO Membership Action Plan (MAP) in 2010. The country had not met the condition on defense property.

The Armed Forces are the most integrated, most effective national institution in Bosnia, but have been negatively affected by political tumult.

Bosnia and Herzegovina is unique in the European area of responsibility (AOR) in its internal political paralysis due to fundamental differences between its constituent "ethnicities" over what the country should look like. Though conflict is unlikely, in its current state, Bosnia is "virtually ungovernable" with no sign of agreement on reforms necessary to change that.

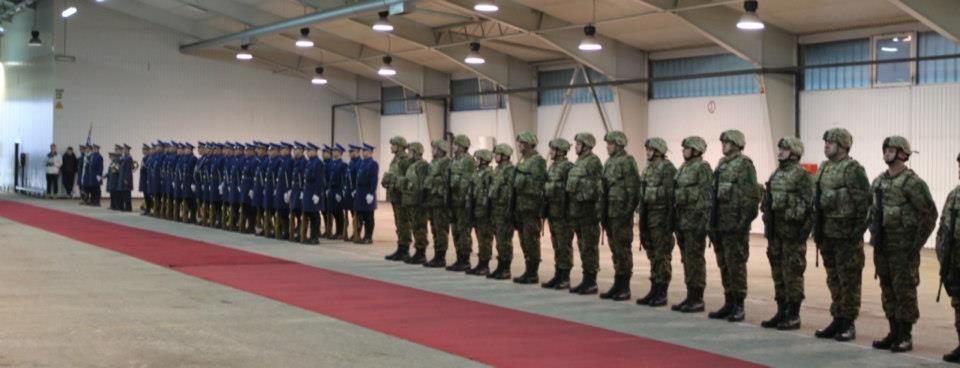
A send-off ceremony for 26 BiH Military Police soldiers who are deploying in support of ISAF together with the Maryland National Guard 115th MP Battalion.

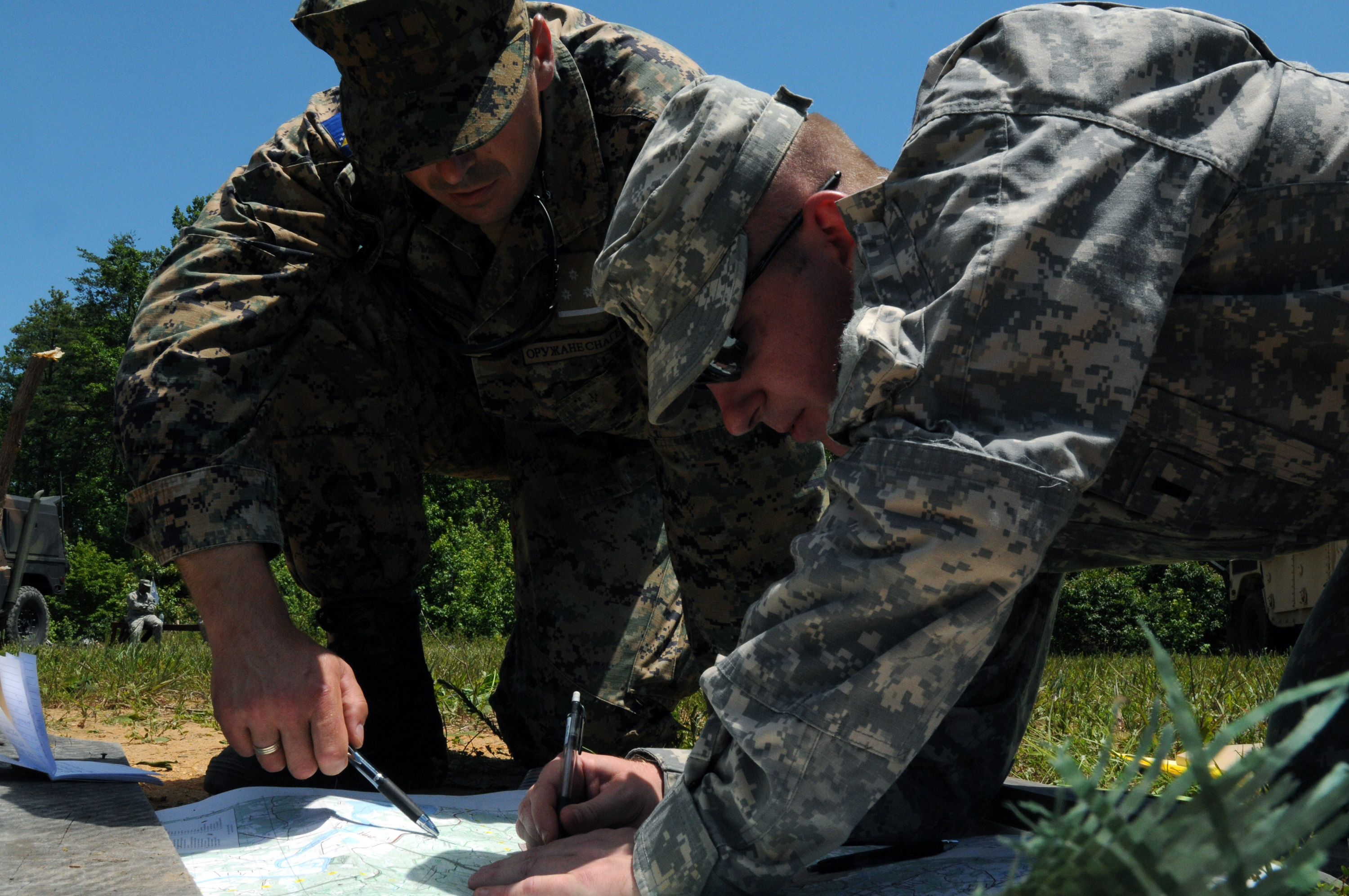
Soldiers from Bosnia and the Maryland Army National Guard plot out features on a map in order to complete a sand table for a combat lane exercise during training at Fort A.P. Hill, Va., June 15, 2012.

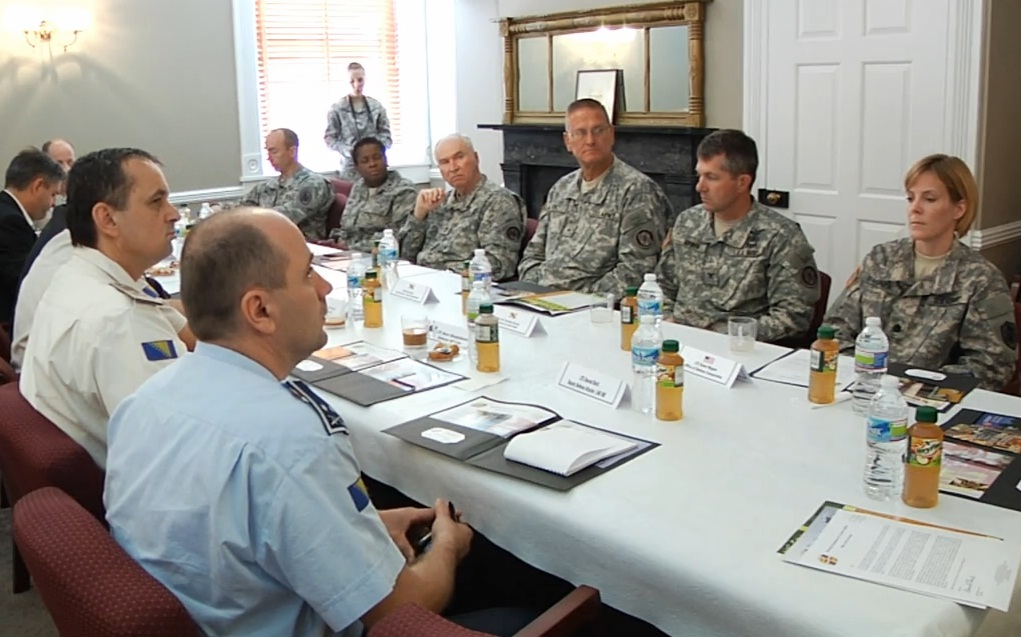
The Maryland National Guard hosts Bosnian Minister of Defense and Chief of Defense during a visit to Camp Fretterd Military Reservation, June 2012. The group met to speak about the future of the SPP and how it strengthens the relationship between Bosnia and Herzegovina, Maryland and the United States.

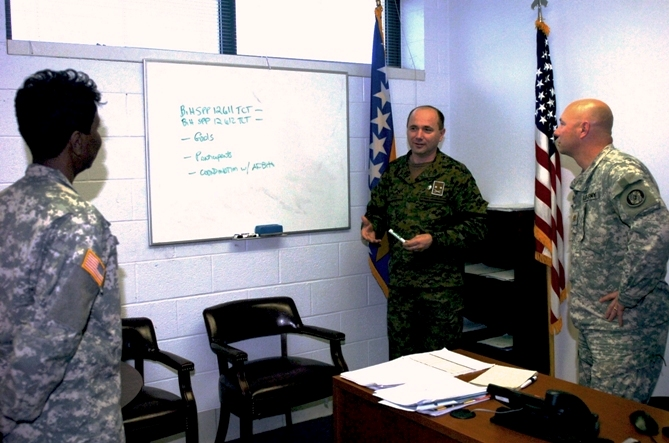
LTC Dzevad Buric, Maryland's first liaison to Bosnia, discusses an upcoming training event with a soldier from Bosnia.

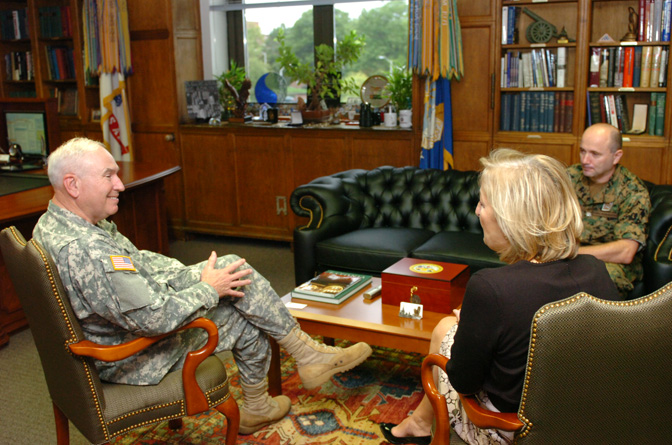
Bosnia's Ambassador to the U.S. visits the Maryland National Guard and speaks to Maryland's Adjutant General to ensure the lasting partnership between Bosnia and Maryland.

== Partnership focus ==
In 2013, future focus for the partnership was established. These included to see through an embedded-deployment between Maryland National Guard (MDNG) Military Police and Armed Forces of Bosnia and Herzegovina (AFBiH) Military Police, including staff officers and PSD, to expand the Unit Level Exchanges occurring between AFBiH and MDNG during unit ATs to increase US-BiH interoperability, and to look to expand "whole-of-government" cooperation through actions like Relations/Security Studies student exchanges.

Planned events for 2013 were multiple TCTs based on Bosnian PARP goals, and an expanded slate of ULFs, with at least one occurring in Bosnia and Herzegovina.
