= Bilateral Affairs Officer =

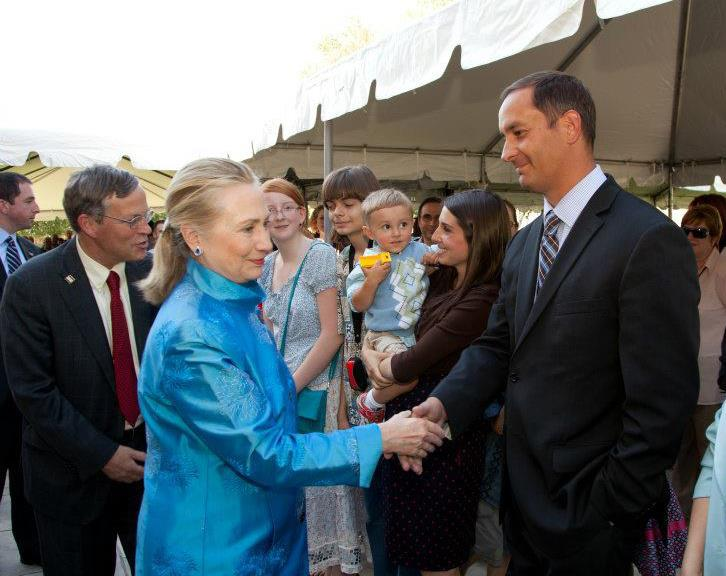
Secretary Clinton shaking hands with the Bilateral Affairs Officer of Armenia during a visit to the US Embassy in Yerevan

A Bilateral Affairs Officer is a United States Army or Air National Guard officer serving as a conduit between the state and a 'partner country' as part of the National Guard State Partnership Program. The position is considered a diplomatic level assignment.

The Bilateral Affairs Officer functions as a security cooperation action officer and forward National Guard Liaison Officer, representing the interests of the respective National Guard. The Bilateral Affairs Office (and/or TCA Coordinator) works for the COCOM (Combatant Command) and for the Embassy's Office of Defense Cooperation. Though the National Guard Bureau funds this position, the Bilateral Affairs Officer will be under the direction of the Office of Defense Cooperation in the partner country.

Furthermore, the Bilateral Affairs Officer coordinates with the State Partnership Director for State Partnership Program events and National Guard forces to participate in military-to-military events. As a result, the positions of Bilateral Affairs Officer and State Partnership Director are mutually supportive.

== Qualifications ==
To find the most qualified individuals for the job, Bilateral Affairs Officer candidates are stringently screened and boarded and, in some cases, personally interviewed by the state Adjutant General.

Candidates must be 'promotable' Captains and Majors. Other criteria for selection are:

- Operations and logistics staff experience (or equivalent)
- Overseas duty training experience
- Varied and extensive staff and operational experience at the battalion/squadron, and brigade/group levels
- Knowledge of State Partnership Program
- Served as commander of a company/flight and/or battalion/squadron sized unit
- Proven organizational experience in handling multiple tasks
- Proven capacity to coordinate and facilitate events
- Proven communications skills (oral and written)
- Knowledge of diplomatic protocol
- Military deployment/Combat experience

== Duties ==
The duties of the Bilateral Affairs Office encompass the core of the planning, coordination of schedules, execution of Traveling Contact Teams, Familiarization Visits and Special State Partnership Program Events. Duties include:

1. Responsibility for the safe, effective and lawful conduct of all State Partnership Program events.
2. Supervision of all US military and civilian personnel performing duties in the HN under the auspices of State Partnership Program.
3. Acting as the Office of Defense Coordinator in his/her absence.
4. Maintaining a schedule of planned events by Quarter.
5. Maintaining an event file on each scheduled State Partnership Program event including the event checklist.
6. Acting as Point of Contact for the Office of Defense Coordinator for all State Partnership Program events.
7. Coordinating with Points of Contact assigned to receive HN personnel for Familiarization Visits.
8. Acting as main Point of Contact with State Partner for the State Partnership Program.
9. Managing events to insure continuing response to HN requirements.
10. Ensuring follow-up actions are completed upon the conclusion of each event: After Action Reports, update the Historical File, close out of the active event file and develop follow-on events.
11. Maintaining communication with the Long-Range Planner, Regional Program Manager and component desk officers of USEUCOM.
12. Coordinating HN employee activities.
13. Coordinating the activities of the HN Liaison Officer.
14. Coordinating logistics requirements for all State Partnership Program events.
15. Coordinating procurement of Visas for HN nationals with required embassies for conduct of State Partnership Program business, if required.
16. Developing Concept Sheets.
17. Coordinating In-Country Planning Conference with the Long-Range Planner and Office of Defense Coordinator.
18. Maintaining communication and coordination with the State Partnership Program State.

== Training ==
As part of their initial training, Bilateral Affairs Officers are required to attend the Security Cooperation Management – Overseas Course at the Defense Institute of Security Cooperation Studies (DISCS) School located in Wright-Patterson AFB, Ohio. The Security Cooperation Management – Overseas Course is a two-week course that provides a functional knowledge of: security cooperation, security assistance policies, procedures for; US personnel with assignments to overseas Security Cooperation Organizations, Defense Attaché Offices, COCOM's and their component elements. As an integral part of their studies students are acquainted with: current issues in US foreign policy and international affairs, United States Government business management practices in Foreign Military Sales and a full spectrum of security cooperation programs.

The Bilateral Affairs Officer also receives training in a myriad of other subjects, including: International Military Education & Training, Humanitarian Assistance Programs, Military-to-Military Event Planning Cycle, Military-to-Military Event Execution and Military-to-Military Order Procedures. However, training for each COCOM slightly varies and may depend on a particular area or type of project that the COCOM is focused on. Training for these types of programs are provided by the COCOM and are part of the tool-kit the Bilateral Affairs Officer needs in order to execute their mission.
