= Von Firmian =

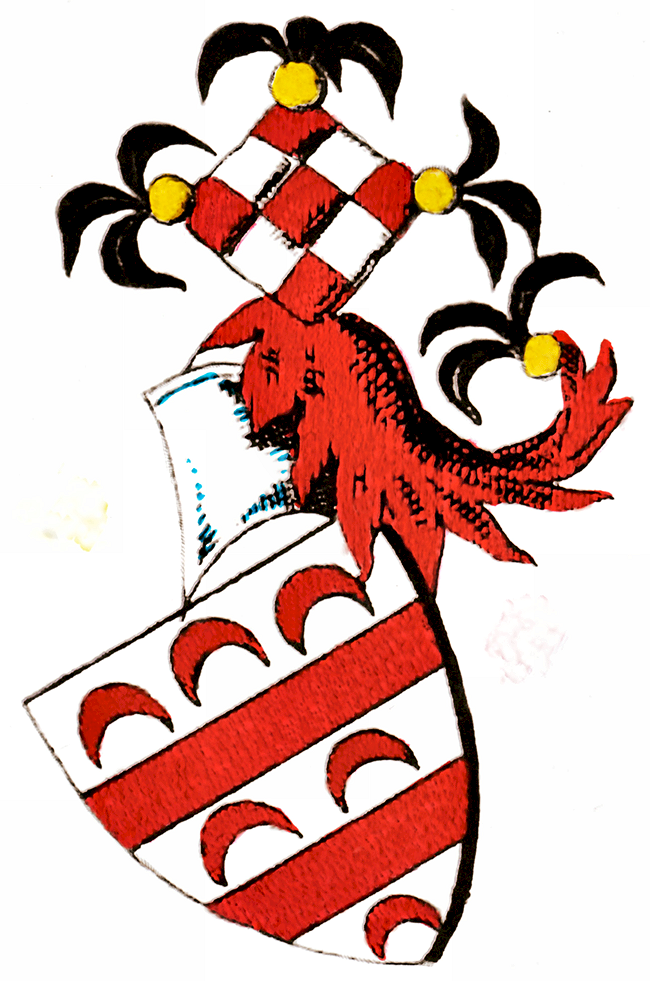
Coat of arms of the noble Firmian family

The Firmian family or von Firmian is an old South Tyrolean noble family that gave several Bishops to the Church. Members of the family held the title of Count in the Austro-Hungarian Empire.

== Notable members ==
- Karl Joseph von Firmian (1716–1782), Austrian noble, Plenipotentiary of Lombardy to the Austrio-Hungarian Empire
- Leopold Anton von Firmian (1679–1744), Bishop of Lavant, Bishop of Seckau and Prince-Archbishop of Salzburg
- Leopold Ernst von Firmian (1708–1783), Austrian bishop and cardinal
- Leopold Maximilian von Firmian (1766–1831), Bishop of Lavant, Archbishop of Salzburg

== See also ==
- Nick de Firmian (born 1957), American chess player and Grandmaster
- Firman
- Firmiana
- Firmin
