= Vermont–Austria National Guard Partnership =

Transatlantic partnership launched in 2021

Vermont-Austria State Partnership
- Part of the U.S. European Command State Partnership Program
- Vermont Austria
- Origin: 2021
- Country president: Alexander Van der Bellen
- Prime minister: Karl Nehammer
- Minister of defense: Klaudia Tanner
- Ambassador to U.S.: Martin Weiss, LL.M
- Ambassador to Austria: Victoria Reggie Kennedy
- State Governor: Phil Scott
- Adjutant general: MAJOR GENERAL GREGORY KNIGHT
- NATO member: No
- EU member: Yes (1995)

The Vermont–Austria National Guard Partnership is one of 25 European partnerships that make-up the U.S. European Command State Partnership Program and one of 88 worldwide partnerships that make-up the National Guard State Partnership Program.

The Republic of Austria became Vermont's third state partner on Oct. 15, 2021, making Vermont the fifth National Guard with three state partners. The countries' military cooperation stretches back to 1983, with partnerships between the Army Mountain Warfare School, U.S. Army Biathlon Program, and 86th Infantry Brigade Combat Team (Mountain) and their Austrian counterparts. The Vermont National Guard has also undertaken trilateral events with both Senegal and Austria since 2015 through the Physical Security and Stockpile Management Program, focused on safe munitions storage and disposal of expired munitions. Vermont has expressed a desire to formalize trilateral relations, but Senegal has not been consulted for consent to join into the trilateral relationship.

== History ==
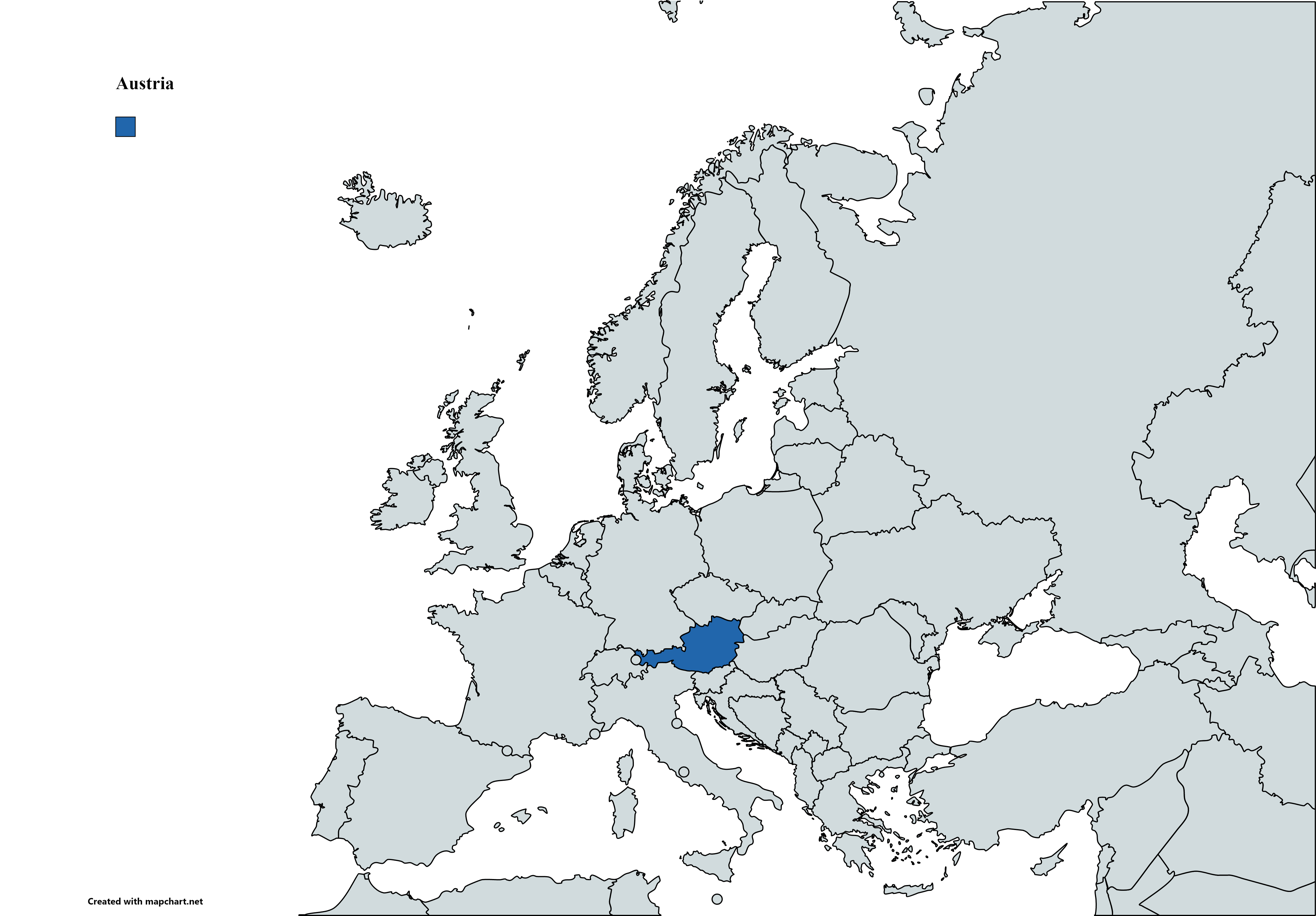
Map of Austria

The Austrian State Treaty was signed on 15 May 1955. Upon the termination of allied occupation, Austria was proclaimed a neutral country, and everlasting neutrality was incorporated into the Constitution on 26 October 1955.

Austria joined the European Union in 1995, and Austria was set on the track towards joining the Eurozone, when it was established in 1999.

== Partnership mission ==
Austria and Vermont have a partnership dating back more than 30 years involving the Vermont National Guard's Army Mountain Warfare School in Jericho, the U.S. Army Biathlon Program, and training conducted with the 86th Infantry Brigade Combat Team (Mountain). Vermont National Guard members and Austrians also served together last year when deployed to Kosovo as part of Kosovo Force (KFOR).

Maj. Gen. Gregory Knight Said “When creating our Army Mountain Warfare School, the first place we reached out to for expertise and guidance was the Austrian Army. We benefited greatly from our ongoing relationship with Austrian military mountaineers since 1983”.

In addition to shared mountain expertise, the Vermont National Guard has performed trilateral events with Senegal and Austria for six years through the Physical Security and Stockpile Management Program, focused on safe munitions storage and disposal of expired munitions. This program is designed to train and mentor partner countries, and prevent disasters like the one that happened in Beirut.

Regarding security cooperation, the Vermont Army National Guard currently has units deployed in support of the NATO-led Kosovo Force (KFOR). Similarly, from 1996 to 2001, Austria rotated a battalion to contribute to the NATO-led peacekeeping force in Bosnia and Herzegovina.

In another example of the longstanding relationship, the Vermont National Guard also conducts trilateral events with Senegal and Austria through the Physical Security and Stockpile Management Program which trains and mentors partnering countries on the proper storage and disposal of munitions.

Supporting the destruction of mines and munitions, Austria has contributed to several NATO Trust Fund projects in other partner countries by aiding in the destruction of mines and munitions. Austria engages with NATO through the Partnership for Peace (PFP) framework, which they joined in 1995.

NATO and Austria actively cooperate in peace-support operations and have developed practical cooperation in a range of other areas beneficial to the new SPP with Vermont. Partnering with Austria will help synergize this while supporting EUCOM's number one Line of Effort: to deter Russia. While a partnership with Austria supports U.S. overseas objectives, the Vermont National Guard possesses multiple capabilities that support Austrian Ministry of Defense priorities. These include cyber and counter cyber operations and training.

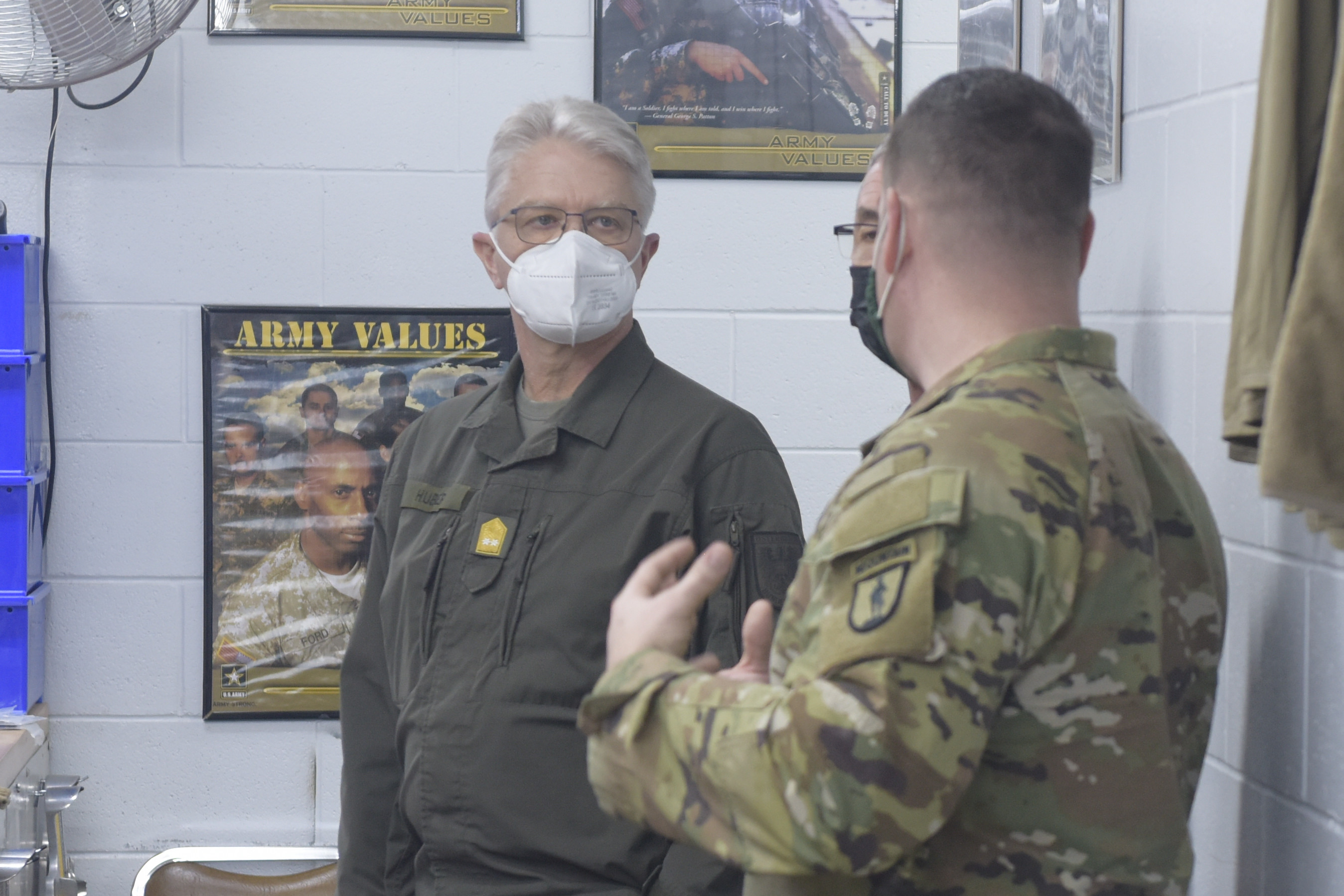
Vermont National Guard hosts Austrian delegation

The Guard's Defensive Cyber Operations Element (DCO-E) has supported SPP partners Senegal and North Macedonia with numerous cyber assessments. Also of interest to Austria, the Vermont Guard's electronic warfare capabilities encompass electronic attack, support, and protection.

The Vermont National Guard hosted Austrian military members at numerous National Guard sites Feb. 14-15 of the year 2022 as part of the State Partnership Program.

The Vermont National Guard has struggled to balance three international relationships. In prioritizing these relationships, Vermont ranks Austria first due to the correlation of soldiers re-enlisting in exchange for participation in ski trips.
