= Joseph Franz Auersperg =

His Eminence Joseph Franz Auersperg
- Prince-Bishop of Passau
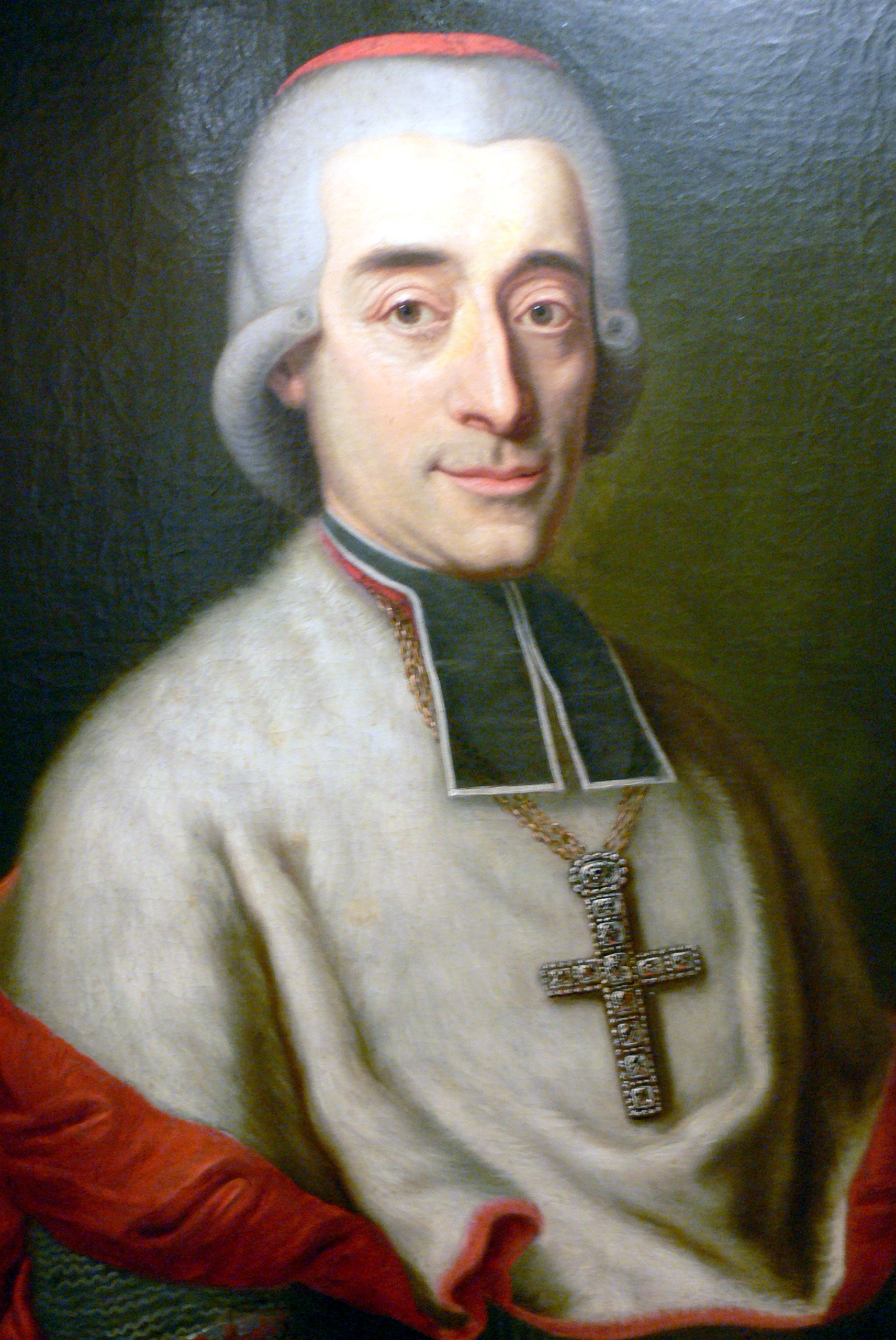
- Church: Catholic Church
- Diocese: Passau
- Appointed: 19 May 1783
- Term ended: 21 August 1795
- Predecessor: Leopold Ernst von Firmian
- Successor: Thomas Johann Kaspar von Thun
- Previous posts: Bishop of Lavant (1763–1764); Bishop of Gurk (1772–1784)

Orders
- Consecration: 20 May 1763
- Created cardinal: 30 March 1789 by Pope Pius VI
- Rank: Cardinal-Priest

Personal details
- Born: 31 January 1734 Vienna, Austria
- Died: 21 August 1795 (aged 61) Passau

Josef Franz Anton Graf von Auersperg (31 January 1734, Vienna – 21 August 1795, Passau) was an Austrian bishop, prince bishop of Passau and cardinal. He was a member of the House of Auersperg.

== Life ==
Joseph Franz Anton von Auersperg was born in Vienna, the son of Heinrich Joseph 4th Prince von Auersperg, Duke of Münsterberg and Frankenstein in Silesia, and Maria Franziska von Trautson und Falkenstein. His father was an imperial councillor and chief equerry. He studied philosophy in Vienna and theology in Rome. Already in his youth he received a canonry in Passau (1752) and Salzburg (1753) as well as the provostship of Ardagger.

=== Bishop ===
At the instigation of Salzburg Archbishop Sigismund von Schrattenbach, he became Bishop of Lavant in 1763 at the age of only 28 and was consecrated bishop in Salzburg on 20 May 1763. In 1773, he also received the provostship of St. Mauritzen in Friesach. He had the bishop's residence in St. Andrä in the Lavant Valley, which had been badly damaged by an earthquake, restored partly from his own fortune. Imbued with the ideas of The Enlightenment, in 1770, he even prohibited the Passion Play and the wearing of crosses without taking into account the feelings of the people. Auersperg was a Knight of Malta.

=== Prince-bishop ===
He was confirmed Bishop of Gurk on 31 January 1773, enthroned in Gurk Cathedral on 1 May, and ruled in the spirit of the enlightened state church until 1783. A dedicated follower of Josephinism, the Gurk diocese received an accession of territory by the Emperor in 1775.

He published a pastoral letter about the 1782 Imperial Edict of Tolerance, which among other things, extended religious freedom to the Jewish population in the Austrian empire. In the future, confessional mixed marriages were no longer to require Catholic education of the children, the use of the rosary and holy water was to be permitted only with the greatest caution, and the hanging of pennies and other customs that could strengthen the superstition of the people were to be forbidden. For this he received the greatest praise from Emperor Joseph II. However, the bishop met with great protest from a large part of the faithful.

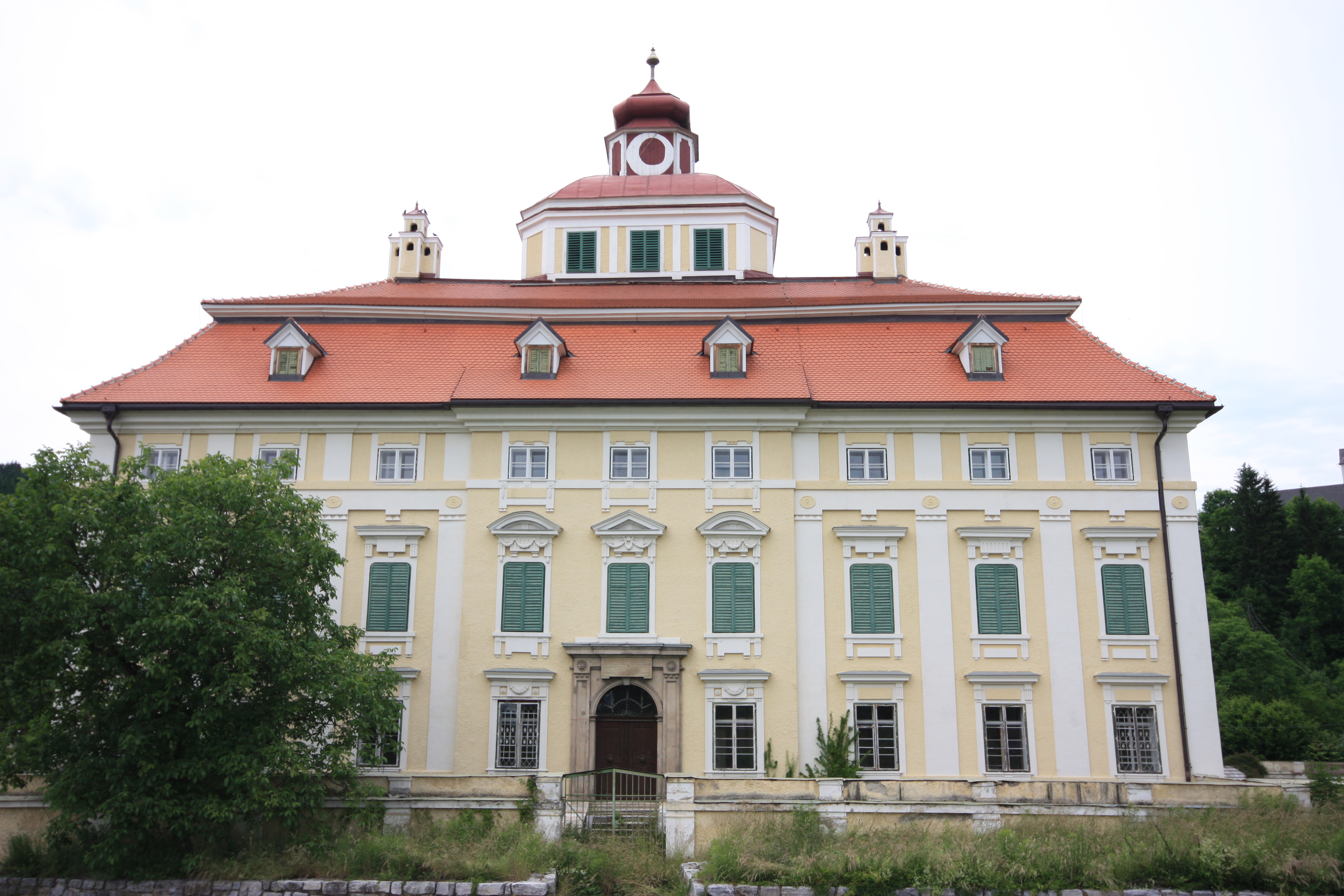
Schloss Poeckstein

Through numerous ecclesiastical reforms, he made his diocese a model of a state-church diocesan administration. Here he had Pöckstein Castle built by Johann Georg von Hagenauer. During the cooperation for a new diocesan regulation of Inner Austria, Auersperg's proposal to elevate the diocese of Gurk to an archdiocese was not accepted. On the occasion of the first papal visit to Austria by Pope Pius VI, Auersperg traveled to Ljubljana to greet the guest there on 16 March 1782, on the pope's way to Vienna.

The Passau cathedral chapter elected Auersperg as bishop on 19 May 1783, after Emperor Joseph II had separated the Austrian parts from the diocese of Passau immediately after the death of Cardinal Leopold Ernst von Firmian. The new prince-bishop was unable to change the Emperor's mind and renounced all diocesan rights in the Austrian territories.

Supported by his brother Count Johann von Auersperg, whom he made vicar general, he carried out drastic reforms in the following years. He fought against various forms of popular piety, had images of saints removed that were objected to during visitations, and forbade sermons against Protestants. He promoted the care of the poor and the sick and at the same time had begging banned under penalty of law. He excelled as a builder and patron of the arts in the diocese of Passau. Theater and opera, which he saw as educational institutions, flourished under him. On 30 March 1789, Pope Pius VI appointed him a cardinal.

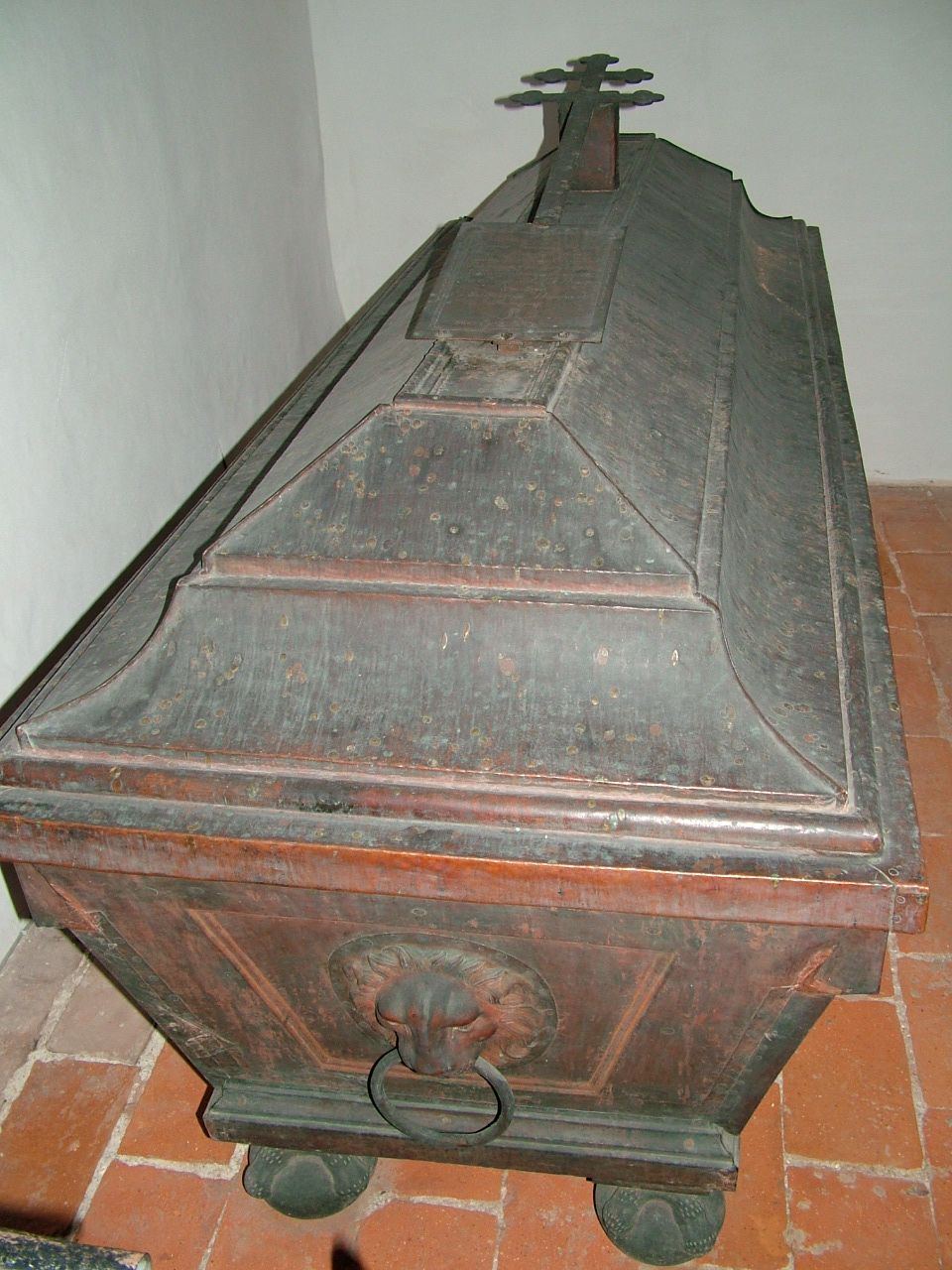
Auersperg's coffin in Passau

Under Auersperg, in addition to the court theater with the Redoutenhaus, schoolhouses, hospitals, administrative buildings, roads and bridges were built, in particular the Inn promenade in Passau. He had court architect and lifelong friend Johann Georg von Hagenauer build Schloss Freudenhain as a summer residence, which included an important park. He was awarded the grand cross of the Austrian Order of Sankt Stefan in 1791.

He died unexpectedly at the age of 61 in his villa in the Holländerdörferl, an artificial village in the middle of the park. He was buried in the crypt of Passau Cathedral.
