= Salzburg Global Seminar =

Organization

Salzburg Global
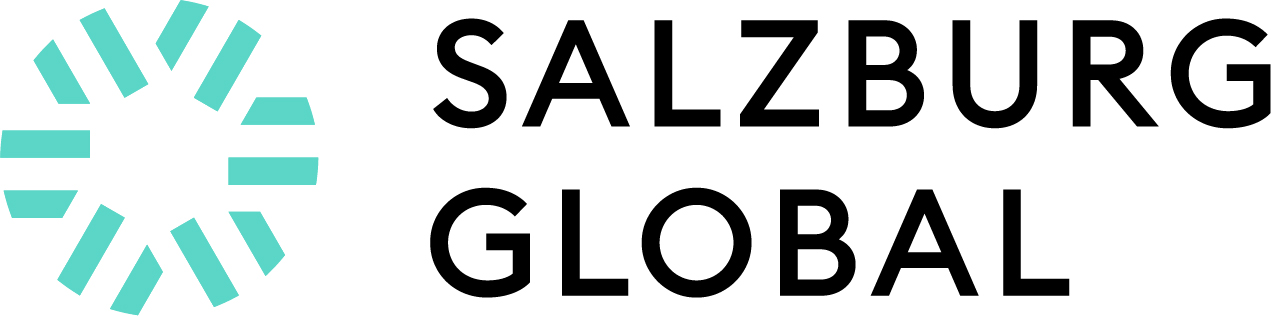
- Founded: 1947, Incorporated 1950
- Founder: Clemens Heller; Richard D. Campbell Jr.; Scott Elledge
- Type: Non-profit organization (IRS exemption status): 501(c)(3)
- Purpose: Peace and Justice, Education, Culture, Health, and Finance and Governance
- Location(s): Salzburg, Austria; Washington D.C., United States
- Region served: Global
- President and Chief Executive Officer: Martin Weiss
- Key people: Grant L. Cambridge; Chairman of the Board
- Website: www.salzburgglobal.org/
- Formerly called: The Harvard Student Council's Salzburg Seminar in American Civilization (1947); Salzburg Seminar in American Studies (1948–2007); Salzburg Global Seminar (2007–2024); Salzburg Global (2024–present)

Salzburg Global (formerly known as Salzburg Global Seminar) is a non-profit organization that convenes programs on its five pillar topics of Peace and Justice, Education, Culture, Health, and Finance and Governance. Programs regularly occur at Schloss Leopoldskron in Salzburg, Austria. A global leaders' forum since 1947, Salzburg Global has welcomed more than 40,000 participants, known as Salzburg Global Fellows, from more than 170 countries.

== Organizational history ==
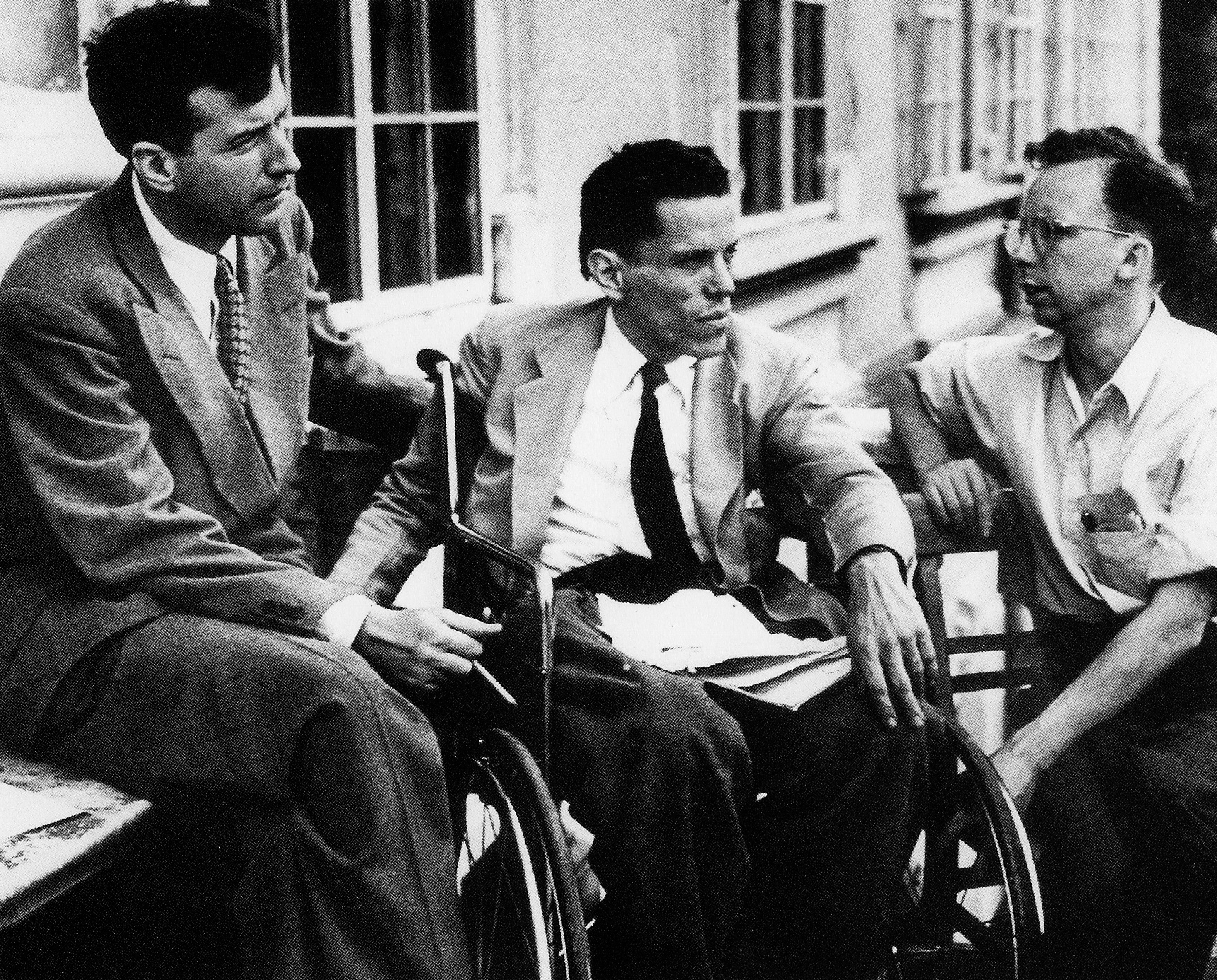
Founders of Salzburg Global Seminar - Heller, Campbell, Elledge in 1947

In 1946, Clemens Heller, a native Austrian attending graduate school at Harvard University, "envisioned a cultural bridge spanning the Atlantic not only by introducing the demoralized Europeans to all sorts of American cultural achievements, but also by stimulating a fruitful exchange between European national cultures and America."

Richard "Dick" Campbell Jr., an undergraduate student and Scott Elledge, an English instructor also at Harvard, became allies in the realization of this project. Though Harvard was unwilling to support the project, they were able to convince the Harvard Student Council to be the official sponsors of the Seminar. The three founders raised the majority of funds. It was also necessary for the trio to obtain permission from the State Department for entrance into Allied Occupied Austria.

Legend contends that in 1947, Heller bumped into Helene Thimig on a subway train in New York. The widow of theater producer Max Reinhardt had been friends with Heller's parents before the war and had a summer home in Salzburg named Schloss Leopoldskron.

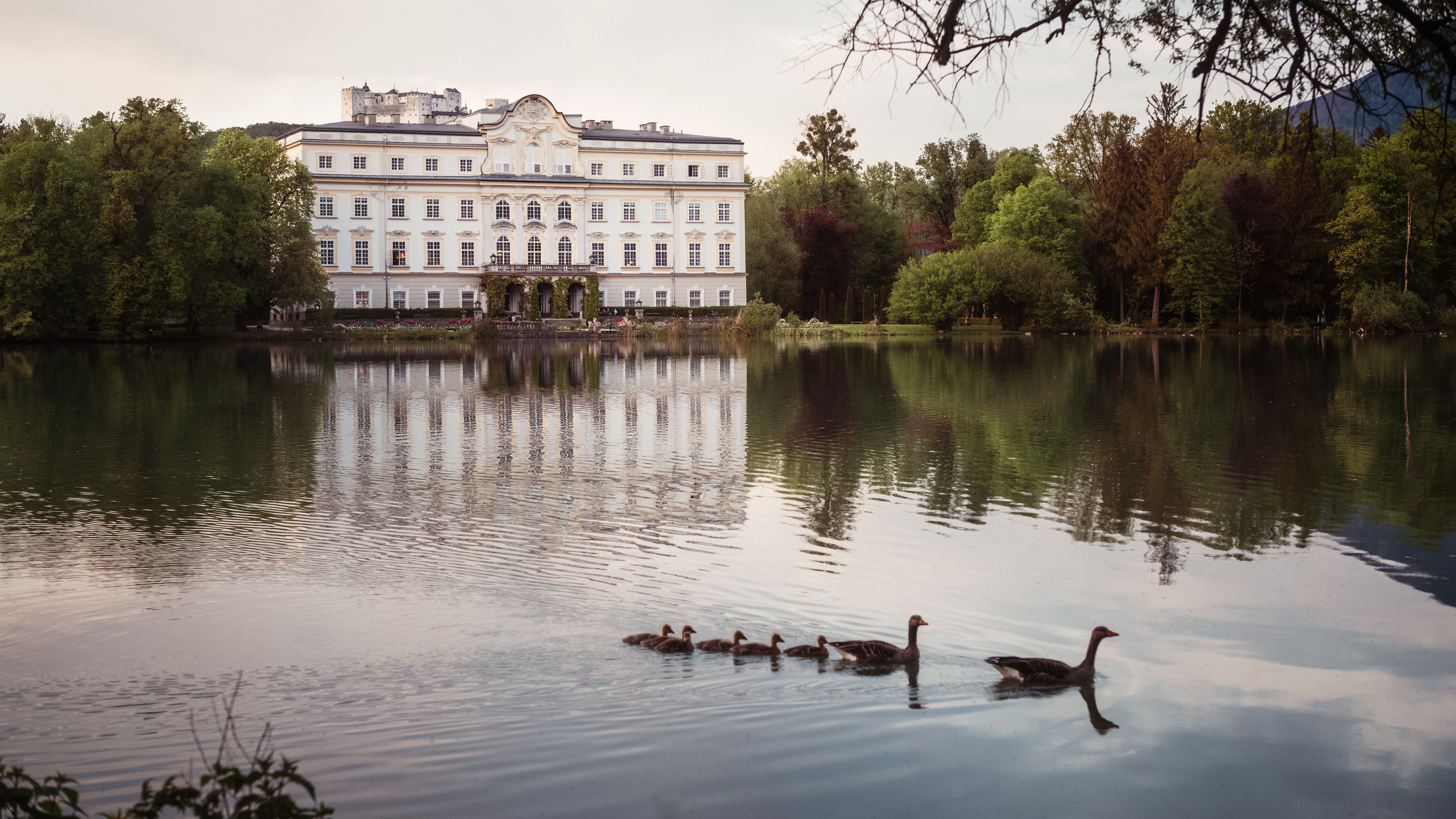
Schloss Leopoldskron

Heller explained his plans and Thimig said she would rent Max’s Schloss at a low rate for the purpose of a summer school. Dick Campbell is quoted as saying "We hope to create at least one small center in which young Europeans from all countries, and of all political convictions, could meet for a month in concrete work under favorable living conditions, and to lay the foundation for a possible permanent center of intellectual discussion in Europe."

The first session, officially called "The Harvard Student Council's Salzburg Seminar in American Civilization," lasted six weeks in the summer of 1947 and brought together men and women from eighteen countries, including countries from behind the Iron Curtain. Faculty for the first session included literary historian F. O. Matthiessen; anthropologist Margaret Mead; economists Walt Rostow and Wassily Leontief; writer and literary critic Alfred Kazin among others.

The Seminar was formally incorporated on April 20, 1950. Dexter Perkins, Frederick Muhlhauser, Herbert P. Gleason, Clyde and Florence Kluckhohn, Wassily Leontief and Richard Campbell all signed the papers of the Salzburg Seminar in American Studies. By 1950, the Seminar developed into more than a summer school and session topics were expanded beyond American Studies.

During President Tuthill’s second year, he told the Board that in 1979 "American Law would be the only ‘American’ subject offered." The Seminar had become so global in focus, that he twice urged that the Seminar be renamed "Salzburg Seminar in International Studies." In 2007, the Seminar changed its name to the Salzburg Global Seminar in order to better reflect the increasingly global, rather than American, outlook of the Seminar and the focus of its course offerings.

Although the Seminar grew to include a more global focus, American Studies themes continued to be present at Salzburg Global Seminar. In 1994, the Seminar returned to its roots by establishing the American Studies Center. From 1994 to 2002 thirty-two sessions on American themes were held. In 2003 the Salzburg Seminar American Studies Association (SSASA) was created. SSASA organizes a yearly symposium devoted to a broad American Studies theme such as politics, literature, history or cultural studies.

Today, Salzburg Global holds sessions that focus "on critical issues confronting the global community, covering topics as diverse as health care and education, culture and economics, geopolitics and philanthropy... Seminars are designed to be participatory: prompting candid dialogue, fresh thinking and constantly in the search for innovative but practical solutions."

== Home of the Salzburg Global Seminar ==
Prince-Archbishop of Salzburg Count Leopold Anton Eleutherius von Firmian (1679-1744) commissioned Schloss Leopoldskron in 1736. The chapel of Leopoldskron was consecrated in 1744. Archbishop von Firmian handed the Fideikommiss charter to his nephew, Lakantz, Count of Firmian. The Archbishop died in October 1744, and was buried in the Salzburg's cathedral while his heart was interred in Leopoldskron's chapel. The Schloss remained in the possession of the Firmian family until 1837. It was then sold to the owner of a local shooting gallery, George Zierer, who stripped the palace of most of its valuable interior decorations, including paintings, etchings, and sculptures.

The Schloss had several owners during the 19th century (including two waiters who wanted to use it as a hotel, ex-King Ludwig I of Bavaria and a banker) until it was bought in 1918 by the famous theatre director Max Reinhardt, co-founder of the Salzburg Festival. During World War II the Schloss was confiscated as Jewish property. After the war, and Max Reinhardt's death, the Schloss was returned to the Reinhardt Estate. After two quick sales, first to a bank and then the City of Salzburg, Schloss Leopoldskron was sold to the "Salzburg Seminar in American Studies" in 1959. The purchase price of the Schloss and 17 acres was "$77,000, plus $10,500 in solicitors' fees." In 1973 the adjacent Meierhof, a part of the original Firmian estate, was also purchased by the Seminar.

In 2014, the Meierhof underwent a substantial two-month renovation which incorporated the 18th century style of the Schloss. For instance, the headboards were crafted from historic shutters. In addition, three rooms were created to reference the 1965 movie "The Sound of Music" which was filmed, in part, on the Schloss grounds. In addition to being the home of Salzburg Global Seminar, the Schloss Leopoldskron and the Meierhof now operate as a fully functioning hotel.

== Leadership of Salzburg Global Seminar ==
- Martin Weiss, 2022-present
- Stephen Salyer, 2005–2022
- Amy Hastings, (acting) 2005
- Olin Clyde Robison, 1991–2005
- Bradford Morse, 1986–1991
- Herbert P. Gleason, (acting) 1985-1986
- John W. Tuthill, 1977–1985
- Thomas H. Eliot, 1971–1976
- Paul M. Herzog, 1965–1971
- Arthur S. Adams, 1962–1965
- Dexter Perkins, 1950–1961

== Mission ==
The mission of Salzburg Global Seminar is to challenge current and future leaders to shape a better world. The Salzburg Global Seminar convenes imaginative thinkers from different cultures and institutions, organizes problem-focused initiatives, supports leadership development, and engages opinion-makers through active communication networks, all in partnership with leading institutions from around the world and across different sectors of society.

== Areas of Impact ==
Salzburg Global's programs are organized under five thematic headings:

- Peace and Justice
- Education
- Culture
- Health
- Finance and Governance

== Programs ==
- Salzburg Global American Studies Program
- The Salzburg Academy on Media and Global Change
- Salzburg Global Forum for Young Cultural Innovation
- Culture, Arts and Society
- Education for Tomorrow’s World
- Health and Healthcare Innovation
- Global Innovations on Youth Violence, Safety and Justice
- Parks for the Planet Forum
- Japan-India Transformative Technology Network
- Asia Peace Innovators Forum
- Salzburg Global Finance Forum
- Salzburg Global Corporate Governance Forum
- Salzburg Global Law and Technology Forum

=== Salzburg Cutler Fellowship Program ===
In 2012, Salzburg Global Seminar launched the Salzburg Cutler Law Fellows Program, named in memory of Lloyd N. Cutler, former White House Counsel for two presidents and Chairman of the Board of Salzburg Global Seminar. The program is a partnership with ten leading U.S. law schools in order to identify and mentor young leaders in international law and legal practice.

== Notable Salzburg Global Fellows ==
Alumni of Sessions of Salzburg Global Seminar are referred to as Salzburg Global Fellows. The Salzburg Global Fellowship consists of more than 30,000 individuals from 169 countries around the world who have participated in Salzburg Global Seminar programs since 1947.”

- Kofi Annan
- Kwame Anthony Appiah
- Saul Bellow
- Ryan Broderick
- Warren E. Burger
- Hillary Clinton
- Ralph Ellison
- Benedicte Gendron
- Valery Gergiev
- Ruth Bader Ginsburg
- Richard Goldstone
- Alexandros Kapelis
- Jim Yong Kim
- Pascal Lamy
- Neil MacGregor
- Makaziwe Mandela
- Margaret Mead
- Sandra Day O'Connor
- Lubna Olayan
- Lemi Ponifasio
- Mamphela Ramphele
- Buffy Sainte-Marie
- Sam-Ang Sam
- Ong Keng Sen
- Vikram Seth
- Achim Steiner
- Arthur Miller
- Jean-Claude Trichet
- John Tusa
- Anmol Vellani
- James D. Watson
- Terje Rød-Larsen
- Tamara Adrián
- Vaira Vīķe-Freiberga
- Kevin Rudd
- Heinz Fischer
- James Bacchus
- Anthony Kennedy
- Gennady Burbulis
- Nat Wei
- Stephen Breyer
- Kim Campbell
- Giuliano Amato
- Mamphela Ramphele
- Paolo Petrocelli
