= Karl Joseph von Firmian =

Austrian noble (1716–1782)

His Lordship Karl Joseph von Firmian
- Franz Laktanz Firmian, Portrait of Karl Joseph von Firmian, c. 1765, priv. col.
- Born: Karl Gotthard von Firmian; 15 August 1716; Trento, Trent
- Died: 20 July 1782 (aged 65); Milan, Duchy of Milan
- Burial place: San Bartolomeo, Milan
- Education: Leiden University
- Family: Von Firmian
- Honours: Order of the Golden Fleece

Austrian Ambassador to Naples
- In office 1754–1758
- Monarch: Maria Theresa
- Preceded by: Alfons Gomez da Sylva
- Succeeded by: Leopold Carl Neipperg

Governor of the Duchy of Milan
- In office 1771–1782
- Monarchs: Maria Theresa; Joseph II, Holy Roman Emperor
- Preceded by: Ferdinand Karl, Archduke of Austria-Este
- Succeeded by: Johann Joseph Wilczek

Karl Joseph von Firmian (15 August 1716 – 20 July 1782) was an Austrian noble, who served as Plenipotentiary of Lombardy to the Habsburg Monarchy. His proper name was Karl Gotthard von Firmian, and in Italy known as Carlo Giuseppe di Firmian.

== Biography ==
=== Early life and education ===
Karl Joseph von Firmian was born in Trento on 15 August 1716. He belonged to an ancient noble family, and was the nephew of Leopold Anton von Firmian, Prince-Archbishop of Salzburg from 1727 until his death. He was raised and educated in the Abbey School of Ettal in Bavaria, then in Innsbruck and Salzburg. He attended Leiden University and well traveled through France and Italy. While in Paris, he became acquainted with the circle of philosophes and developed an inclination towards enlightened absolutism, which would come to characterise his politics. Upon returning to Austria, he settled in Salzburg, where he met the historian Giambattista de Gaspari, who introduced him to the reform-oriented Catholic Enlightenment of Ludovico Antonio Muratori.

=== Ambassador to Naples (1754–1758) ===
Following his appointment to the Aulic Council in 1746, Empress Maria Theresa appointed Firmian ambassador to the Neapolitan court in November 1753. After securing the election of Trier's coadjutor in Rome as desired by the court, he arrived in Naples on 12 March 1754 and remained there until 26 September 1758. During this time, he worked towards the 'renversement des alliances', promoting a new, closer alliance with the Bourbon court. Firmian negotiated with Tanucci regarding the succession in Naples and Parma, and prepared the 1759 treaty, which was concluded under his successor, Count Leopold Carl Neipperg. This treaty transferred some of the territories on the Tuscan coast belonging to the Crown of Naples to Maria Theresa and, through her, to Tuscany.

Although he was only accredited as ambassador to Naples, Firmian was repeatedly entrusted with special, mostly secret, missions to Rome and Florence during his tenure.

=== Governor of the Duchy of Milan (1756–1782) ===
At the death of Grand Chancellor Count Beltrame Cristiani on 3 July 1756, Firmian was summoned to Milan, where he was named plenipotentiary minister to Lombardy, a position he held for the rest of his life.

During this period, Austrian Lombardy became a vital testing ground for the pioneering reforms of Josephinism. Firmian collaborated closely with Austrian Chancellor Kaunitz to implement a comprehensive reform programme covering finance, tax and customs legislation, and the promotion of manufacturing and trade. This was complemented by drastic reforms to the judicial system and higher education. Firmian was also responsible for the dissolution of contemplative monasteries and the reorganization of parishes by the state.

While Firmian executed the initial waves of Joseph II's direct mandates, his administrative style was traditionally more measured and focused on diplomatic compromise with local intellectuals (like Pietro Verri and Cesare Beccaria). This sometimes frustrated the fiercely impatient Emperor Joseph II, who viewed Firmian as too slow.

Firmian is remembered as an avid promoter of the arts and sciences, patronizing both the artists Johann Joachim Winckelmann and Angelica Kauffman. He associated with enlightened scholars such as Cesare Beccaria and Giuseppe Parini, supporting and encouraging them. He founded the Faculty of Science and Arts at the University of Pavia, endowing it with a library, a botanical garden and laboratories for chemistry, physics, natural history and anatomy. He brought new renown to the University by appointing outstanding scholars such as the astronomer Roger Joseph Boscovich. In 1773, he elevated the Scuole Palatine to an academy and opened the Accademia di Belle Arti, as well as Milan's first large public library, in the former Jesuit college of Brera.

Firmian was one of the first patrons of the young Austrian composer, Wolfgang Amadeus Mozart, inviting him and his father, Leopold, to Milan in January 1770. Mozart's operas Mitridate, re di Ponto, Ascanio in Alba and Lucio Silla were first performed in Milan between 1770 and 1772.

In recognition of his diplomatic achievements and successful administration of the Duchy of Milan, Firmian was appointed a Knight of the Order of the Golden Fleece in 1763. He died in Milan on 20 July 1782. Upon his death, he had amassed a significant collection of paintings and an extensive library. His forty thousand books were dispersed among the collections of the Brera, Ambrosiana and Trivulziana libraries. His collection of twenty thousand engravings was purchased by the Bourbons of Naples and is now housed in the Museo di Capodimonte.

Firmian died in Milan on 15 August 1716, and was buried in the church of San Bartolomeo. During the Napoleonic occupation of Lombardy, his monument was removed as part of an effort to expunge any signs of prior Austrian governance. After 1815, it was returned to its place. Firmian's Palazzo at Porta Nuova, which had been frescoed by his favourite painter and fellow countryman, Martin Knoller, and where Firmian had lived for almost twenty-five years, was destroyed during World War II.

== Works ==
- Troppo importando al bene della pubblica educazione (in Italian). Milano: Giuseppe Richino Malatesta. 1780.

== Bibliography ==
- Anton Victor Felgel (1877). "Firmian, Karl Gotthard Graf und Herr zu" . Allgemeine Deutsche Biographie (in German). Vol. 7. Leipzig: Duncker & Humblot. pp. 27–29.
- Heinrich Benedikt (1961). "Firmian, Carl Joseph Gotthard". Neue Deutsche Biographie (in German). Vol. 5. Berlin: Duncker & Humblot. p. 169. (full text online).
- Garms-Cornides, Elisabeth (1985). "Überlegungen zu einer Karriere im Dienst Maria Theresias: Karl Graf Firmian". Österreich im Europa der Aufklärung. Kontinuität und Zäsur in Europa zur Zeit Maria Theresias und Josephs II (in German). Vol. I. Vienna: Austrian Academy of Sciences. pp. 547–556. ISBN 978-3700107125.
- Garms-Cornides, Elisabeth (1997). "FIRMIAN, Carlo Gottardo, conte di". Dizionario Biografico degli Italiani (in Italian). Vol. 48: Filoni–Forghieri. Rome: Istituto dell'Enciclopedia Italiana. ISBN 978-88-12-00032-6.
- Mauro Nequirito, ed. (2002). Trentini nell'Europa dei lumi: Firmian, Martini, Pilati, Barbacovi (in Italian). Trento: Comune di Trento.
- Israel, Jonathan (2013). Democratic Enlightenment. Philosophy, Revolution, and Human Rights 1750-1790. Oxford: Oxford University Press. pp. 357–359. ISBN 978-0199668090.
- Stefano Ferrari, ed. (2023). Il conte Carlo Firmian (1718-1782): nuovi itinerari di ricerca (in Italian). Trento: Società di Studi Trentini di Scienze Storiche. ISBN 978-88-8133-053-9.
