= Thomas Johann Kaspar von Thun und Hohenstein =

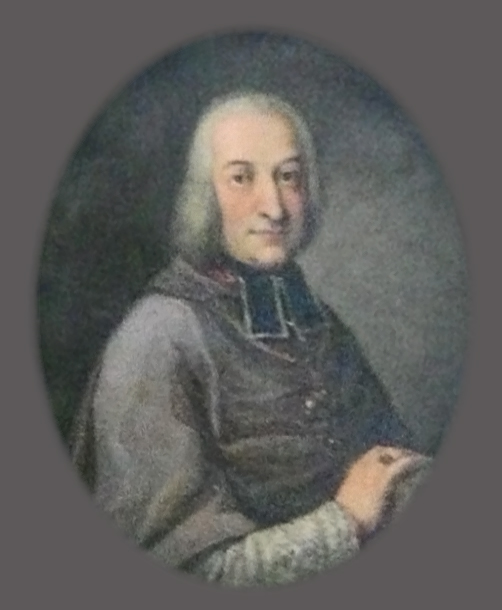
Passau Dom Grabdenkmal Thomas Johann von Thun und Hohenstein

Thomas Johann Nepomuk Kaspar, Count of Thun and Hohenstein (16 May 1737 – 7 October 1796) was the 72nd Bishop of Passau.

== Biography ==
Born in Trento, he was the son of a prince-bishop's court marshal and imperial secret councilor and chamberlain from the noble family of Thun und Hohenstein. He became the canon of Passau in 1756 after completing his studies. In 1766 he was appointed Chairman of the Court Council and in 1771 the Domdekan. It was not until this year that he received the priestly ordination.

In 1776 he was appointed titular bishop of Thyatira, where he served as an auxiliary bishop in Passau under Prince Bishop Leopold Ernst von Firmian. On 19 January 1777 Firmian also gave him the bishop's consecration. He was the most important official under the prince-bishop in the administration of the extended diocese, and lastly led the political business.

After his death, he was defeated by Joseph Franz Anton von Auersperg in the bishop's election in 1783, and since then he has been the leader of the conservative camp in the cathedral chapter. After Auersperg's death, he was elected as a new bishop of Passau by the cathedral chapter on 4 November 1795. In his brief period of government, he promoted the expansion of the Hacklberg brewery and the woodcut on the Ilz as well as the Passau porcelain manufactory. After only 11 months and 4 days of government, he died from the consequences of a fall from the horse he had suffered on a hike to Hacklberg.
