= San Bartolomeo, Milan =

Church building in Milan, Italy

Coordinates: 45°28′34″N 9°11′44″E

Church of Saint Bartholomew (Chiesa di San Bartolomeo)
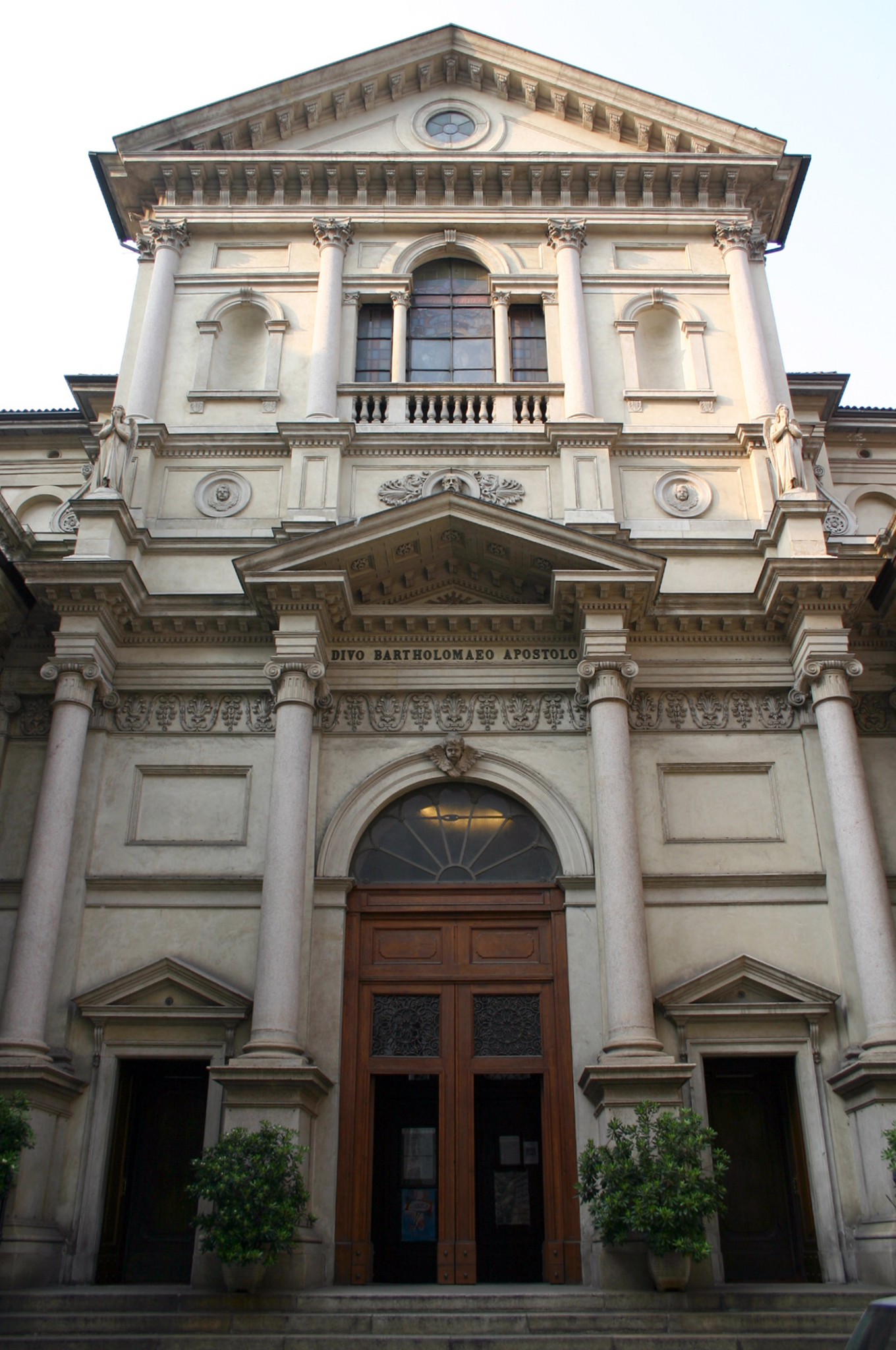
- Façade of the church.

Religion
- Affiliation: Roman Catholic
- Province: Milan
- Status: Active

Location
- Location: Milan, Italy
- Interactive map of Church of Saint Bartholomew (Chiesa di San Bartolomeo)

Architecture
- Architect: Maurizio Garavaglia
- Type: Church
- Style: Neoclassical
- Groundbreaking: 1864
- Completed: 1864

San Bartolomeo is a 19th-century, Roman Catholic church in Milan, region of Lombardy, Italy.

== History ==
The architect Maurizio Garavaglia designed the present structure in 1864, replacing a church from 1500s of the same name located a nearby site. An engraving of the former church by Marc'Antonio Dal Re exists. The prior church had an icon depicting the Madonna del Buon Aiuto (Our Lady of Good Help), originally attributed to Lucas Cranach, donated by Countess Teresa Gordone Serbelloni when the Ottoman army was nearing the Siege of Vienna. That church accumulated a number of tombs of the aristocracy. The church was the site of disturbances during riots occurring in 1848. That older church was demolished during urban renewal, in the second half of the 19th century.

The church contains a neoclassic Monument to Karl Joseph von Firmian, who was plenipotentiary of Austrian Lombardy. The tomb sculpted by Giuseppe Franchi; it was restored after removal by French troops during the Napoleonic occupation.
