= Martin Weiss (diplomat) =

Austrian Ambassador to the United States

His Excellency Martin Weiss
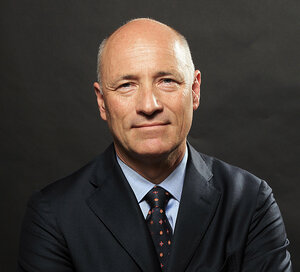

President of Salzburg Global Seminar
- Incumbent
- Assumed office 2022
- Preceded by: Stephen Salyer

Austrian Ambassador to the United States
- In office 1 November 2019 – July 2022
- President: Alexander Van der Bellen
- Chancellor: Brigitte Bierlein; Sebastian Kurz; Alexander Schallenberg; Karl Nehammer
- Preceded by: Wolfgang Waldner
- Succeeded by: Petra Schneebauer

Austrian Ambassador to Israel
- In office 1 November 2015 – 31 October 2019
- President: Alexander Van der Bellen; Heinz Fischer
- Chancellor: Brigitte Bierlein; Sebastian Kurz; Christian Kern; Werner Faymann
- Preceded by: Franz-Josef Kuglitsch
- Succeeded by: Hannah Liko

Austrian Ambassador to Cyprus
- In office 2009–2012
- President: Heinz Fischer
- Chancellor: Werner Faymann
- Succeeded by: Karl Müller

Personal details
- Born: 31 December 1962 (age 63) Innsbruck, Austria
- Education: University of Vienna (Mag. iur.); University of Virginia (LL.M.)

Martin Weiss (born 31 December 1962 in Innsbruck, Austria) is an Austrian career diplomat who served as Ambassador of Austria to the United States from 2019 to 2022. He is currently the president and chief executive officer of Salzburg Global Seminar, an independent nongovernmental organization based in Salzburg, Austria and Washington, D.C. He previously served as Austrian Ambassador to Israel and Cyprus.

== Life and career ==
Martin Weiss grew up in Salzburg, Austria, and studied law at the Faculty of Law of the University of Vienna. After graduating in 1986, he worked as teaching assistant for constitutional law at his alma mater until 1988. He then spent one year at the University of Virginia School of Law on a Fulbright stipend, acquiring a Master of Laws (LL.M.) degree in 1989.

He joined the Austrian Foreign Service in 1990 and had his first posting at the Austrian Mission to the United Nations in New York, where he served as Human Rights Attaché. After returning to the Foreign Ministry in Vienna and a leave of absence to support the presidential campaign of Thomas Klestil, Martin Weiss was posted to the Austrian Embassy in Washington, D.C., where he held the positions of Political Counselor, Counselor for Congressional Affairs and Public Diplomacy, and later Director of the Austrian Press and Information Service. He returned to Vienna in 2001 to take up the position of Director of the Press and Information Department at the Austrian Ministry of Foreign Affairs.

From 2004 to 2009 he served as Austrian consul general in Los Angeles, followed by his first ambassadorial posting as head of mission to Cyprus (2009-2012). After returning once again to the Foreign Ministry in Vienna to lead the Press and Information Department from 2012 to 2015, Martin Weiss was appointed Austrian Ambassador to Israel in 2015, a position he held until 2019.

On 1 November 2019, Martin Weiss took up his duties as Austrian Ambassador to the United States. He presented his credentials to the President of the United States on 6 January 2020.

He became the ninth President and CEO of the Salzburg Global Seminar on 1 August 2022.

== Personal life ==
Martin Weiss is married and father of two adult children.
