= Marcantonio Dal Re =

Italian engraver and publisher (1697–1766)

- Santa Maria delle Grazie. Engraving from Dal Re's Vedute di Milano
- Born: 18 December 1697; Bologna, Papal States
- Died: 26 April 1766 (aged 68); Milan, Duchy of Milan
- Known for: Engraving

Marcantonio Dal Re (18 December 1697 – 26 April 1766), also spelled Marc'Antonio Dal Re, was an Italian draftsman, engraver and publisher. He is best known for his engravings of buildings and vedute of Milan and Lombardy.

== Biography ==
Marcantonio Dal Re was born in Bologna on 18 December 1697 to Ludovico Dal Re and Antonia De Mariani. He trained as a copperplate engraver and intaglio printmaker. After leaving Bologna, he is lived for a time in Cremona in 1719, where he ran a workshop in the Contrada del Borghetto, near the Camaldolese church of Santa Caterina. Around 1723 or 1724, Dal Re moved to Milan, where he remained until his death. He set up his workshop in Contrada Santa Margherita, before moving to the Loggia degli Osii in Piazza Mercanti in 1739. In 1744, he established a school of engraving and drawing.

Dal Re was an extremely prolific and highly versatile artist. His body of work encompasses prints commenting on contemporary news and historical events, devotional subjects, portraits, maps, illustrated sonnets for theatrical performers, book vignettes, and city plans. His most notable works include an album of 88 Vedute di Milano (Views of Milan) and two collections of Ville di delizia (country villas). The Vedute di Milano depict churches, convents, public buildings, and, above all, patrician palaces. Although undated, the album is thought to date from around 1745. It is of great documentary importance in understanding the development of the city during Spanish domination.

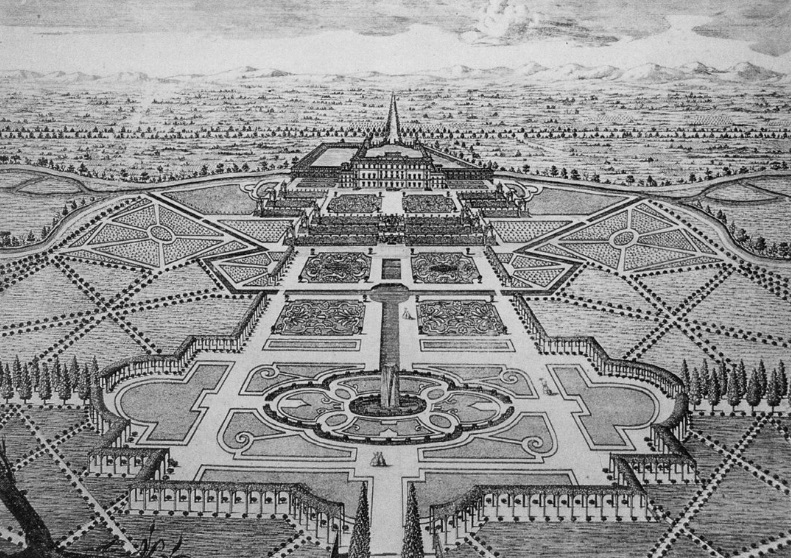
Villa Litta Carini. Engraving by Dal Re for the collection Ville di delizia

The two collections of views of Lombard villas that Dal Re engraved and published in two editions, in 1726 and 1743, are more ambitious in scope. The first bears the title: Ville di delizia o siano Palaggi camparecci nello Stato di Milano (Villas or Country Palaces in the State of Milan). Dedicated to Prince Eugene of Savoy, this volume was published in Milan in 1726, though some copies bear the date 1727. The title page features a plate depicting the Fall of Phaethon, engraved by Dal Re based on a design by the Bolognese painter Aureliano Milani. Although six volumes were originally planned, only one containing 53 plates was eventually published. A descriptive plate, or 'ragguaglio', providing an account of the villas and information about their builders precedes each set of prints pertaining to a specific villa.

In 1743, Dal Re published a new edition of Ville di delizia. This new edition contains 88 plates illustrating twelve villas, thirteen of which were not included in the first edition. The main difference between the two editions is that Dal Re is listed as the sole author of the 1743 version, acting as both draftsman and engraver. No further volumes were released, although an additional 55 plates depicting eight further villas were published separately.

In 1734, Dal Re published a planimetric map of Milan, depicting major buildings and churches alongside their respective ground plans. This was the first printed map to preserve the historical names of Milan's streets. The map underwent several print runs, with updates continuing even after 1770. Dal Re’s final works date from 1763: Corso del Redefossi da porta Tosa in avanti e sue diramazioni (published in Esame dell'ingegnere Dionigi Maria Ferrario, Milan, 1763) and Tipo dimostrante l'andamento del nuovo confine stabilito fra lo Stato di Milano e l'Ecc.ma Repubblica delle Tre Leghe. Dal Re died in Milan on 23 April 1766, aged 68. Many of his engravings are held in the Civica raccolta delle stampe Achille Bertarelli at the Sforza Castle in Milan.

== Gallery ==
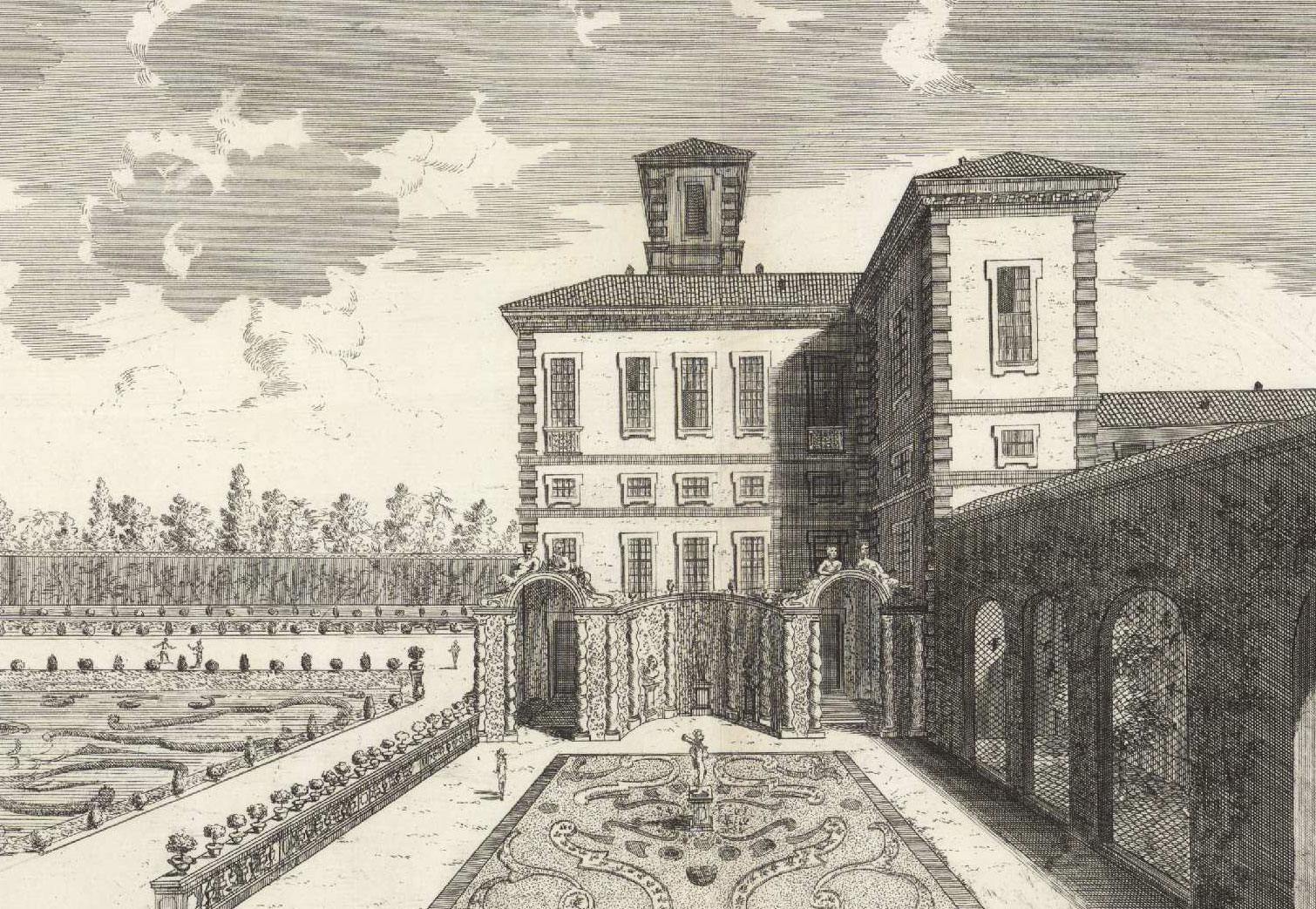
Veduta of Villa Silva in Cinisello, from Dal Re's Ville di delizia, 1726

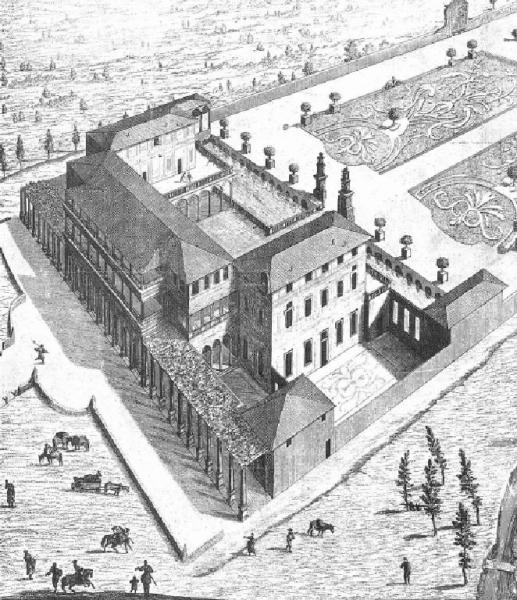
Veduta of Villa Simonetta, from Dal Re's Ville di delizia, 1726

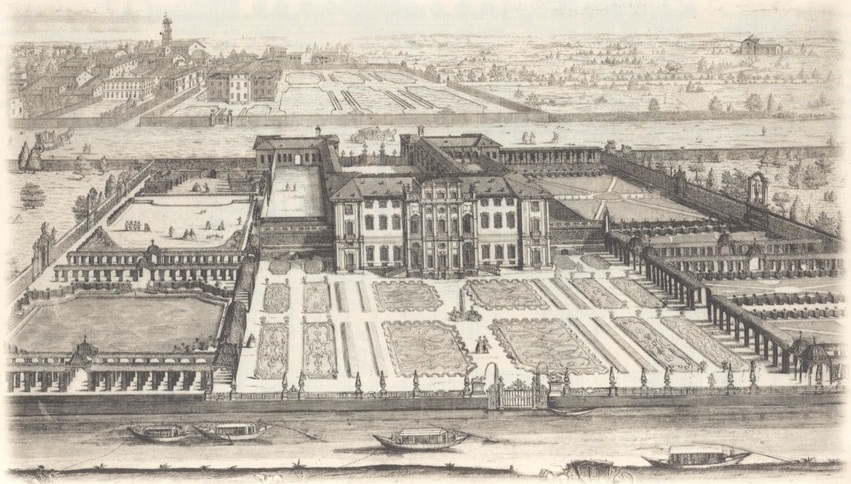
Veduta of Villa Alari a Cernusco sul Naviglio, from Dal Re's Ville di delizia, 1726

San Fedele, Milan, from Dal Re's Vedute di Milano, c. 1745

The old Church of San Bartolomeo, Milan, from Dal Re's Vedute di Milano, c. 1745

Veduta of Palazzo Visconti in Birignano, from Dal Re's Ville di delizia, 1726

Veduta of the Teatro Massimo in the Borromeo Palace in Isola Bella, from Dal Re's Ville di delizia, 1726

Veduta of the Sforza Castle, published by Dal Re in 1752

== Bibliography ==
- Alberici, Clelia (1986). "DAL RE, Marcantonio". Dizionario Biografico degli Italiani (in Italian). Vol. 32: Dall'Anconata–Da Ronco. Rome: Institute of the Italian Encyclopaedia. ISBN 978-88-12-00032-6.
- Harris, Dianne (2003). The Nature of Authority: Villa Culture, Landscape, and Representation in Eighteenth-Century Lombardy. University Park: Penn State University Press. ISBN 978-0271022161.
- "Re, Marc'antonio dal". Benezit Dictionary of Artists. Oxford: Oxford University Press. 2011. doi:10.1093/benz/9780199773787.article.B00150765.
