= Herbert P. Gleason =

American lawyer (1928–2013)

Herbert Parsons Gleason (October 22, 1928 – December 9, 2013) was an American attorney who served as Boston's chief legal counsel under Mayor Kevin White.

== Biography ==
Gleason was born to Hollis Tidd Gleason, an investment banker, and Emily Blanchard (Clapp) Gleason, a women’s rights activist. He was raised in Cohasset, Massachusetts and graduated from Western Reserve Academy and Harvard College. He also served in the United States Army (working counterintelligence in Salzburg) and was an editorial writer for The Patriot Ledger. In 1958 he married Nancy Cope Aub. That same year he graduated from Harvard Law School and was admitted to the bar. After a year clerking for Judge Arthur E. Whittemore, Gleason joined the firm of Hill and Barlow, where he eventually became partner.

In 1949, Gleason began working for the Salzburg Global Seminar. From 1950 to 2010 he was a member of the organization's board of directors.

In 1960, Gleason and Kevin White gained control of Boston's Ward 5 Democratic committee and Gleason served for many years as the committee's chairman. Gleason worked on White's campaigns for Massachusetts Secretary of the Commonwealth and Mayor of Boston and after White's victory in the 1967 Boston mayoral election, Gleason was named Boston's corporation counsel. He was the city's legal counsel during the desegregation busing crisis, formed the legal basis for White's tax reform proposals, and defended the city in a lawsuit over overcrowding in the Charles Street Jail. He left city hall in 1979 to become a visiting scholar at Harvard Law School and to further his work with the Salzburg Global Seminar.

From 1980 to 1981, Gleason was the legal counsel for the MBTA Advisory Board. In 1981 he was hired by Warner-Amex. In 1988, Gleason joined the firm of Smith, McNulty & Kearney.

Gleason served on the transition team for White's successor, Raymond Flynn and served on his health care task force. Flynn later appointed him to serve as chairman of Boston’s Board of Health and Hospitals. In 1990, Gleason was appointed to a five-year term on the Massachusetts Ethics Commission. In 1992, United States District Court Judge A. David Mazzone appointed him as special master to review conditions at the sex offender unit at Bridgewater State Hospital.

Gleason served as president of the United South End Settlements, director of the Neighborhood Health Plan, director of METCO, and as director and vice president of the Massachusetts Health Data Consortium.

Gleason died of complications of melanoma on December 9, 2013 in Beth Israel Deaconess Medical Center at the age of 85.

Legal offices
Preceded by James J. Sullivan Jr.	Boston Corporation Counsel; 1967–1979	Succeeded by Joseph Alviani
