= Josephinism =

Policies of Joseph II, Holy Roman Emperor (r. 1780–90)

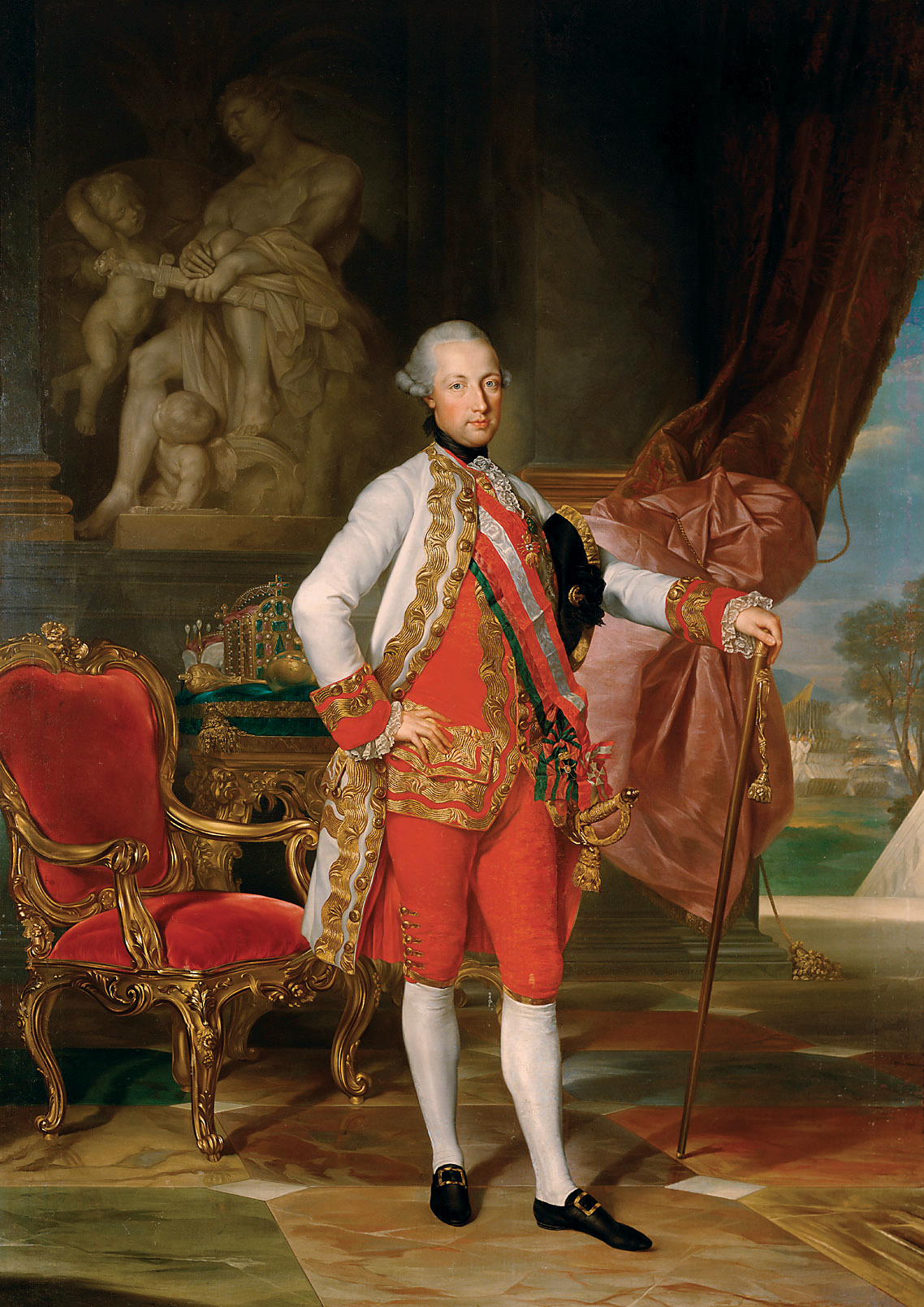
Joseph II by Anton von Maron, 1775

Josephinism (German: Josephinismus) is a name given collectively to the domestic policies of Joseph II, Holy Roman Emperor (1765–1790). During the ten years in which Joseph was the sole ruler of the Habsburg monarchy (1780–1790), he attempted to legislate a series of drastic reforms to remodel Austria in the form of what liberals saw as an ideal Enlightened state. This provoked severe resistance from powerful forces within and outside his empire, but ensured that he would be remembered as an "enlightened ruler" by historians from then to the present day.

== Origins ==
Born in 1741, Joseph was the son of Maria Theresa of Austria and Francis I, Holy Roman Emperor. He was given a rigorous education in the Age of Enlightenment, with its emphasis on rationality, order, and careful organization in statecraft. Viewing the often confused and complex morass of Habsburg administration in the crownlands of Austria, Bohemia, and Hungary, Joseph was deeply dissatisfied. He inherited the crown of the Holy Roman Empire in 1765, on the death of his father, but ruled the Habsburg lands only as the junior co-regent to his mother, the matriarch Maria Theresa, until 1780. During the co-regency the deeply pious Maria Theresa acquiesced to numerous reforms, especially when pushed by Joseph and her trusted chancellor Kaunitz. These included the suppression of 71 of the 467 monasteries in Lombardy, then an Austrian possession, an increase of the minimum age for monks to 24, a prohibition of further gifts of land to the Church unless permitted by the government, the effective dissolution of the Jesuit order by seizing their properties and removing their long held dominance in education, and an Urbarium law limiting some of the feudal obligations of peasants to their lords in Bohemia. These measures, although influenced by Joseph, were largely directed by Maria Theresa and Kaunitz, demonstrating that Josephinism as a political force predated its eponymous creator, albeit in a less radical form.

It was on the death of his mother in 1780 that Joseph II had the opportunity, free of any dominating hand, to pursue his own agenda. He intended a complete remodelling of Habsburg society in several different arenas. Issuing decrees and Patents, Joseph's reforms were a conscious attempt to reorder the rule of his lands using Enlightenment principles. At the heart of this "Josephinism" lay the idea of the unitary state, with a centralized, efficient government, rational and mostly secular society, with greater degrees of equality and freedom, and fewer arbitrary feudal institutions.

== Serfs, lords, and forced serf labour ==
For many centuries, the majority of the population of Central Europe had lived as serfs, labouring under feudal obligations to the landed nobility. On November 1, 1781, Joseph issued two Patents pertaining to Bohemia, which changed the serf–lord relationship there by abolishing the use of fines and corporal punishment imposed upon serfs, and abolishing lords' control over serfs' marriage, freedom of movement, and choice of occupation. The patents also allowed peasants to purchase hereditary ownership of the land that they worked. The nobility were hesitant to support Joseph's edicts, however, and they were inconsistently applied.

Throughout his reign, Joseph's ultimate goal was one shared originally with his mother regarding policy toward the serfs. Robin Okey, in The Habsburg Monarchy, describes it as the replacement of the forced serf labor system by the division of landed estates (including the demesne) among rent-paying tenants". In 1783, Joseph's advisor Franz Anton von Raab was instructed to extend this system to all lands owned directly by the Habsburg crown in Bohemia and Moravia.

== Censorship and the press ==
In February 1781, Joseph issued an edict drastically reducing the power of state censorship over the press. Censorship was limited only to expression that (a) blasphemed against the church, (b) subverted the government, or (c) promoted immorality. Censorship was also taken out of the hands of local authorities and centralized under the Habsburg imperial government.

Joseph was remarkably tolerant of dissenting speech—his censors banned only about 900 tracts published each year (down from 4,000 a year banned before his reign). One tract that even criticized him specifically, titled "The 42-Year-Old Ape", was not banned.

== Edicts of Tolerance ==
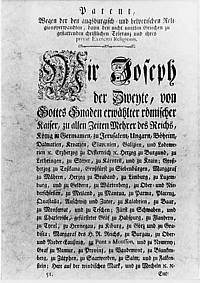
The Edict of Tolerance of 1781

While himself a Catholic—and certainly no advocate of unlimited religious freedom—Joseph was willing to tolerate a level of religious diversity in his domain that had been unthinkable not long before.

In May and October 1781, Joseph issued Edicts which removed restrictions against the practice of Protestant and Orthodox Christian religion. In communities with large Protestant or Orthodox minorities, churches were allowed to be built, and social restrictions on vocations, economic activity, and education were removed.

In 1782, Joseph dismantled many of the legal barriers against Jews performing certain professions, and lifted Jewish dress laws, Jewish-only taxes, and some restrictions on the movement of Jews. Nevertheless, he remained of the belief that Jews possessed "repellent characteristics". His decrees regarding that community did not include Galicia, the Habsburg province with the largest Jewish minority.

== Catholic Church in Habsburg lands ==
Regarding the Catholic Church, Joseph was virulently opposed to what he called "contemplative" religious institutions—reclusive institutions that he saw as doing nothing positive for society.

By Joseph's decree, Austrian bishops could not communicate directly with the Curia anymore. More than 500 of 1,188 monasteries in Austro-Slav lands (and a hundred more in Hungary) were dissolved, and 60 million florins taken by the state. This wealth was used to create 1,700 new parishes and welfare institutions.

The education of priests was taken from the Church as well. Joseph established six state-run "General Seminaries". In 1783, a Marriage Patent treated marriage as a civil contract rather than a religious institution.

When the Pope visited Austria in 1782, Joseph refused to rescind the majority of his decisions.

In 1783, the cathedral chapter of Passau opposed the nomination of a Josephinist bishop and sent, first, an appeal to the emperor himself, which naturally was rejected, then an appeal to the Imperial Diet at Regensburg, from which body, however, help could scarcely be expected. Assistance offered by Prussia was refused by Cardinal Firmian's successor, Bishop Joseph Franz Auersperg, an adherent of Josephinism. The bishop of Passau and the majority of his cathedral chapter finally yielded in order to save the secular property of the diocese.

By an agreement of 4 July 1784, the confiscation of all the properties and rights belonging to the Diocese of Passau in Austria was annulled, and the tithes and revenues were restored to it. In return Passau gave up its diocesan rights and authority in Austria, including the provostship of Ardagger, and bound itself to pay 400,000 florins ($900,000), afterwards reduced by the emperor to one-half toward the equipment of the new diocese.

There was nothing left for Pope Pius VI to do but to give his consent, even though unwillingly, to the emperor's authoritarian act. The papal sanction of the agreement between Vienna and Passau was issued on 8 November 1784, and on 28 January 1785, appeared the Bull of Erection, "Romanus Pontifex".

As early as 1785 the Viennese ecclesiastical order of services was made obligatory, "in accordance with which all musical litanies, novenas, octaves, the ancient touching devotions, also processions, vespers, and similar ceremonies, were done away with." Numerous churches and chapels were closed and put to secular uses; the greater part of the old religious foundations and monasteries were suppressed as early as 1784.

Nevertheless there could be no durable peace with the bureaucratic civil authorities, and Bishop Ernest Johann Nepomuk von Herberstein was repeatedly obliged to complain to the emperor of the tutelage in which the Church was kept, but the complaints bore little fruit.

Catholic historians said there was an alliance between Joseph and anti-clerical Freemasons. (Note: "In Germany and Austria, Freemasonry during the eighteenth century was a powerful ally of the so-called 'party of Enlightenment' (Aufklaerung), and of Josephinism" (Gruber 1909).)

== Hungarian Crown lands and the Netherlands ==
The pace of reform in Joseph's empire was uneven, especially in the crownlands of Hungary. Joseph was reluctant to include Hungary in most of his reforms early in his reign.

In 1784, Joseph brought the Hungarian Crown of St. Stephen from Pressburg, capital of Royal Hungary, to Vienna. Similarly, he brought the Bohemian Crown of Saint Wenceslas to Vienna. These were symbolic acts, meant to emphasize a new unity between the Habsburg crownlands, wherein they were to be seen as a singular entity. German replaced Latin as the official language of administration in Hungary. In 1785, Joseph extended his abolition of serfdom to Hungary, and a census of the Crown land was ordered, to prepare it for an Austrian-style military draft.

In 1787, the "administrative streamlining" that had been applied to the rest of the Empire was nominally applied to Austrian possessions in the Netherlands, but this was fiercely opposed by Belgian nobles, and would be a major contribution to the Brabant Revolution.

== Domestic resistance ==
Josephinism made many enemies inside the empire—from disaffected ecclesiastical authorities to noblemen. By the later years of his reign, disaffection with his sometimes radical policies was at a high, especially in the Austrian Netherlands and Hungary. Popular revolts and protests—led by nobles, seminary students, writers, and agents of Prussian King Frederick William—stirred throughout the Empire, prompting Joseph to tighten censorship of the press.

Before his death in 1790, Joseph was forced to rescind many of his administrative reforms. He returned the crown of St. Stephen to Buda in Hungary and promised to abide by the Hungarian constitution. Before he could actually be officially crowned "King of Hungary", he died at the age of 49.

Joseph's brother and successor, Leopold II, reversed the course of the Empire by rescinding some Josephine reforms, but managed to preserve the unity of the Habsburg lands by showing a respect and sensitivity for local demands that Joseph lacked.

== See also ==
- Josef Vratislav Monse
- Suppression of the Jesuits
- Enlightened absolutism
- Wenzel Anton, Prince of Kaunitz-Rietberg
- Febronianism
- First Vatican Council
- Gallicanism
- Ultramontanism
- Kulturkampf
- Concordat of 1855
