= Schloss Leopoldskron =

Building in Salzburg, Austria

Coordinates: 47°47′17.74″N 13°2′19.29″E

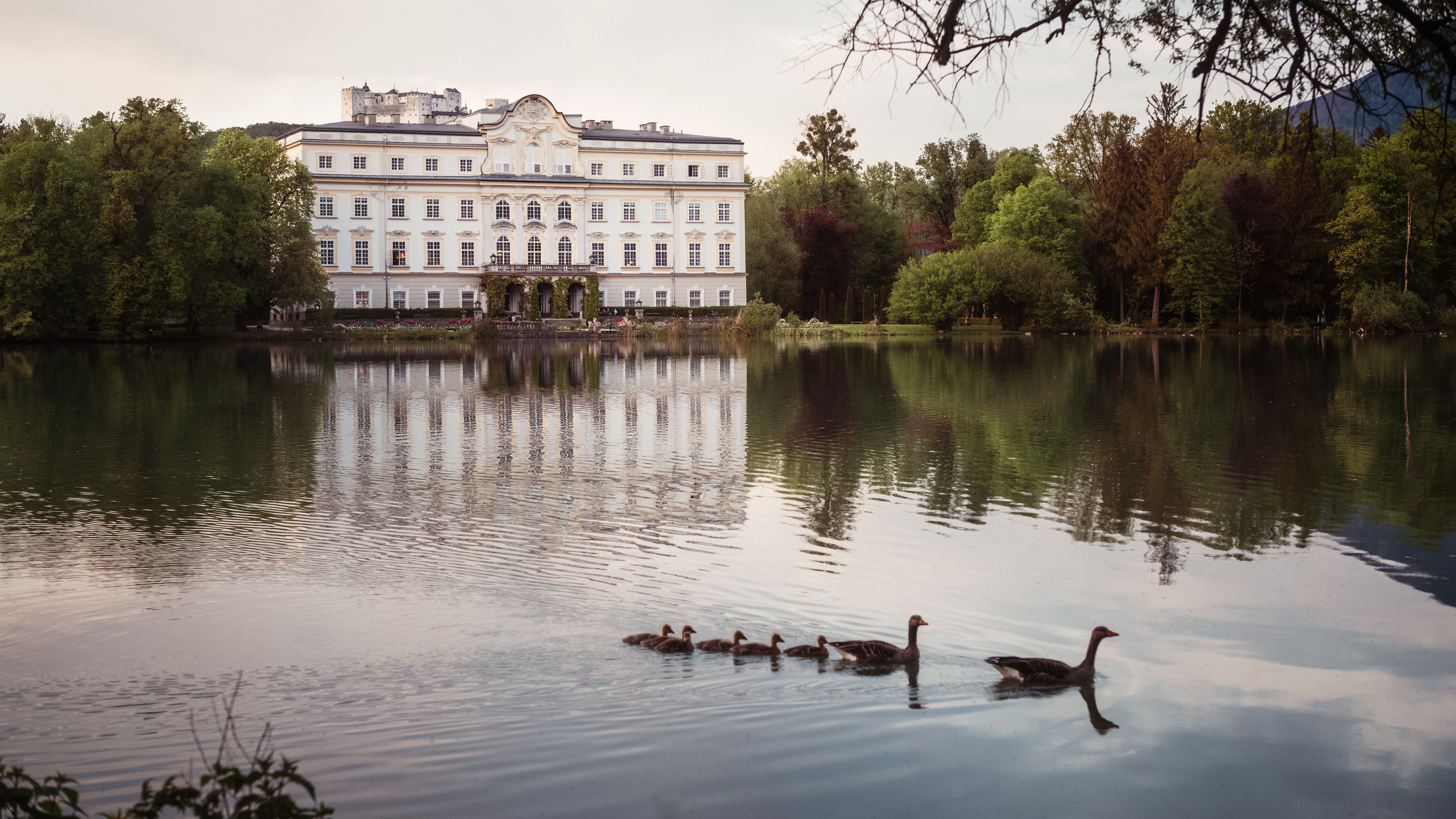
Schloss Leopoldskron and the Hohensalzburg fortress

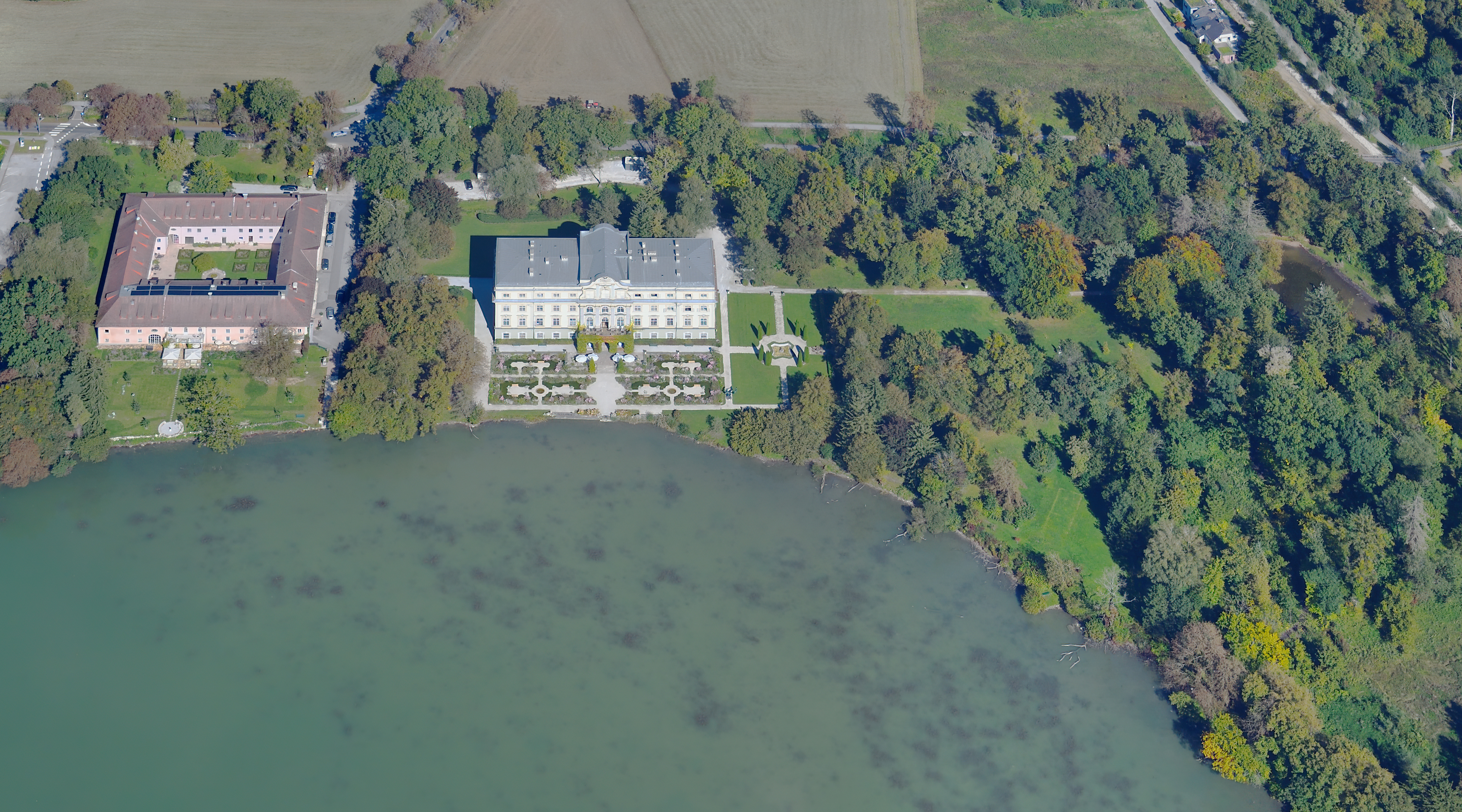
Aerial view of Schloss Leopoldskron and its park

Schloss Leopoldskron is a rococo palace and a national historic monument in Leopoldskron-Moos, a southern district of the city of Salzburg, Austria. The palace, and its surrounding seven hectare park, is located on the lake Leopoldskroner Weiher. The palace has been home to Salzburg Global Seminar since 1947. In 2014, the palace and the neighboring Meierhof building were opened as a privately owned hotel, Hotel Schloss Leopoldskron.

== History ==
Prince-Archbishop of Salzburg Count Leopold Anton Eleutherius von Firmian (1679–1744) commissioned the palace in 1736 on the shores of an existing pond after he had enriched himself in the process of expelling over 22,000 Protestants from Salzburg. He acquired the area between the palace and the Untersberg as a family estate, which he passed on in May 1744 to his nephew Count Laktanz Firmian, who used it to house his large collection of paintings. This included works of Titian, Dürer, Poussin, Rubens and Rembrandt.

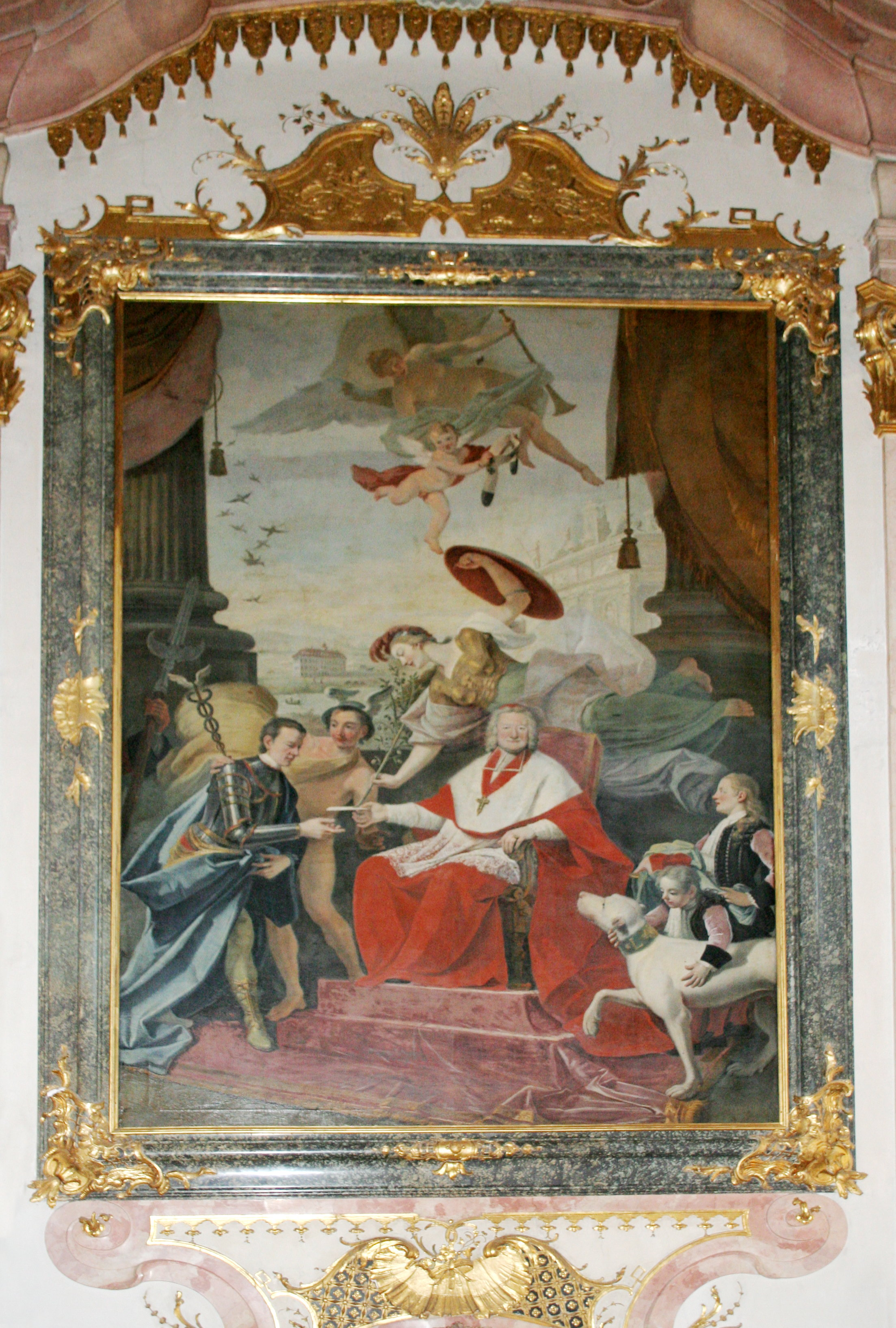
Archbishop Firmian of Salzburg gives Schloss Leopoldskron to his nephew Count Laktanz

After the death of the Archbishop in 1744, his heart was buried in the chapel of the palace, while the rest of his body was interred in Salzburg Cathedral. The palace was owned by the Firmian family until 1837, even after the death of Count Laktanz in 1786. George Zierer, the owner of a local shooting gallery, bought the palace and stripped it of most of the valuable interior decorations, including paintings, etchings, and sculptures.

The palace had several owners during the 19th century (including a banker and two waiters who wanted to use it as a hotel, King Ludwig I of Bavaria). In 1918 it was bought by Max Reinhardt, the noted theatre director and co-founder of the Salzburg Festival. By this time the palace was in urgent need of repair. With the work of local artisans, Reinhardt spent twenty years renovating the palace. Besides restoring the staircase, the Great Hall, and the Marble Hall, he created the Library, the Venetian Room and a garden theatre. He used the whole building for his theatre productions (the audiences had to move from room to room). He also used it as a gathering place for writers, actors, composers and designers from across the globe. Reinhardt escaped to the United States as persecution of the Jews increased, hoping the Nazis would be defeated in the war. He worked in Hollywood during World War II and died in New York in 1943, before the Allied victory.

The year after Austria’s annexation in 1938, the German government confiscated the palace as a national treasure during the taking of "Jewish property" throughout Austria. During the same year, Hermann Göring assigned the palace to Princess Stephanie von Hohenlohe, an Austrian who had been spying for the Nazis in Britain and Europe and who had many influential contacts. She was charged with transforming it into a guest house for prominent artists of the Reich, and to serve as a reception facility for Hitler's Berghof home. Von Hohenlohe, who knew Reinhardt before the annexation of Austria, was able to secure from the Nazis sixteen crates of Reinhardt's books, porcelain, silver and furniture and had them shipped to California, though the consolation of his tangible possessions were little comfort against the loss of the Leopoldskron. Once it came to light that Stephanie von Hohenlohe may have been a double agent, she fled to England, then America, returning the palace to Nazi hands until the end of the war.

By the end of the war, a bomb had exploded in the garden. It shattered the windows, destroyed a chandelier in the library on the ground floor and sent shrapnel fragments into the murals in the Chinese Room. It also damaged the stucco work in the south façade. Traces of the damage can still be seen today.

After the war, the property was returned to the Reinhardt estate. In 1946 Helene Thimig, the widow of Max Reinhardt, offered use of the palace to Clemens Heller, who founded the Salzburg Seminar in American Studies, a "Marshall Plan of the Mind," together with Scott Elledge and Richard Campbell, all Harvard graduate students. The Salzburg Seminar brought together young people from the countries that had been in conflict during World War II and originally offered education on American history, art, literature and culture, in a period when United States armed forces occupied parts of Germany and Austria. This was later transformed into a "global forum". Since 1947, more than 500 sessions of the Seminars have been held on a wide variety of issues.

In 1959 the Salzburg Global Seminar purchased the palace, and in 1973 the adjacent Meierhof, which was part of the original Firmian estate. They have made extensive renovations and restorations to enable the palace to be used as a conference center and venue for events other than the Salzburg Seminar. In early 2014, 50 rooms in the Meierhof, the Meierhof Café and the reception area underwent a substantial two-month renovation. The renovation included three The Sound of Music-themed rooms. In February 2014, the property reopened under its new name, Hotel Schloss Leopoldskron.

Hotel Schloss Leopoldskron is a member of Castle Hotels & Mansions, Historic Hotels of Europe, and partner of Climate Alliance Austria, Europe's biggest climate-protection network.

In 2015, the Historic Hotels of Europe awarded the Schloss the "Best Historic Hotel of Europe" award. In the same year, the Schloss achieved a Certificate of Excellence from TripAdvisor. In 2016, the Schloss placed second in the Historic Hotels of Europe's award for a "Best Historic Hotel with 'A Story to Tell'".

Notable hotel guests have included Prince Charles, Bill Gates, Kofi Annan, Arnold Schwarzenegger, Hillary Rodham Clinton, Ruth Bader Ginsburg and many more.

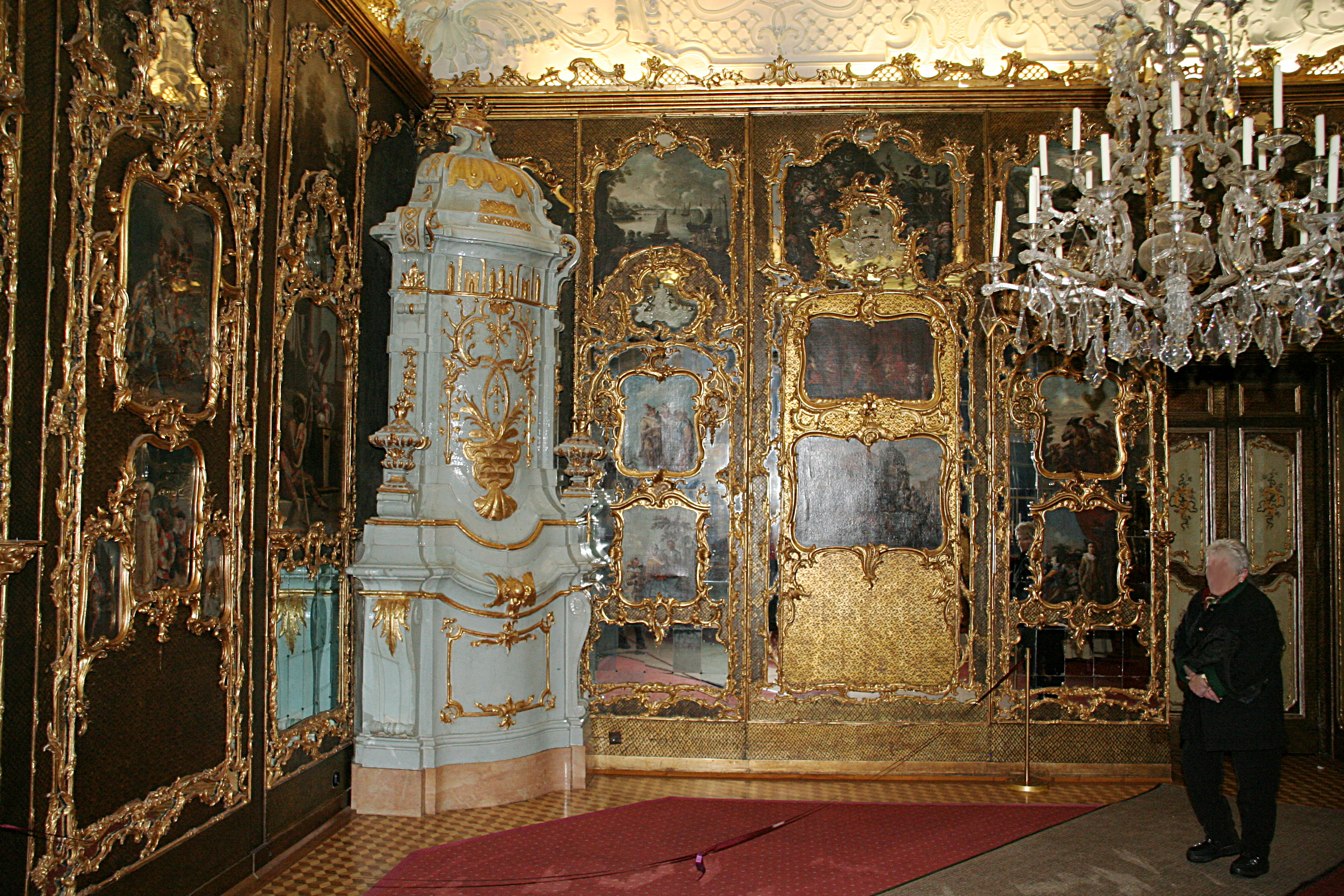
Spiegelsaal

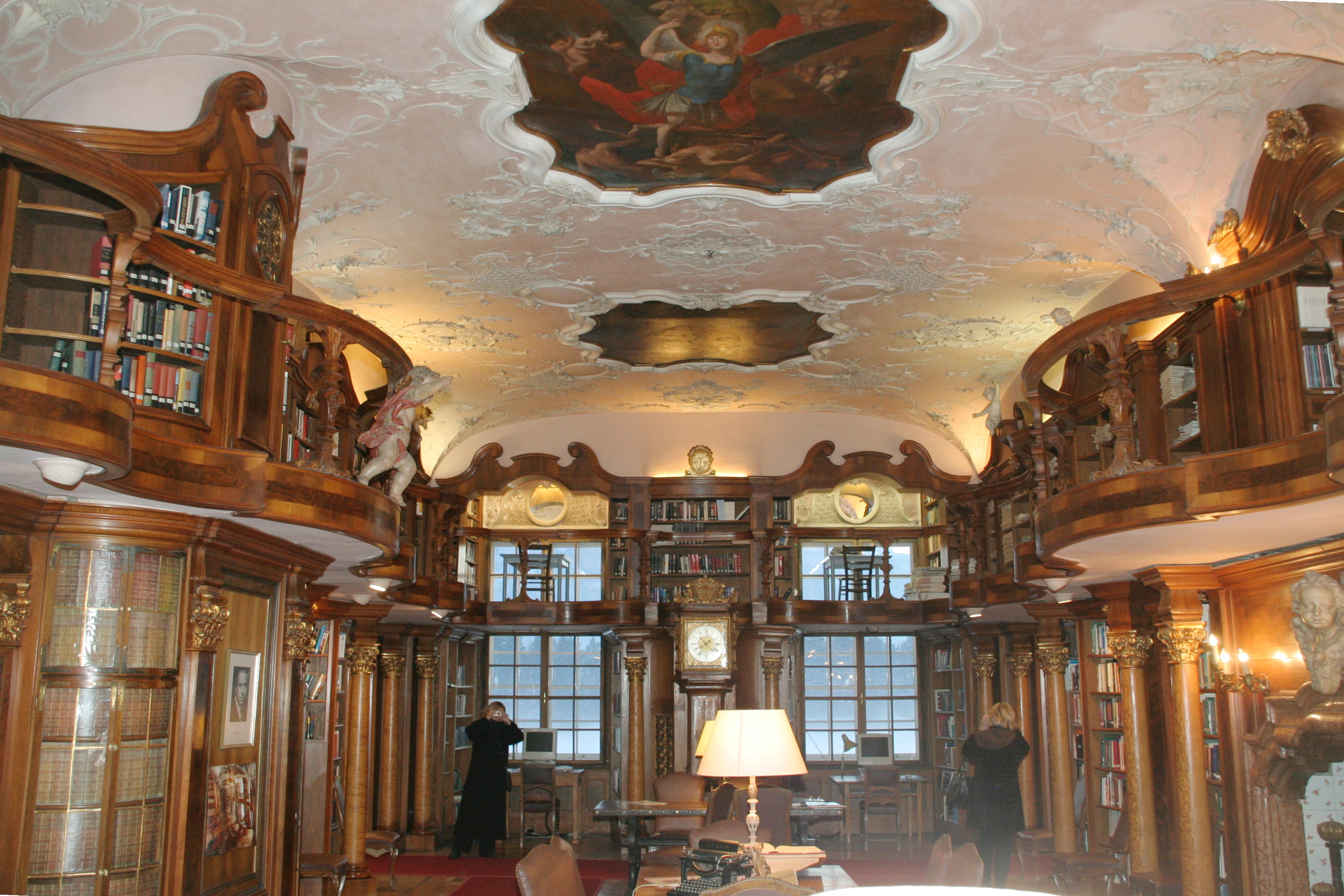
Library

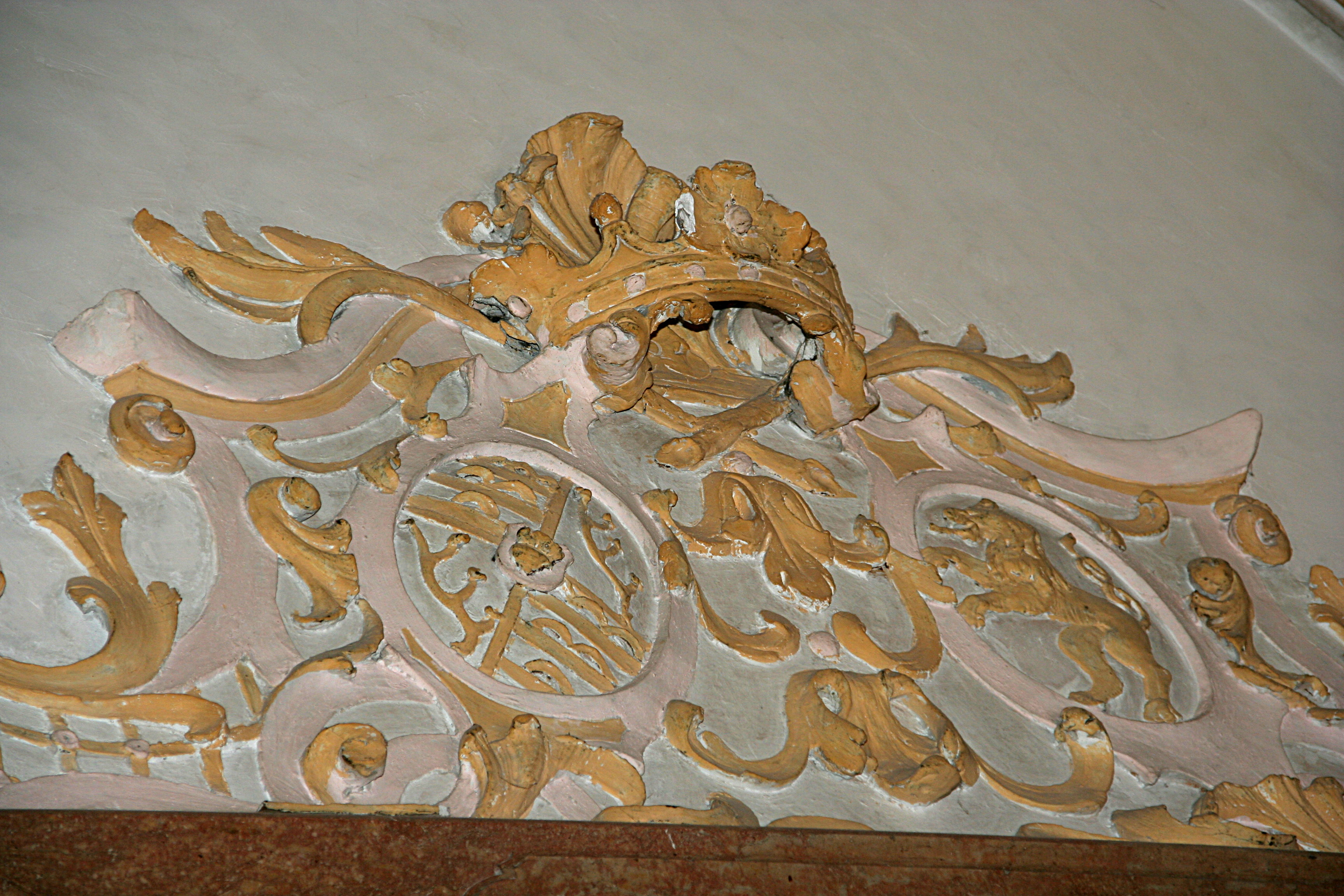
Stucco ceiling

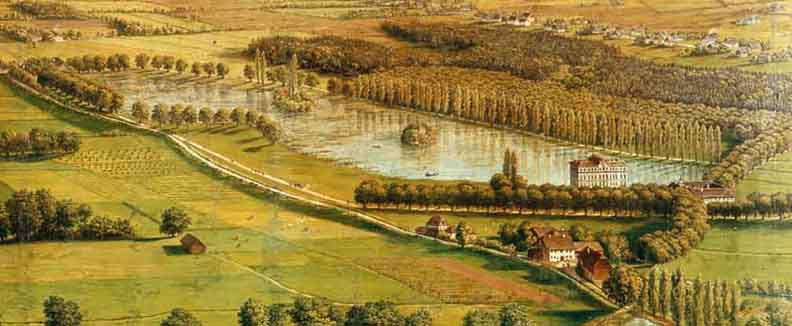
Schloss Leopoldskron in 1829 by Johann Michael Sattler (1786–1847)

== The Sound of Music ==
In 1964, parts of the film The Sound of Music, directed by Robert Wise and starring Julie Andrews, were shot in Salzburg. Because the Salzburg Seminar did not give permission for filming at Schloss Leopoldskron, several scenes were filmed on the adjacent Meierhof property which, at the time, still belonged to the publisher Bertelsmann. To that end replicas of Leopoldskron's terrace and "seahorse-gate" were erected on the Meierhof grounds. A matte painting of the view towards the Leopoldskron pond was also used. The famous gazebo, shown in the film only from the outside, was originally located on the Meierhof property, too. (It was later moved to the other side of the Leopoldskron pond and then to the Hellbrunn Palace.) Schloss Leopoldskron is never seen in the film; the rear façade of the building shown in those scenes as the Trapp residence is Schloss Frohnburg's which also provided the front façade. The decor of the ballroom used for some interior scenes shot in Hollywood was inspired by Leopoldskron's Venetian Room.

Maria on the replica of Schloss Leopoldskron's walkway.

Children falling into the Leopoldskroner Weiher.

Liesl and Rolf singing in front of the gazebo on a Hollywood sound stage.
