= Leopold Anton von Firmian =

Austrian archbishop (1679–1744)

His Grace Leopold Anton von Firmian
- Prince-Archbishop of Salzburg
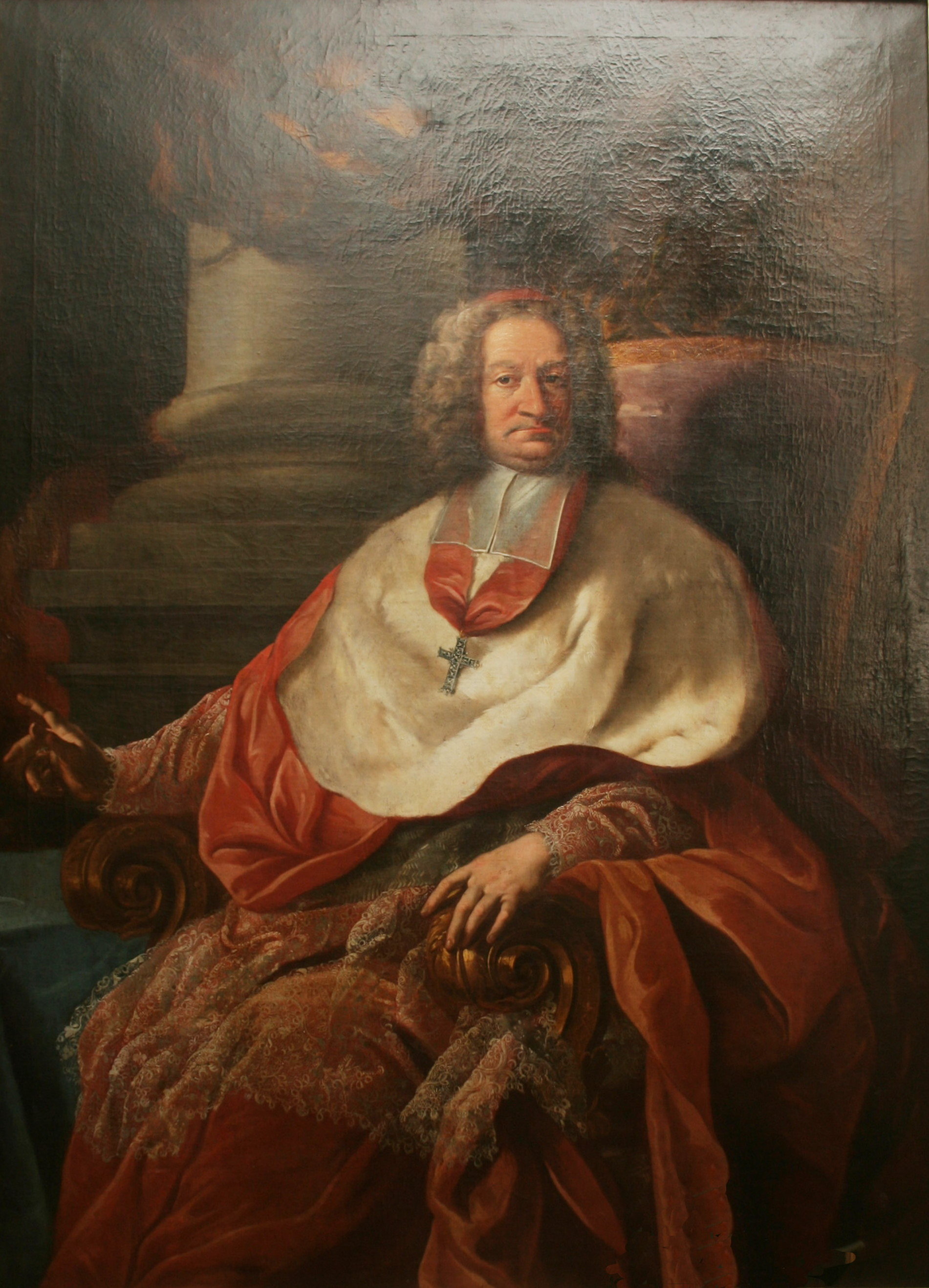
- Contemporary portrait, Schloss Leopoldskron
- Church: Roman Catholic Church
- Archdiocese: Salzburg
- See: Cathedral of Saints Rupert and Vergilius
- Installed: 22 December 1727
- Term ended: 22 October 1744
- Predecessor: Franz Anton von Harrach
- Successor: Jakob Ernst von Liechtenstein-Kastelkorn
- Other posts: Bishop of Seckau; Bishop of Lavant

Personal details
- Born: 11 March 1679 Munich, Bavaria, Holy Roman Empire
- Died: 22 October 1744 (aged 65) Salzburg, Archbishopric of Salzburg, Holy Roman Empire
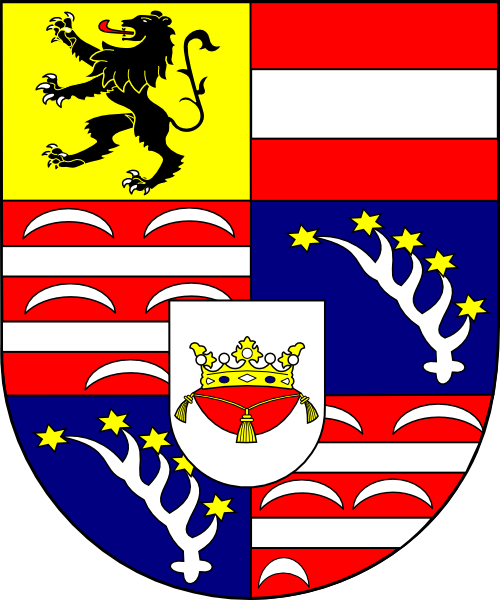
- Coat of arms

Leopold Anton Eleutherius Freiherr von Firmian (11 March 1679 – 22 October 1744) was Bishop of Lavant 1718–24, Bishop of Seckau 1724–27 and Prince-Archbishop of Salzburg from 1727 until his death.

== Early life ==
He was born in Munich, into the Austrian House of Firmian, one of the oldest Tyrolean noble families whose seat was Sigmundskron castle in the County of Tyrol, as the son of Imperial envoy, Baron Franz Wilhelm von Firmian (b. 1636) and his wife, Countess Maria Viktoria von Thun und Hohenstein. His maternal uncle Count Johann Ernst von Thun was Bishop of Seckau from 1679 until 1687 and Prince-Archbishop of Salzburg from 1687 to 1709.

Leopold Anton von Firmian was the uncle of Cardinal Leopold Ernst von Firmian, also prince-bishop of Passau. His nephew, Karl Joseph von Firmian, the Austrian plenipotentiary minister in Milan, was renowned as a patron of the arts, including poets such as Giuseppe Parini, musicians such as Johann Ernst Eberlin and painters such as Giambettino Cignaroli. While Leopold Anton was an early patron of Leopold Mozart, his nephew, Count Karl von Firmian appears to have been one of the patrons of Amadeus Mozart's opera Mitridate, Re di Ponto in Milan circa 1770.

== Ecclesiastical career ==
Firmian had prepared for an ecclesiastical career, received his ordination in Rome in 1707 and became provost of the Salzburg chapter in 1713. Pope Clement XI appointed him Bishop of Lavant in 1718, Pope Benedict XIII also made him Bishop of Seckau in 1724. On 4 October 1727, he was elected Archbishop of Salzburg. He had Schloss Klessheim finished and Schloss Leopoldskron erected as his private residence.

Firmian saw it as his goal to give the Catholic Church its "old power and glory". Accordingly, he tried to convert the Protestant minority living in the archbishopric (especially in Pongau) to the Catholic faith—he had Jesuits preach in the village squares, all villagers had to appear at threat of severe penalties. On 31 October 1731, the 214th anniversary of Martin Luther's nailing of his Ninety-five Theses to the door of the church in Wittenberg, Firmian signed an Edict of Expulsion of Protestants declaring that all Protestants in the archbishopric had to recant their non-Catholic beliefs or be banished within days. To enforce his order Firmian brought over 6000 Austrian soldiers to Salzburg. Surprisingly, over twenty thousand of his subjects professed Protestant beliefs and were exiled. Most of those who survived their flight were received by King Frederick William I of Prussia and settled around Gumbinnen in East Prussia. Others found refuge in Hanover, the Netherlands, and the British colony of Georgia. The expulsion drew vehement protests from the Protestant body in the Reichstag and the Protestant countries of Europe. After the expulsion of the Protestants, Firmian divided the Salzburg territory into four mission areas: Augustinian, Capuchin, Benedictine and Franciscan.

Firmian completed construction on Schloss Klessheim, he had the Kapitelschwemme and Marstallschwemme redesigned, and constructed the Schloss Leopoldskron for his nephew Franz Laktanz Firmian.

Archbishop Firmian is buried at the crypt of Salzburg Cathedral while his heart rests under the floor of his 'dearly beloved' Schloss Leopoldskron chapel.

== Note ==
- Freiherr is a title, translated as Baron, not a first or middle name.
