= Stephen Salyer =

President and CEO of the Salzburg Global Seminar

Stephen Salyer is the former president and chief executive officer of Salzburg Global Seminar, an independent, non-governmental organization based in Salzburg, Austria and Washington, D.C. He has been president and chief executive officer of Public Radio International and in 1981, he was made vice president and director of the educational division at WNET/Thirteen in New York City, the flagship producer for the PBS television network.
