= Leopold Ernst von Firmian =

Austrian bishop and cardinal (1708–1783)

His Eminence Leopold Ernst von Firmian
- Prince-Bishop of Passau
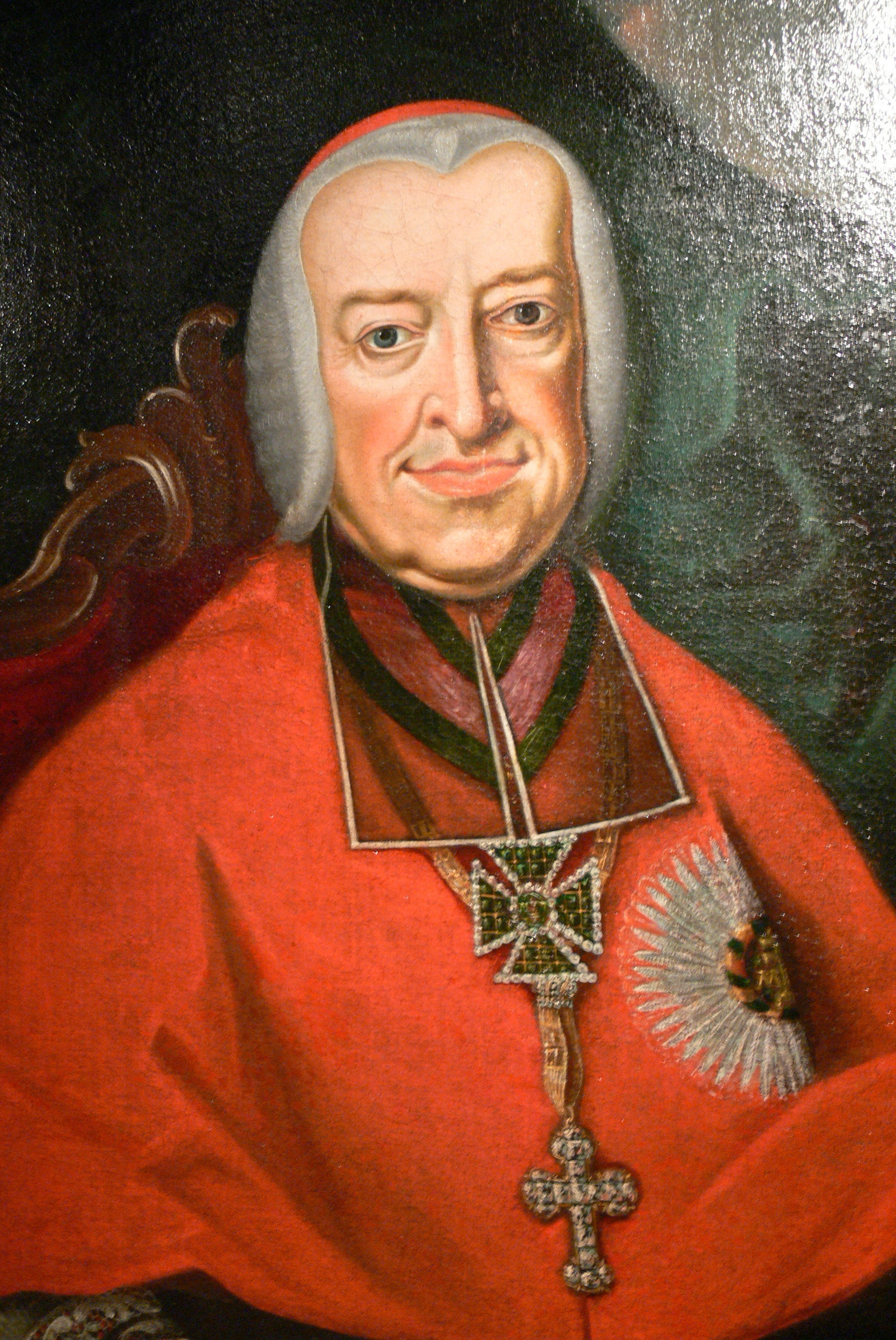
- Church: Catholic Church
- Diocese: Passau
- Appointed: 1763
- Term ended: 1783
- Predecessor: Joseph Maria von Thun
- Successor: Joseph Franz Auersperg
- Other posts: Cardinal-Priest of San Pietro in Montorio (1772-1783)
- Previous posts: Bishop of Seckau (1739-1763); Administrator of Trent (1748-1758)

Orders
- Ordination: 25 September 1729 by Leopold Anton von Firmian
- Created cardinal: 14 December 1772 by Pope Clement XIV
- Rank: Cardinal-Priest

Personal details
- Born: 22 September 1708 Trento, Italy
- Died: 13 March 1783 (aged 74) Passau, Germany
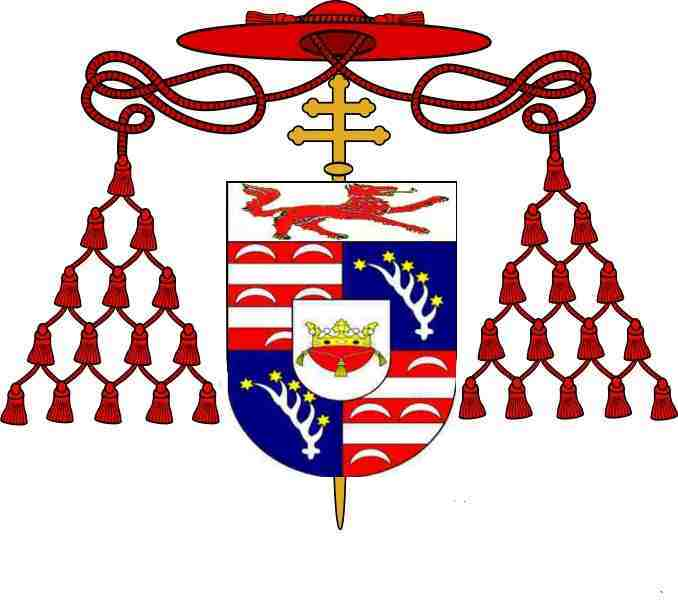
- Coat of arms

Leopold Ernst von Firmian (September 22, 1708 – 13 March 1783) was an Austrian bishop and cardinal.

He was Bishop of Seckau from 1739 to 1763, campaigning against Protestantism. He also acted as coadjutor bishop or administrator of the Bishopric of Trento, from 1748 to 1758. As Prince-Bishop of Passau from 1763 to 1783, he was a more tolerant reforming Catholic. He became Cardinal of S. Pietro in Montorio in 1772.

== Family ==
Firmian, came from the Tyrolean noble family of Firmian. Born in Trent, he was the eldest son of imperial chamberlain Baron Franz Alfons Georg von Firmian and his wife Countess Barbara Elisabeth von Thun. Leopold Anton Freiherr von Firmian, archbishop of Salzburg, was his uncle. His brother Franz was special confidant of Emperor Joseph; another brother was the Austrian plenipotentiary of Milan, Charles Joseph von Firmian.

== Life ==
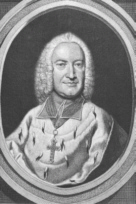
Leopold Ernst von Firmian (1708-1783)

After completing his studies at the gymnasium in Trent, he took up the study of philosophy in Graz. In 1726, he entered the Collegium Germanicum in Rome to study theology. He left Rome for health reasons in 1729, and completed his law studies in Salzburg.

He was ordained by his uncle the archbishop, on September 25, 1729, with papal dispensation as he had not yet reached canonical age. He became Dean of the metropolitan cathedral chapter of Salzburg, where he distinguished himself as an outstanding administrator, as well as a shrewd diplomat.

Firmian, became bishop of Seckau at age 31 and was also administrator of the suffragan bishopric of Trento for ten years, but the cathedral chapter largely opposed any of his proposed reforms. From 1741 to 1763, he served as vicar general for the Salzburg districts of Styria and the Neustadt. He had reservations about the many holidays and pilgrimages and discouraged "superstitious forms of religious life."

== Prince-bishop ==
In 1763, with the endorsement of the court, he was elected to the bishopric of Passau, which at that time no longer reached as far as Hungary as it once had, but still included almost all of Upper Austria and part of Lower Austria.

As a close advisor to Empress Maria Theresa, he initiated the school reform of 1769/74 introducing of compulsory education. He also established a seminary in Passau for the education of secular priests. During the famine years of 1770-1772, he managed at its own expense to bring grain from Italy to Passau.

In 1772, he was created a cardinal by Pope Clement XIV and appointed cardinal priest of the church of San Pietro in Montorio.

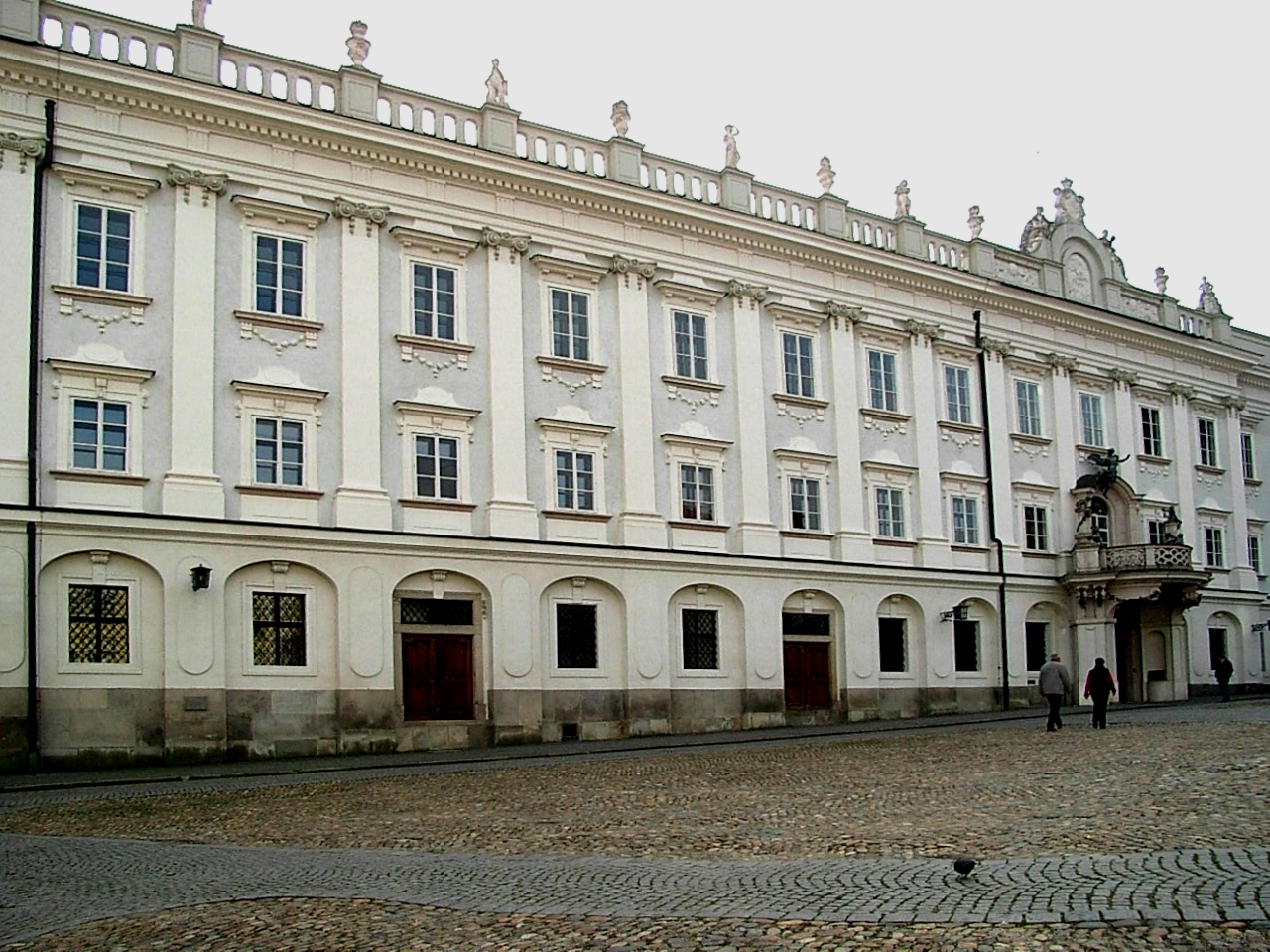
Neue Residenz Passau

In his secular sphere of power, he completed the Neue Residenz in Passau with its façade by Melchior Hefele, as well as the reclamation of parts of the Bavarian Forest (the villages of Vorder-, Mitter- and Hinterfirmiansreut(h) near the Czech border are reminders of his work). Besides a hunting lodge at Thyrnau, he also built the General Hospital, and new roads.

In 1765, he bought back the Sieben künischen Dörfer, an area around Wollaberg, from Austria for 137,787 florins, which had fallen to the Habsburgs by war in 1506. Emperor Joseph II, who was critical of the church, held him in such high esteem that he awarded him the grand cross of the Austrian Order of Sankt Stefan, and waited until Firmian's death to separate the Austrian territories from the diocese of Passau (by founding the bishoprics of Linz and Sankt Pölten).

After the abolition of the Jesuit Order in 1773, he founded an academy in Passau with ex-Jesuits as teachers. Plays and public amusements were prohibited on Sundays despite the objections of the people. Unlike his relative Leopold Anton Graf von Firmian in Salzburg, he strove for religious tolerance; for example, he allowed Protestants to be buried in the Catholic cemetery as early as 1777.

Prince-Bishop Leopold was the confirmation godfather and patron of Karl Joseph von Riccabona, who was Bishop of Passau from 1826 to 1839.

Firmian died on March 13, 1783, aged 74, and was buried in the Passau bishop's crypt. After Firmian's death all Austrian territories were separated from the diocese; 20 years later, the secular rule of the Passau bishops ended.
