= Outline of the California genocide =

Genocide of Native Americans (1846–1873)

California genocide
- Part of the California Indian Wars and Native American genocide in the United States
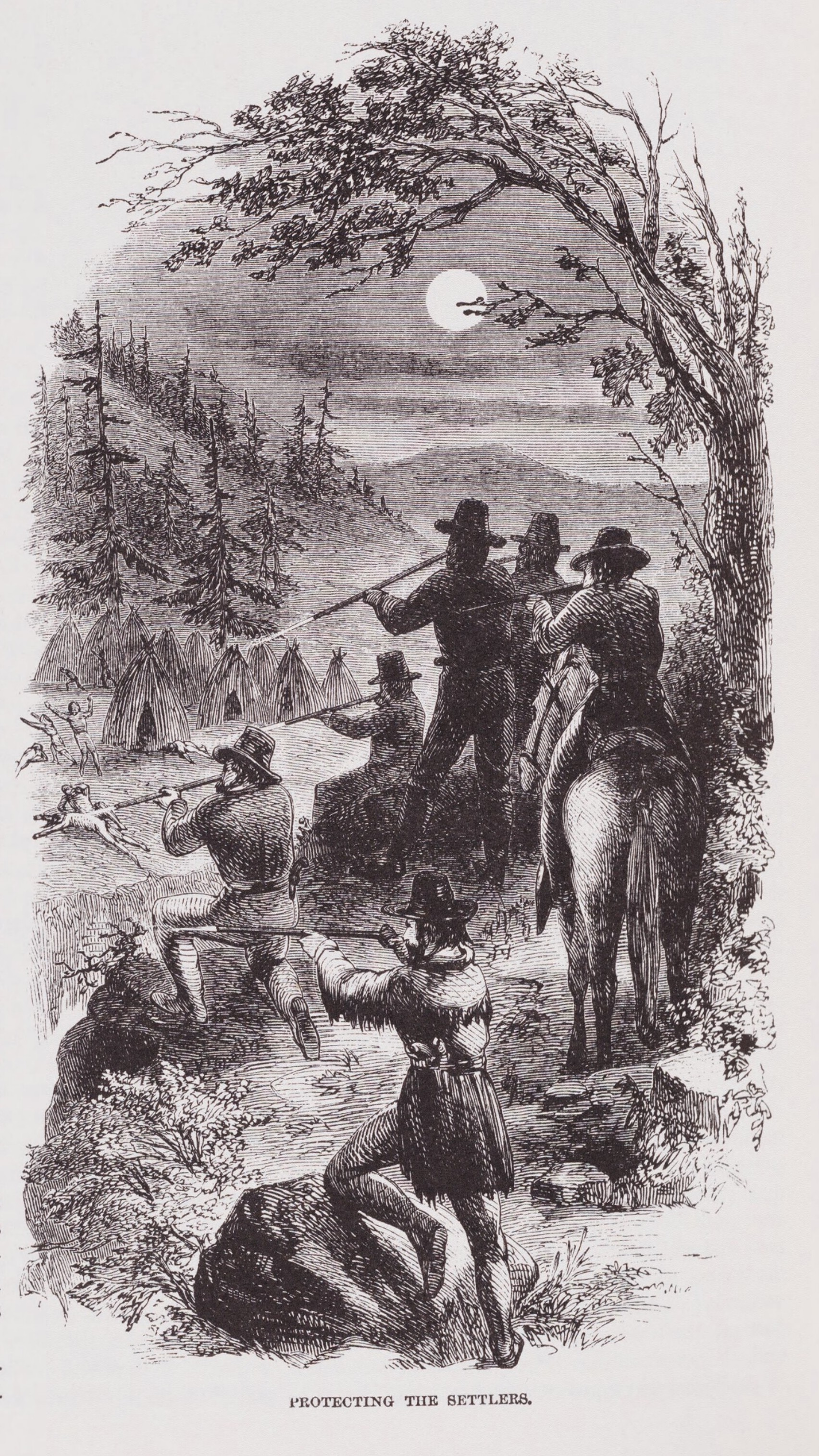
- "Protecting The Settlers", illustration by J. R. Browne in The Indians Of California, 1864
- Location: California
- Date: 1846–1873
- Target: Indigenous Californians
- Attack type: Genocide, ethnic cleansing, human hunting, slavery, rape, Indian removal
- Deaths: See California genocide
- Injuries: See California genocide
- Victims: Indigenous peoples of California, (see section below for specific tribes).
- Perpetrators: United States Army, California Militia, American pioneers
- Motive: Manifest Destiny, American imperialism, White supremacy

The following outline is provided as an overview of and topical guide to English Wikipedia articles about the genocide of Native Americans in California.

== Overview ==
The California genocide was a series of genocidal massacres of the indigenous peoples of California by United States soldiers and settlers during the 19th century. It began following the American conquest of California in the Mexican–American War and the subsequent influx of American settlers to the region as a result of the California gold rush. Between 1846 and 1873, it is estimated that settlers killed between 9,492 and 16,094 Californian Natives; up to several thousand were also starved or worked to death. Forced labor, kidnapping, rape, child separation and forced displacement were widespread during the genocide, and were encouraged, tolerated, and even carried out by American government officials and military commanders.

== Main articles ==
- California genocide – A series of genocidal massacres, forced labor, displacement, and other violence against Indigenous Californians between 1846 and 1873 by U.S. Army, state militias, and settlers.
- California Indian Wars – A series of wars, battles, and massacres from 1850 to 1880 between the United States Army and California State Militia versus Indigenous peoples of California, including events like the Bald Hills War and Owens Valley Indian War.

== Background ==
- Indigenous peoples of California – Diverse Native American groups that lived in California for millennia, with more than 100 distinct tribes prior to European contact.
- California Indian Wars – Series of military campaigns, massacres, and conflicts between the U.S. Army, California state militias, and Native Californians, taking place roughly from 1850 to 1880.
- History of slavery in California – Encompasses the forced servitude and enslavement of Native Americans, especially under the 1850 “Act for the Government and Protection of Indians.”
- Manifest Destiny – 19th-century doctrine holding that U.S. expansion across North America was preordained and justified, fueling settler colonialism and Native displacement.
- American imperialism – U.S. policy of extending its influence and power, including through territorial expansion and military force, which encompassed actions in California.
- White supremacy – Ideology asserting the superiority of whites, which provided ideological justification for genocidal violence and legal systems targeting Native Californians.
- California Gold Rush – Massive migration of settlers to California from 1848 to 1855 following the discovery of gold; a surge that accelerated land theft, violence, and depopulation of Indigenous communities.
- Conquest of California – The 1846–1847 U.S. military campaign during the Mexican–American War that led to U.S. sovereignty over California and paved the way for settler colonialism.
- California statehood – Admission of California to the U.S. in 1850, which institutionalized anti-Indigenous laws and empowered state-backed violence against Native peoples.
- History of California before 1900 – Overview of California's colonial past and 19th-century transformations, crucially including its impact on Native populations amid U.S. expansion.

== Victims ==
- Achomawi – Indigenous people of northeastern California, part of the Pit River Tribe. Estimated ~70 killed in an 1859 massacre.
- Cahuilla – Native people of inland Southern California. Suffered displacement and cultural disruption; no specific genocide-era death toll recorded.
- Chimariko – Small Indigenous group from the Trinity River area. Population collapsed during the 19th century; specific massacre toll not documented.
- Chumash people – Coastal Native Californians. Population declined from ~13,000 to a few thousand due to mission violence and disease.
- Esselen – Indigenous people of Big Sur region. Nearly extinct by the late 19th century due to missionization and displacement.
- Gabrielino-Tongva Tribe – Native people of the Los Angeles Basin. Population decimated by mission labor, disease, and displacement.
- Hupa – Trinity River people. Population declined from ~1,000 to ~500 by 1910, partially due to settler violence.
- Karuk – Klamath River people. Population fell from ~1,500 to ~800 by 1910 amid warfare and disruption.
- Konkow – A branch of the Maidu tribe. Massacres and enslavement drastically reduced their numbers in the mid-19th century.
- Luiseño – Southern California tribe. Population declined from ~10,000 to a few hundred by 1900 following land loss and conflict.
- Maidu – Indigenous people of the northern Sierra Nevada and Sacramento Valley. Population declined from ~9,000 to ~1,100 by 1910 due to massacres and disease.
- Miwok – Northern California groups including Coast, Plains, and Sierra Miwok. Numbers fell from ~9,000 to ~700 between 1800 and 1910.
- Nomlaki – Sacramento Valley people. Severely impacted by settler violence; no specific death toll recorded.
- Ohlone – Central California coastal peoples. Population fell from ~26,000 to fewer than 1,000 by 1900; much due to mission and post-statehood violence.
- Paiute – Western Paiute in northeastern California. Deaths from conflict and starvation in the Owens Valley War; precise toll unknown.
- Pomo – Northwestern California people. As many as 800 killed in the 1850 Bloody Island massacre alone.
- Rumsen people – Ohlone subgroup from the Monterey Peninsula. Heavily reduced by disease and Spanish missionization; no specific genocide-era toll.
- Salinan people – Central coast tribe. Population fell sharply by the late 1800s; numbers likely in the hundreds, but poorly documented.
- Tolowa – Northernmost California tribe. At least 900 killed between 1852 and 1856, including ~450 at Yontoket in 1853.
- Wintu – People of the upper Sacramento River. Hundreds killed in multiple massacres, including 150 at Bridge Gulch (1852).
- Wiyot people – Humboldt Bay tribe. ~80 to 250 killed in the 1860 Indian Island massacre.
- Yuki people – Round Valley tribe. Over 1,000 killed during state-sponsored campaigns and vigilante violence in the 1850s–1860s.
- Yurok – Klamath River and Pacific coast people. Population dropped from ~3,100 to ~700 by 1910; many deaths from settler violence and displacement.

== Perpetrators ==
- United States Army – Federal military force that conducted numerous campaigns, battles, and massacres against Indigenous peoples in California from roughly 1850 to 1880.
- California State Militia – State-organized volunteer militia active in the early 1850s, often involved alongside the U.S. Army in the California Indian Wars; these units later evolved into what became the California National Guard.
- American pioneers – Influx of settlers during and after the 1848 Gold Rush led to widespread settler violence, land seizure, and participation in massacres against Native Californians, often justified by Manifest Destiny.
- California State Rangers – A short-lived (May–August 1853) paramilitary state police force formed under state militia authority; while primarily created to pursue outlaws like Joaquin Murrieta, their structure and mission mirrored militia tactics used against Indigenous peoples.
- Peter Hardeman Burnett (1807, Tennessee – 1895, California) – First Governor of California; advocated for Native extermination policies.
- Kit Carson (1809, Kentucky – 1868, Colorado) – Frontiersman and U.S. Army officer involved in campaigns against Native Americans.
- John Wynn Davidson (1825, Virginia – 1881, Minnesota) – U.S. Army brigadier general who co-led the Bloody Island massacre during the California genocide.
- John C. Frémont (1813, Georgia – 1890, New York) – Military officer and explorer; led expeditions that resulted in massacres of Native people.
- Serranus Clinton Hastings (1814, New York – 1893, California) – First Chief Justice of California; financed militias responsible for massacres of Yuki people.
- Andrew Kelsey (c. 1810s, Kentucky – 1849, California) – Settler whose mistreatment of Pomo people led to the Bloody Island massacre.
- Benjamin Kelsey (1813, Kentucky – 1889, California) – Early settler; enslaved Native people and part of campaigns that triggered massacres.
- Edward Kern (1822, Pennsylvania – 1863, Pennsylvania) – Explorer and U.S. Army officer; participated in Kern and Sutter massacres of Native people.
- Henry P. Larrabee (c. 1830, Ohio – 1906, Kansas) – Militiaman notorious for his role in the 1860 Wiyot massacre and other killings of Native people.
- Nathaniel Lyon (1818, Connecticut – 1861, Missouri) – U.S. Army officer who led the Bloody Island massacre.
- Moses A. McLaughlin (1822, Indiana – 1908, California) – Commander in the Owens Valley Indian War against Native tribes. *(Exact birth/death sourced from census and regimental records.)*
- John Sutter (1803, Switzerland – 1880, Washington Territory) – Swiss settler whose land policies and forced labor practices harmed Native populations.
- Walter S. Jarboe (1829, Kentucky – 1865, California) – Led the Eel River Rangers; responsible for mass killings during the Mendocino War.
- John B. Weller (1812, Ohio – 1875, California) – California governor who authorized funding for anti‑Native militia campaigns.

== Events ==
- Bear Flag Revolt (1846) – Revolt by American settlers against Mexican authorities in Sonoma, resulting in the brief establishment of the California Republic.
- California Gold Rush (1848–1855) – Massive migration to California after gold discovery, accelerating settler violence, land dispossession, and disease among Indigenous peoples.
- California Indian Wars (1850s–1880) – Series of military campaigns, skirmishes, and massacres between the U.S. Army, state militias, and Native Californians.
- Bald Hills War (1858–1864) – Conflict in Northern California between settlers and tribes including the Hupa, Chilula, Whilkut, Mattole, Nongatl, Sinkyone, and Wiyot.
- Klamath River Wars (1850–1855) – U.S. and militia campaigns against tribes along the Klamath River, part of broader California Indian Wars.
- Mendocino War (1859–1860) – Series of settler and militia campaigns in Mendocino County targeting the Yuki people; resulted in hundreds of Indigenous deaths.
- Owens Valley Indian War (1861–1865) – Conflict between the U.S. Army and settlers against Paiute and other tribes in Owens Valley; resulted in forced removal and significant loss of life.

=== Massacres ===
- Achulet massacre (1854) – Massacre of Tolowa people near Lake Earl by American settlers.
- Asbill massacre (1854) – Killing of approximately 40 Yuki people in Round Valley by settlers led by Pierce Asbill.
- Bloody Island massacre (1850) – U.S. Army forces under Captain Nathaniel Lyon killed up to 200 Pomo people on an island in Clear Lake.
- Bridge Gulch massacre (1852) – Settlers killed more than 150 Wintu people in retaliation for the death of a settler.
- Kabyai Creek massacre (1852) – U.S. cavalry and settlers killed 52 Winnemem Wintu during a ceremonial gathering near McCloud River.
- Kern and Sutter massacres (1850) – Joint military operations led by U.S. forces and settlers that killed numerous Native people in the Central Valley.
- Keyesville massacre (1863) – U.S. troops and settlers killed 35 Native men near Keyesville following roundup orders.
- Konkow Maidu slaver massacre (1847) – American settlers killed Konkow Maidu individuals while capturing others for enslavement near present-day Oroville.
- Rancheria Tulea massacre (1854) – Mass killing of Native Californians by settlers in the southern Central Valley; sometimes cited in historical records but poorly documented.
- Round Valley Settler Massacres of 1856–1859 (1856–1859) – Series of massacres by settlers against the Yuki people; death tolls estimated in the hundreds.
- Sacramento River massacre (1846) – John C. Frémont's forces killed an unknown number of Wintu people along the Sacramento River.
- Sutter Buttes Massacre (1846) – U.S. troops massacred Native Californians near the Sutter Buttes during early stages of American conquest.
- Temecula massacre (1847) – Cahuilla warriors and Mexican soldiers killed over 100 Luiseño people in retaliation for a previous ambush.
- 1860 Wiyot massacre (1860) – Over 80 Wiyot people, mostly women and children, killed by settlers on Indian Island near Eureka.
- Yontoket massacre (1853) – Settlers killed approximately 450 Tolowa people during a ceremonial gathering near the mouth of the Smith River.

== Miscellaneous ==
- Act for the Government and Protection of Indians (1850) – California statute that legalized the indenture and forced labor of Native Americans, enabled seizure of Indigenous children, and facilitated widespread exploitation.
- Forced labor in California (1769–1874) – Explores the long history of coerced Indigenous labor, from Spanish mission exploitation through Mexican ranchos to Gold Rush-era indenture.
- Spanish missions in California (1769–1833) – A network of 21 Franciscan missions established by Spain, which used mission labor, disease, and cultural suppression that contributed to significant Native population decline.

== See also ==
- Bibliography of California history
- An American Genocide – a book by Benjamin Madley
- List of Indian massacres in North America
- List of genocides committed by the United States
- American Indian Wars
