= Kletsel Dehe Wintun Nation of the Cortina Rancheria =

Native American tribe

Coordinates: 39°01′06″N 122°17′25″W

- General location of the Cortina Rancheria

Total population
- 117 enrolled members, 19 rancheria residents

Regions with significant populations
- Colusa County, California

Languages
- English, formerly Wintu

Related ethnic groups
- Wintun (Nomlaki and Patwin), Yokuts

The Kletsel Dehe Wintun Nation of the Cortina Rancheria is a federally recognized tribe of Indigenous people of California. They are Wintun people, who historically spoke Wintuan languages.

They're headquartered in Williams, California, and they have approximately 270 enrolled citizens. They were previously known as the Kletsel Dehe Band of Wintun Indians, Cortina Indian Rancheria, and Cortina Indian Rancheria of Wintun Indians of California.

== Government ==
Charlie Wright serves as their chairperson.

== Rancheria ==
The Cortina Rancheria is an Indian reservation in Colusa County, California, at an elevation of 1,312 feet (400 m). The rancheria is 640 acres large in area. It is located about 70 miles northwest of Sacramento and 15 miles west of Arbuckle, California. As of the 2010 Census the population was 21.

== Activity ==
The tribe partnered with California State University, Chico, to study water quality and purification systems.

== See also ==
- Waikosel, California
- Wintu-Nomlaki traditional narratives
