= Colusa Indian Community =

Indian tribe in California, United States

Coordinates: 39°15′01″N 122°01′33″W

Cachil DeHe Band of Wintun Indians of the Colusa Indian Community of the Colusa Rancheria
Total population
- 55

Regions with significant populations
- United States ( California)

Languages
- English, formerly Wintun

Religion
- Roundhouse religion, Christianity

Related ethnic groups
- other Wintu people (Wintu, Nomlaki, and Patwin)

The Cachil DeHe Band of Wintun Indians of the Colusa Indian Community of the Colusa Rancheria is a federally recognized tribe of Wintun Native Americans from central California.

== Reservation ==
Location of Colusa Rancheria

The tribe's reservation is the Colusa Rancheria, also known as the Cachildehe Rancheria. The ranchería is located in Colusa County, California and was founded in 1907. The average elevation is 59 feet (18 m), and the ranchería is 573 acres (2.32 km^{2}) large. 273 acres (1.10 km^{2}) are in federal trust and 300 acres (1.2 km^{2}) are owned privately by the tribe. Population is approximately 77.

== Government ==
The Colusa Indian Colony is governed by a democratically elected tribal council. They are headquartered in Colusa, California, and their current tribal chairperson is Wayne Mitchum.

== Language ==
Traditionally, the tribe spoke the Wintun/Patwin language, a Wintuan language of the Penutian language family. The Colusa Indian Community Council published a language book and are working on language CDs and DVDs to help foster language preservation.

The traditional language spoken by Wintun (Patwin) people was not Wintu, but Patwin or Wintun. Wintu was a Penutian language spoken by the Wintu people of lands north of Cottonwood Creek in the area of Redding, California.

== Economic development ==
The tribe owns and operates Colusa Indian Energy, a power company that is planning to develop a data center on the tribe's land.

The tribe also owns and operates the Colusa Casino Resort, Table 45 (casual dining), 37 Seventy (fine dining), and Jack's Place (bar), all located inside Colusa Casino Resort.

== History ==
The Cachil Dehe Band of Wintun Indians, with 45 original members, ratified their constitution and by-laws on November 23, 1941. In 1969 the tribe started to build a traditional roundhouse and refurbished it in 1993.

== Education ==
The ranchería is served by the Colusa Unified School District.
