= Wintun (disambiguation) =

The Wintun are members of several related Native American peoples in Northern California.

Wintun may also refer to:

- Wintun language
- Wintun Glacier
- WINTUN type of VPN network driver

== See also ==
- Wintu
