= Paskenta, California =

Paskenta
- Census-designated place
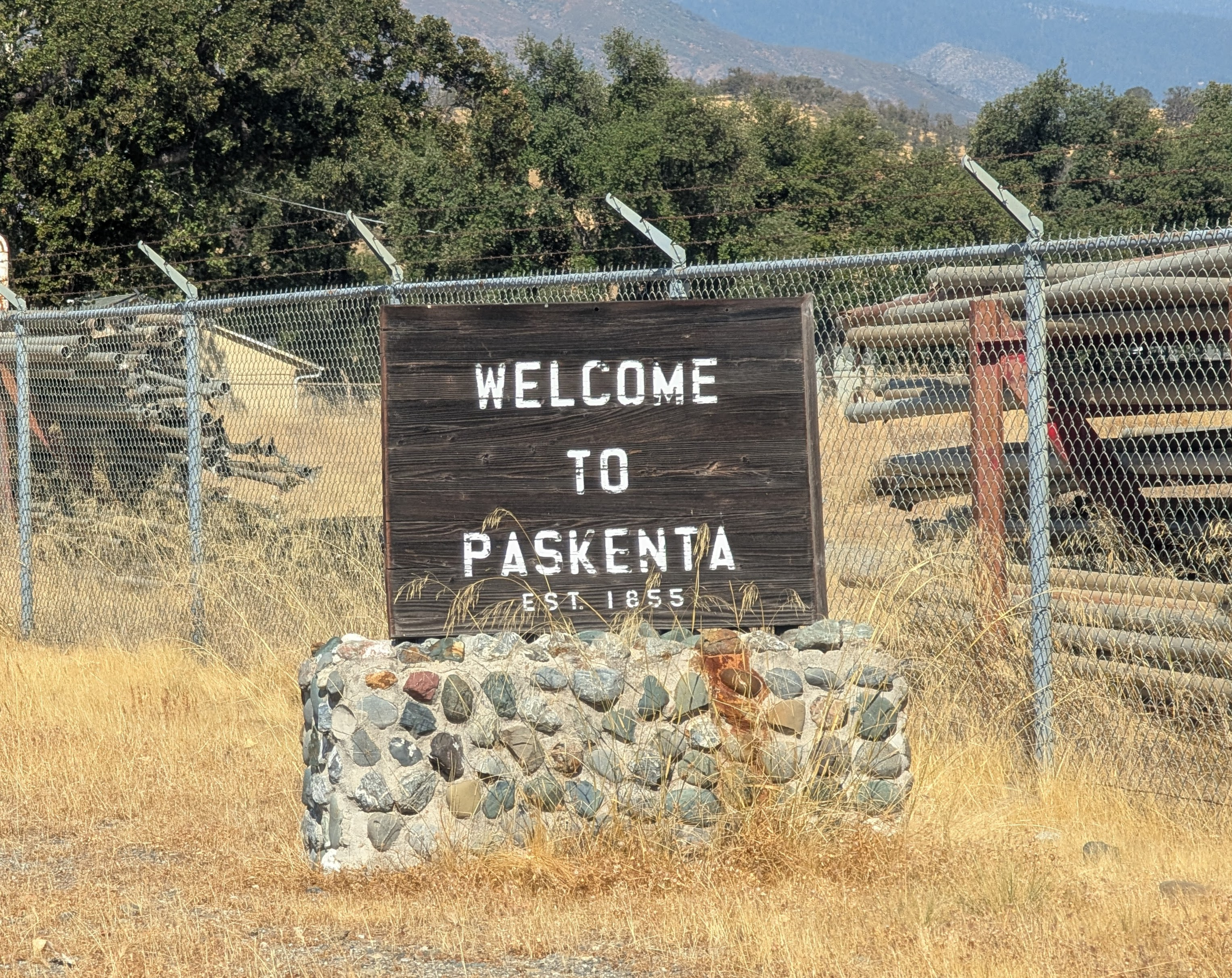
- Paskenta Welcome Sign

- Position in California.
- Coordinates: 39°52′59″N 122°32′37″W
- Country: United States
- State: California
- County: Tehama

Area
  - Total: 1.081 sq mi (2.799 km^{2})
  - Land: 1.081 sq mi (2.799 km^{2})
  - Water: 0 sq mi (0 km^{2}) 0%
- Elevation: 726 ft (221 m)

Population (2020)
  - Total: 110
  - Density: 100/sq mi (39/km^{2})
- Time zone: UTC-8 (Pacific (PST))
  - Summer (DST): UTC-7 (PDT)
- ZIP Code: 96074
- Area code: 530
- GNIS feature ID: 2628772

Paskenta (Wintun: Paskenti, meaning "under the hill") is a census-designated place (CDP) in Tehama County, California, United States. Historically, it had greater local importance due to the presence of an active lumber mill. The ZIP Code is 96074. The community is inside area code 530. Paskenta sits at an elevation of 725 feet (221 m). Paskenta was originally inhabited by a tribe of Nomlaki people who are now part of the federally-recognized Paskenta Band of Nomlaki Indians. The population was 110 as of the 2020 census.

== History ==
Paskenta was originally inhabited by a Nomlaki tribe. In the Nomlaki (Central Wintun) language, "Paskenta" (paskenti) means "under the hill" or "under the bank". The modern settlement was founded by Americans of European origin ca. 1860. A post office has been in operation there since 1872. The Paskenta Ranchería was established between 1906 and 1909 and is home to the Paskenta Band of Nomlaki Indians.

== Geography ==
According to the United States Census Bureau, the CDP covers an area of 1.1 square miles (2.8 km^{2}), all land.

== Demographics ==
Historical population
Census	Pop.	Note	%±
2010	114		—
2020	110		−3.5%
U.S. Decennial Census; 1860–1870 1880-1890; 1900 1910 1920; 1930 1940 1950; 1960 1970 1980; 1990 2000 2010

Paskenta first appeared as a census designated place in the 2010 U.S. census.

The 2020 United States Census reported that Paskenta CDP had a population of 110. The population density was 101.8 inhabitants per square mile (39.3/km^{2}). The racial makeup was 98 (89.1%) White, 2 (1.8%) African American, 2 (1.8%) Native American, 0 (0.0%) Asian, 0 (0.0%) Pacific Islander, 2 (1.8%) from other races, and 6 (5.5%) from two or more races. Hispanic or Latino of any race were 5 persons (4.5%).

The whole population lived in households. There were 44 households, out of which 11 (25.0%) had children under the age of 18 living in them, 16 (36.4%) were married-couple households, 2 (4.5%) were cohabiting couple households, 11 (25.0%) had a female householder with no partner present, and 15 (34.1%) had a male householder with no partner present. 16 households (36.4%) were one person, and 12 (27.3%) were one person aged 65 or older. The average household size was 2.50. There were 26 families (59.1% of all households).

The age distribution was 17 people (15.5%) under the age of 18, 10 people (9.1%) aged 18 to 24, 19 people (17.3%) aged 25 to 44, 40 people (36.4%) aged 45 to 64, and 24 people (21.8%) who were 65 years of age or older. The median age was 49.7 years. There were 42 males and 68 females.

There were 53 housing units at an average density of 49.0 units per square mile (18.9 units/km^{2}), of which 44 (83.0%) were occupied. Of these, 31 (70.5%) were owner-occupied, and 13 (29.5%) were occupied by renters.

== Politics ==
In the state legislature, Paskenta is in the 1st senatorial district, represented by Republican Megan Dahle, and in the 3rd Assembly district, represented by Vacant.

Federally, Paskenta is in California's 1st congressional district, represented by Republican James Gallagher.

== Education ==
Paskenta is served by Elkins Elementary School, which offers education from grades K-8. Further education takes place in Corning.

== See also ==
- Henleyville, California
