= Rancheria Tulea massacre =

1847 murder by American slave traders

The Rancheria Tulea massacre was an incident in March 1847 when American slave traders killed five Indians in retaliation for the escape of several enslaved Indians.

== History ==
=== Background ===
In 1839 John Sutter, a Swiss immigrant of German origin, settled in Alta California and began building a fortified settlement on a land grant of 48,827 acres at the confluence of the Sacramento and American rivers. He had been given the land by the Mexican government, supposedly under the stipulation that it would help to keep Americans from occupying the territory.

In order to build his fort and develop a large ranching/farming network in the area, Sutter relied on Indian labor. Observers accused him of using "kidnapping, food privation, and slavery" in order to force Indians to work for him, and generally stated that Sutter held the Indians under inhumane conditions. In 1846, the American James Clyman wrote that Sutter, "keeps 600 to 800 Indians in a complete state of Slavery." Sutter was one of many ranchers who took part in revenge attacks against Indians in response to cattle-stealing (see Kern and Sutter massacres).

Sutter was hospitable to foreign settlers looking to move into Alta California, especially Americans coming West. Soon the area was dotted with ranches, many of whom forced at least some Indians into slave labor in order to work their enormous holdings. Slavery became widespread in the region. Visitors to California described Indians as "legally reduced to servitude", "the bond-men of the country", "little better than serfs [who] performed all the drudgery and labour." White American Lansford Warren Hastings wrote "the natives...in California...are in a state of absolute vassalage, even more degrading, and more oppressive than that of our slaves in the south."

=== Incident ===
In March 1847, several Rancheria Tulea Indians escaped from slavery. According to a report Rancheria Tulea Indians made to government officials, the slavers attacked the Indians' home village in retaliation, killing five Indians and wounding "many more." A separate account from US marine lieutenant G.W. Harrison, made on the same day as the Rancheria Tulea Indians' report, stated that White Americans had "stormed" an Indian village and attempted to take the Indians there into slavery, killing four Indians in the process while losing one of their own. These two reports may refer to the same attack.

=== Repercussions ===
Despite the multiple reports to authorities, there is no record of any punitive action being taken against the slavers.

== Aftermath ==
Sutter eventually criticized the slave-stealing behavior of these other settlers, even though he had participated a level of it himself. A month after this incident, Sutter (now employed as a U.S. federal Indian agent) reported to his superiors that other slavers, "with little or no cause would shoot them, steal away their women and children, and even go so far as to attack whole villages, killing, without distinction of age or sex, hundreds of defenseless Indians."

The next month, more Indians would be killed in the Konkow Maidu slaver massacre.

On April 22, 1850, the fledgling California state legislature passed the "Act for the Government and Protection of Indians", legalizing the kidnapping and forced servitude of Indians by White settlers under certain conditions.

In 1851, the civilian governor of California declared, "That a war of extermination will continue to be waged, until the Indian race becomes extinct, must be expected." This expectation soon found its way into law. An 1851 legislative measure not only gave settlers the right to organize lynch mobs to kill Indians, but allowed them to submit their expenses to the government. By 1852 the state had authorized over a million dollars in such claims.

In 1856, a San Francisco Bulletin editorial stated, "Extermination is the quickest and cheapest remedy, and effectually prevents all other difficulties when an outbreak [of Indian violence] occurs." In 1860 the legislature passed a law expanding the age and condition of Indians available for forced slavery. A Sacramento Daily Union article of the time accused high-pressure lobbyists interested in profiting off enslaved Indians of pushing the law through, gave examples of how wealthy individuals had abused the law to acquire Indian slaves from the reservations, and stated, "The Act authorizes as complete a system of slavery, without any of the checks and wholesome restraints of slavery, as ever was devised."

On April 27, 1863, five months after Abraham Lincoln's Emancipation Proclamation, California outlawed the enslavement of Native Americans. However, slavery and forced labor continued under the name of "apprenticeship" and other euphemisms at least through 1874.

== See also ==
- Sacramento River massacre
- Sutter Buttes massacre
- Kern and Sutter massacres
- Konkow Maidu slaver massacre
- List of Indian massacres
- Forced labor in California
- Slave trade in the United States
