= Sutter Buttes Massacre =

The Sutter Buttes massacre refers to the murder of a group of Californian Indians on the Sacramento River near Sutter Buttes in June 1846 by a militarized expeditionary band led by Captain John C. Frémont of Virginia. At least 14 California Indians were killed in the massacre.

== History ==
=== Background ===
The expansionist movement of the 1840s motivated many Americans to work to push America's borders out into land claimed by Spain, Mexico, Britain, and Native American tribes. "Manifest Destiny", a term coined by journalist John L. O'Sullivan, captured the idea that the young American nation was destined to rule all of the North American continent.

Democratic Senator Thomas Hart Benton of Missouri was a prominent leader of this movement, into which he enlisted his son-in-law, John C. Frémont. Benton obtained government funding for several expeditions led by Frémont to map and explore the western territory.

In 1845, Captain Frémont was sent by the War Department on an expedition to survey the Great Basin and Alta California, a possession of Mexico. Upon arriving in California, Frémont and his men moved about the northern half of the state for several months, provoking the Mexican authorities and building up patriotic sentiment among Americans who had settled there. They briefly left the state in April 1846 under pressure from Mexican authorities, committing the Sacramento River massacre on their way out of the state and the Klamath Lake massacre after leaving it. A message from the American government implying war with Mexico was imminent led Frémont and his men to return to California in late May.

=== Incident ===
On 30 May 1846, the band arrived at the Sutter Buttes and set up camp there, planning to take Sutter Fort and raise the American flag. While encamped, Frémont heard rumors that local Indians were preparing an attack on settlers. He took movements of Indian groups and the upcoming harvest as "signs" that the time for the attack was nearing, and stated in his memoirs that he chose to attack them preemptively.

Frémont admits that his goal was to terrorize the Indians into submission and that he ordered his men to "leave no enemy behind." In the morning he and his armed men approached a rancheria near the location of modern-day Meridian, California. They attacked without warning and killed several Indians, though others escaped. Those killed were likely Patwin people of the Wintun. Frémont's band then proceeded to other rancherias and attempted to attack them as well, but word had spread and the Indians across the land were already fleeing.

=== Repercussions ===
Neither Frémont nor any of his expedition members were charged or punished in any way for the killings. Frémont claimed afterwards that his attack "put an end to the intended attack upon the whites" and that the Indians were kept on "good behavior" by fear of him.

== Aftermath ==
In July 1846, Frémont moved on to Sutter Fort and raised the American flag. By August 1846 American military officers had fully occupied the northern half of the state, and by December all of modern California was under American control. John C. Frémont became Military Governor of California in January 1847, but was forced to give up the position less than two months later under disputed circumstances. In 1850 Frémont became California's first U.S. Senator. Frémont, who had become wealthy off of gold mining claims, wrote a bill limiting gold mining claims to White citizens of the United States. In 1856 Frémont was nominated as the Republican candidate for president, losing the race to James Buchanan. He later fought as a Union general during the Civil War.

By the time Frémont had arrived in the Sacramento River Valley, wealthy landed settlers were beginning to depend on Indian labor in a sort of feudal system, with the Indians working both as free and as bonded labor. To some degree this saved the local Wintu from immediate annihilation, though the stealing of land, rape, and slave raids were common. By the 1850s, White American animosity at Indian possession of the land had built, and large-scale massacres involving hundreds of Wintu deaths commenced, including the Kabyai Creek massacre, the Old Shasta Town massacre and the Bridge Gulch massacre.

== See also ==
- Sacramento River massacre
- Klamath Lake massacre
- Kern and Sutter massacres
- List of Indian massacres
