= Liwaito, California =

Liwaito
- Former settlement
- Location in California
- Coordinates: 38°31′20″N 121°58′15″W
- Country: United States
- State: California
- County: Yolo
- Elevation: 135 ft (41 m)

Liwaito (also Lewytos and Liguaytoy) is a former settlement of the Patwin branch of the Wintun tribe in Yolo County, California, United States. The name means "waiving" in the Patwin language, and was also applied to Putah Creek. It lay at an elevation of 135 feet (41 m). Its location is quite near Winters, California.
