= Konkow Maidu slaver massacre =

The Konkow Maidu slaver massacre refers to an incident in 1847 when several settlers killed 12 to 20 Konkow Maidu in a slave raid near present-day Chico, California.

== History ==
=== Background ===
In 1839 John Sutter, a Swiss immigrant of German origin, settled in Alta California and began building a fortified settlement on a land grant of 48,827 acres (197.60 km^{2}) at the confluence of the Sacramento and American rivers. He had been given the land by the Mexican government, supposedly under the stipulation that it would help to keep Americans from occupying the territory.

In order to build his fort and develop a large ranching/farming network in the area, Sutter relied on Indian labor. Observers accused him of using "kidnapping, food privation, and slavery" in order to force Indians to work for him, and generally stated that Sutter held the Indians under inhumane conditions. In 1846, the American James Clyman wrote that Sutter, "keeps 600 to 800 Indians in a complete state of Slavery." Sutter was one of many ranchers who took part in revenge attacks against Indians in response to cattle-stealing (see Kern and Sutter massacres).

Sutter was hospitable to foreign settlers looking to move into Alta California, especially White Americans coming West. Soon the area was dotted with ranches, many of whom forced at least some Indians into slave labor in order to work their enormous holdings. Slavery became widespread in the region. Visitors to California described Indians as "legally reduced to servitude," "the bond-men of the country," "little better than serfs [who] performed all the drudgery and labour." White American Lansford Warren Hastings wrote "the natives...in California...are in a state of absolute vassalage, even more degrading, and more oppressive than that of our slaves in the south."

Sutter eventually criticized the slave-stealing behavior of these other settlers, even though he had participated a level of it himself. In 1847, Sutter (now employed as a U.S. federal Indian agent) reported to his superiors that other slavers, "with little or no cause would shoot them, steal away their women and children, and even go so far as to attack whole villages, killing, without distinction of age or sex, hundreds of defenseless Indians."

=== Incident ===
In late June or early July, several Spanish-speaking men met with friendly Konkow Maidu Indians about sixty miles north of Sutter's Fort near present-day Chico. Despite being received hospitably by the Konkow Maidu, the White men "after having partaken of their hospitality, commenced making prisoners of men, women and children, and in securing them, [shot ten to thirteen who tried] to escape." They then took into bondage at least thirty Indians, primarily women and children, killing on the way back those young children who were unable to continue.

=== Repercussions ===
J.A. Sutter reported that Antonio Armijo, Robert Smith, and John Eggar were the slavers who had massacred said Indians, and the men were then arrested by the U.S. Army. However, judges acquitted all three men at trial.

== Aftermath ==
This is the last record of the U.S. military government even taking any slavers of American Indians to trial or making any effort to stop slaving.

On April 22, 1850, the fledgling California state legislature passed the "Act for the Government and Protection of Indians," legalizing the kidnapping and forced servitude of Indians by White settlers. In 1851, the civilian governor of California declared, "That a war of extermination will continue to be waged…until the Indian race becomes extinct, must be expected." This expectation soon found its way into law. An 1851 legislative measure not only gave settlers the right to organize lynch mobs to kill Indians, but allowed them to submit their expenses to the government. By 1852 the state had authorized over a million dollars in such claims.

In 1856, a San Francisco Bulletin editorial stated, "Extermination is the quickest and cheapest remedy, and effectually prevents all other difficulties when an outbreak [of Indian violence] occurs." In 1860 the legislature passed a law expanding the age and condition of Indians available for forced slavery. A Sacramento Daily Union article of the time accused high-pressure lobbyists interested in profiting off enslaved Indians of pushing the law through, gave examples of how wealthy individuals had abused the law to acquire Indian slaves from the reservations, and stated, "The Act authorizes as complete a system of slavery, without any of the checks and wholesome restraints of slavery, as ever was devised."

On April 27, 1863, five months after Abraham Lincoln's Emancipation Proclamation, California outlawed the enslavement of Native Americans. However, slavery and forced labor continued under the name of "apprenticeship" and other euphemisms at least through 1874.

== See also ==
- Sacramento River massacre
- Sutter Buttes massacre
- Kern and Sutter massacres
- List of Indian massacres

== Bibliography ==
- Babe, E.J. (March 17, 1847). "E.J. Babe, Magistrate of Nappa, Northern District of California to Lieut Harrison Comndg Military forces at Sonoma". "Records of the 10th Military Department, 1846–51," Record Group 98. M210 (Reel 2). US National Archives and Records Administration.
- Bryant, Edwin (1848). What I Saw in California: Being the Journal of a Tour, by the Emigrant Route and South Pass of the Rocky Mountains, Across the Continent of North America, the Great Desert Basin, and through California, in the years 1846, 1847. New York: D. Appleton.
- Boggs, L.W. (October 30, 1847). "L.W. Boggs & M.G. Vallejo to Gov Mason". Archives of California. 63. State of California: 124.
- Buffum, E. Gould (1850). Six Months in the Gold Mines: From a Journal of Three Years' Residence in Upper and Lower California, 1847–1849. Philadelphia: Lee and Blanchard.
- "untitled article". California Star. July 24, 1847.
- Carranco, Lynwood; Beard, Estle (1981). Genocide and Vendetta, the Round Valley Wars of North California. Norman: University of Oklahoma.
- Clyman, James (1871). Diary of Col. James Clyman of Napa Co. Bancroft Library.
- Comptroller of the State of California (1851–1859). Expenditures for Military Expeditions against Indians, 1851-1859. Sacramento: The Comptroller.
- Harrison, Geo (March 17, 1847). "Geo Harrison to Capt. DuPont". "Records of the 10th Military Department, 1846–51," Record Group 98. M210 (Reel 2). US National Archives and Records Administration.
- Hastings, Lansford Warren (1845). The Emigrants' Guide, to Oregon and California... and all Necessary Information Relative to the Equipment, Supplies, and the Method of Traveling. Cincinnati: George Conclin.
- Hurtado, Albert (1988). Indian Survival on the California Frontier. New Haven.
- Hurtado, Albert (Spring 1990). "California Indians and the Workaday West: Labor, Assimilation, and Survival". California History. 69 (1): 5. doi:10.2307/25177303. JSTOR 25177303.
- Journals of the Legislature of the State of California at its Second Session. San Jose. 1851.
- Murray, Walter (1878). Narrative of a California Volunteer. Bancroft Library.
- Madley, Benjamin (2009). An American Genocide: The United States and the California Indian Catastrophe, 1846-1873 (The Lamar Series in Western History). Yale University Press.
- "untitled article". Sacramento Union. August 22, 1856.
- "untitled article". San Francisco Bulletin. September 1, 1856.
- Smith, Stacey L. (April 29, 2013). "Freedom for California Indians". The New York Times.
- California Legislature (1860). Statutes of California, Assembly Bill 65. San Jose.
- Street, Richard Steven (2004). Beasts of the Field: A Narrative History of California Farmworkers, 1769-1913. Stanford University Press.
- Sutter, John (May 18, 1847a). "Jn. A. Sutter to Gen. S.W. Kearney". Archives of California. 63. State of California: 86.
- Sutter, John (July 12, 1847b). "J. A. Sutter, Sub-agent for the Indians on the Sacramento and San Joaquin rivers to R.B. Mason, Colonel 1st Dragoons, Governor, Commander-in-Chief of the land forces in California". S. Exec. Doc. 18, 31st Cong., 1st Sess., 1850, Serial 557, 351. US National Archives and Records Administration.
- "John Sutter and California's Indians". Wild West Magazine. December 12, 2006. Archived from the original on 2017-08-28 – via Historynet.com.
- California Legislature (1850). Statutes of California, Passed at the First Session of the Legislature. San Jose.
- "untitled article". Sacramento Daily Union. February 4, 1861.
