= Lolsel, California =

Former indigenous settlement in California

Lolsel (also, Lol-sel, Lold-la, and Loldlas) is a former Wintun settlement in Lake County, California, United States. It was located east of Clear Lake in Long Valley; its precise location is unknown. The name Lol-sel means "tobacco people", for the residents of the area that was called Lold-la, "tobacco place". The Lolsel village numbered about one hundred people in the nineteenth century.
