= Klamath Lake massacre =

1846 murder of the Native People of Oregon

Coordinates: 42.4942°N 121.9444°W

The Klamath Lake massacre refers to the murder of at least fourteen Klamath people on the shores of Klamath Lake in modern-day Oregon, United States, on May 12, 1846, by a group led by John C. Frémont and Kit Carson.

== History ==
=== Background ===
The Expansionist Movement of the 1840s motivated many Americans to work to push America's borders out into land claimed by Mexico and Native American tribes. "Manifest Destiny", a term coined by journalist John L. O'Sullivan, captured the idea that the young American nation was destined to rule all of the North American continent.

Democratic Senator Thomas Hart Benton of Missouri was a prominent leader of this movement, into which he enlisted his son-in-law, John C. Frémont. Benton obtained government funding for several expeditions led by Frémont to map and explore the western territory.

In 1845, Captain Frémont was sent by the War Department on an expedition to survey the Great Basin and Alta California, a possession of Mexico. Upon arriving in California, Frémont and his men moved about the northern half of the state for several months, provoking the Mexican authorities and building up patriotic sentiment among Americans who had settled there. On April 5, 1846, Frémont and his men committed the Sacramento River massacre on its banks near present-day Redding, California. They then proceeded north up the Sacramento River Valley and into Oregon Territory.

=== Incident ===
Frémont and his band had taken to killing Native Americans on sight as they traveled. In his memoirs, expedition member Thomas S. Martin stated, "We followed up the Sacramento River killing plenty of game, and an occasional Indian. Of the latter we made it a rule to spare none of the bucks." Expedition member Thomas E. Breckenridge said that the men "had orders while in camp or on the move to shoot Indians on sight. While on the march the crack of a rifle and the dying yell of a native was not an unusual occurrence."

On the night of May 9, 1846, a band of 15–20 Klamath natives retaliated and attacked Frémont's group under cover of darkness, killing 2–3 members of the party. Frémont was "determined to square accounts with these people." His scouts killed two Klamath warriors on 11 May 1846, but Frémont considered that inadequate.

On May 12, 1846, Frémont's assistant Kit Carson led an assault on a Klamath village named Dokdokwas on the shores of Klamath Lake. The assailants destroyed the village and killed at least 14 villagers without taking a single casualty themselves.

=== Repercussions ===
Neither Frémont nor any of his expedition members were charged or punished in any way for the killings. The U.S. government ordered Frémont back to California to participate in the war against Mexico, and he did not return to Oregon territory.

== Aftermath ==
John C. Frémont and his band continued to kill Native Americans on sight on the way back down to California and committed a "preemptive" attack on a rancheria, known as the Sutter Buttes massacre. Frémont became Military Governor of California in January 1847, but was forced to resign less than two months later. In 1850, Frémont became California's first U.S. Senator. In 1856, Frémont was nominated as the Republican candidate for president, losing the race to James Buchanan. He later fought as a Union general during the Civil War.

The Klamath people continued to be subject to violence from White settlers, including a long string of similar massacres and attacks. By 1855, the Humboldt Times reported that miners were "determined to commence an indiscriminate massacre of all the Indians" in the Klamath watershed, while the Sacramento Daily Union reported that "people look upon it there as a war of extermination and are killing all grown up males." Judge Fletcher of Klamath County stated of fleeing natives that "whites are hunting them down like deer."

In 1864, the Klamath people were forced to give up claims to twenty million of the twenty-two million acres they had lived on, with the remaining two million acres forming the Klamath Reservation. They became financially self-sufficient on this land due to a profitable timber mill, cattle ranching, and other enterprises. In 1954 an Act of Congress terminated the tribal status of the Klamath, forcing them to give up their claim to the land and lose all federal services in exchange for a monetary payoff. In 1986 their tribal status was restored, but their land was not returned.

== See also ==
- Sacramento River massacre
- List of Indian massacres
