= Hoosimbim Mountain =

Mountain in California, United States of America

- Location within California

Highest point
- Elevation: 5,364 ft (1,635 m) NAVD 88
- Coordinates: 40°33′49″N 122°59′54″W

Geography
- Location: Trinity County, California, U.S.
- Topo map: USGS Hoosimbim Mountain

Hoosimbim Mountain is a summit in Trinity County, California, in the United States. With an elevation of 5,364 feet (1,635 m), Hoosimbim Mountain is the 2323rd highest summit in the state of California.

Hoosimbim is derived from a Wintu-language phrase meaning "buzzard's water".
