= Thomes Creek =

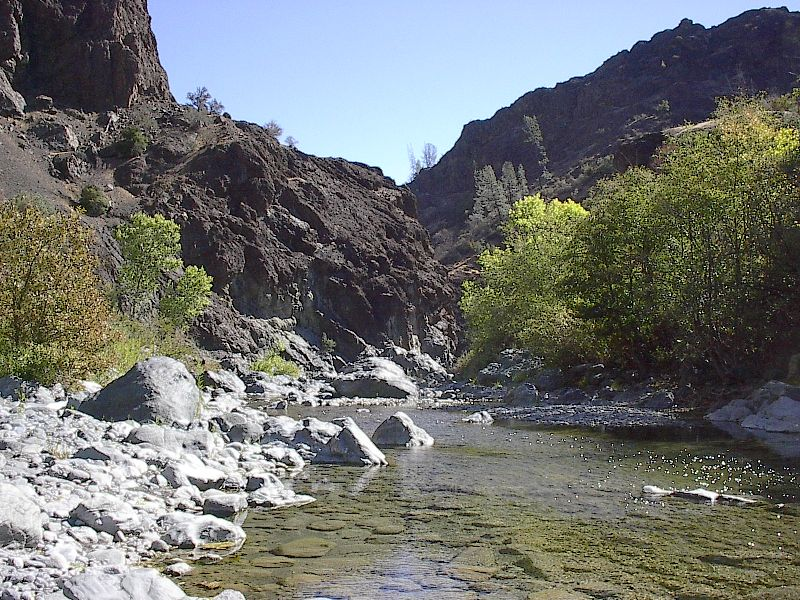
- Thomes Creek near The Gorge

- Location of mouth of Thomes Creek in California

Location
- Country: United States
- State: California

Physical characteristics
- Source
  - location: Mendocino National Forest, Tehama County
  - coordinates: 40°02′00″N 122°56′30″W
  - elevation: 6,460 ft (1,970 m)
- Mouth: Sacramento River
  - location: near Tehama, Tehama County
  - coordinates: 39°59′26″N 122°05′46″W
  - elevation: 184 ft (56 m)
- Length: 62 mi (100 km)
- Basin size: 300 sq mi (780 km^{2})
- Discharge
  - location: Paskenta
  - average: 295.4 cu ft/s (8.36 m^{3}/s)
  - minimum: 0 cu ft/s (0 m^{3}/s)
  - maximum: 37,800 cu ft/s (1,070 m^{3}/s)

Thomes Creek is a major watercourse on the west side of the Sacramento Valley in Northern California. The creek originates in the Coast Ranges and flows east for about 62 miles (100 km) to join the Sacramento River, at a point about 7 miles (11 km) northeast of Corning in Tehama County.

Thomes Creek is a highly seasonal stream and drains a mostly rural watershed of some 300 square miles (780 km^{2}). There are no permanent dams on the creek, although there are some small diversions for agriculture and domestic water supply, and the overall water quality is considered good. The upper 22 miles (35 km) of Thomes Creek are rated Class IV–V+ ("very difficult") for whitewater kayaking and rafting.

== Name origin ==
Thomes Creek was named after Robert Hasty Thomes, a pioneer who arrived to the area in the 1840s. Thomes' name has been frequently mispronounced and misspelled, resulting in many officially-recorded variant names such as "Thomas Creek", "Thoms Creek" and "Toms Creek".

== Geography ==
Thomes Creek begins at Kingsley Lake, a small pond at elevation 6,460 feet (1,970 m) in the Mendocino National Forest. The lake is in a saddle between Solomon Peak, 7,566 feet (2,306 m) and Sugarloaf Mountain, 7,362 feet (2,244 m) near the Tehama-Trinity County line. The creek flows south through a deep valley for about 10 miles (16 km) and turns east at the confluence with Willow Creek. It passes through the narrow Thomes Gorge, also known simply as "The Gorge", and emerges from the mountains near Paskenta. From there it flows east-northeast through the semi-arid foothills of the Coast Ranges past Henleyville, Richfield and Tehama to join the Sacramento River at river mile 226 (km 364).

The upper watershed is rugged, mountainous and highly prone to flooding and landslides. The highest point in the watershed is the summit of Mount Linn (South Yolla Bolly Mountain) at 8,081 feet (2,463 m) in the Yolla Bolly-Middle Eel Wilderness. The lower part of the creek flows over a wide cobbled alluvial bed composed of coarse gravel and large boulders. Due to the seasonal nature of precipitation in this area, the lower part of Thomes Creek is often dry during the summer. The watershed receives most of its precipitation in the form of rain, though snow falls frequently at elevations above 5,000 feet (1,500 m). The average precipitation in the lowlands is 20 inches (510 mm), while in the mountains it can be as high as 70 to 80 inches (1,800 to 2,000 mm).

Water quality in Thomes Creek is considered good although it has been impacted by high rates of erosion, caused in part by the unstable sedimentary rock that makes up much of the Coast Ranges, but also from human activities such as ranching, logging, agriculture and mining.

=== Discharge ===
A U.S. Geological Survey stream gage at Paskenta measured the discharge of Thomes Creek between October 1920 and September 1996. The average annual flow was 295.4 cubic feet per second (8.36 m^{3}/s), with a monthly average ranging from 706 cubic feet per second (20.0 m^{3}/s) in February to 5.1 cubic feet per second (0.14 m^{3}/s) in October. The highest recorded flow was 37,800 cubic feet per second (1,070 m^{3}/s) on December 22, 1964 during the Christmas flood of 1964.

== Ecology ==
The creek provides habitat for as many as 22 fish species according to a 1982 study, including Sacramento pikeminnow, Sacramento sucker, hardhead, California roach and speckled dace. The creek is host to significant runs of steelhead trout, as well as resident populations of rainbow trout (landlocked steelhead) above the waterfalls in the Gorge which form partial barriers to fish passage. The creek is also home to spring-run chinook salmon.

== See also ==
- List of rivers of California
