= Wintu =

Native American tribe in California

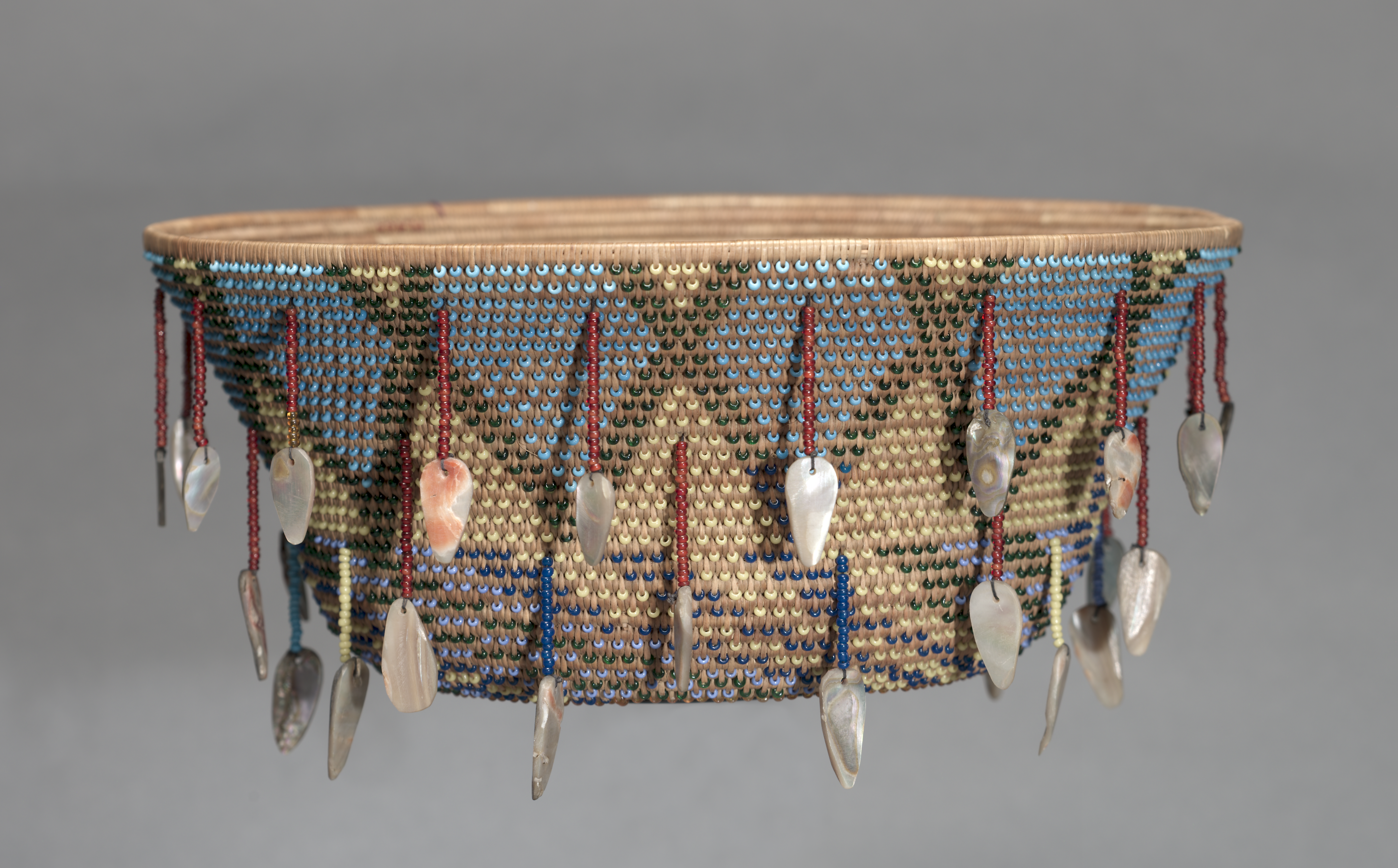
- Wintu basket, c. 1890s, Cleveland Museum of Art

Total population
- 2,500 (three major groups)

Regions with significant populations
- United States Northern Sacramento Valley, California

Languages
- English, formerly Wintu

Religion
- Christianity, Native religion

Related ethnic groups
- Wintun (Nomlaki and Patwin), Yokuts

- Person: Wintʰu
- People: Wintʰun
- Language: Wintʰuh
- Country: Wintʰu Pom

The Wintu (also Northern Wintun) are a Native American people from what is now Northern California. They are part of a loose association of peoples known collectively as the Wintun (or Wintuan), together with the Nomlaki (Central Wintun), and the Patwin (Southern Wintun). The Wintu language is part of the Wintuan language family.

Historically, the Wintu lived primarily on the western side of the northern part of the Sacramento Valley, from the Sacramento River to the Coast Range. The range of the Northern Wintu also included the southern portions of the Upper Sacramento River (south of the Salt Creek drainage), the southern portion of the McCloud River, and the upper Trinity River. Today, many Northern Wintu still reside on or near their traditional homelands in Trinity and Shasta counties.

== History ==
The first recorded encounter between Wintu and Euro-Americans dates from the 1826 expedition of Jedediah Smith, followed by an 1827 expedition led by Peter Skene Ogden. Between 1830 and 1833, many Wintu died from a malaria epidemic that killed an estimated 75% of the Indigenous people in the upper and central Sacramento Valley.

Euro-American settlers, seeking to acquire Wintu land, proposed relocating the Wintu west of Clear Creek in exchange for peace, money, and citizenship. When Wintu communities refused or resisted these terms, settlers responded with enslavement, violence, and war. In 1846, John C. Frémont and Kit Carson, accompanied by local white settlers, killed several hundred Wintu in the Sacramento River massacre. At a "friendship feast" in 1850, settlers served poisoned food to local Native people, from which 100 Nomsuu and 45 Wenemem Wintu died. More deaths of Wintu and destruction of their land followed in 1851 and 1852, including the Bridge Gulch Massacre. The increasing population of settlers moving west during the California Gold Rush intensified pressure on Indigenous nations, including the Wintu, as settlers and state forces systematically displaced and destroyed Native communities.

== Culture ==
The number of bands within the Northern Wintu is debated among tribal members and anthropologists, but most recognize 8 to 11 bands: Daupom/Stillwater, El pom/Keswick, Nomtipom/Upper Sacramento River, Winnemem/McCloud River, Nomsus/Upper Trinity River, Klabalpom/French Gulch, Daumuq/Cottonwood Creek, Norelmuq/Hayfork, Puimem/Lower Pit River, Daunom/Bald Hills, and Waymuq/Mt. Shasta. The Waymuq form a transitional group in culture, language, and society between Wintu-speaking peoples and Shastan-speakers. Some anthropologists and linguists have called the same group the Okwanuchu (from the Shasta word for "distant people"). The Waymuq lived north of Salt and Nosoni Creek, extending to the southern base of Mt. Shasta, with major villages in what is now Dunsmuir, Mt. Shasta City (formerly Sisson), and along Sulanharas Creek. The anthropologist C. Hart Merriam also noted a Northern Wintu group along the South Fork of the Trinity River under the Athabaskan name "Ni-i-che." This group was culturally and linguistically close to the Norelmuq, though it is unclear whether they were a separate band.

The Wintu have close ties to the natural resources of their region. The Winnemem Wintu call themselves "Middle Water people" in their language. They say they were born from water, are the water, and fight to protect it. Hunting, fishing, and gathering remain central to their culture. They have their own customs, traditional art, and spiritual beliefs. When villages had extra food, they sometimes invited neighboring tribes to feast, dance, and play games. Dance served many purposes beyond entertainment—for example, the suneh, or begging dance, was performed when one person transferred property to another.

Wintu homes were small and semi-permanent, built along waterways. The River and Hill Patwin built dome‑shaped homes—the River Patwin using sticks, straw, and other local materials, the Hill Patwin using conical bark. Larger communities had an earth lodge used as a sweat lodge for spiritual renewal, purification, and connection to nature; unmarried men without families also slept there.

Fishing has always been central to Wintu life. Salmon from the McCloud and Sacramento rivers was the primary food source, along with Steelhead trout from the upper Trinity River. Men hunted individually or in groups, using traps for many kinds of animals. Women gathered plants for food and for making implements such as baskets. Basket weaving was a major part of Wintu culture: baskets for cooking, storing, sifting, and carrying, as well as woven hats that many women wore.

=== Cuisine ===
The Wintu engaged in deer hunting. Brown bears were pursued during the fall season when they were well-fed and lethargic. Additionally, the Wintu consumed various meats, including rabbits, gophers, squirrels, wood rats, quail, and other avian species. Grasshoppers were prepared by boiling them in baskets and subsequently drying them in the sun. Salmon flour held significant value in trade. Acorns constituted the primary plant-based food for the Wintu, similar to many early Californians, including the Wintu. Manzanita berries were utilized in the preparation of soup and cider. Other edible plants included soaproot, clover, miner's lettuce, skunkbush berries, hazelnuts, pine nuts, wild grapes, as well as sunflower and cotton flower seeds.

== Population ==
Scholars have disagreed about the historical population of the tribes before European-American contact. Due to competition for resources, forced labor, disease, and other factors, the Wintu tribes' population decreased. Alfred L. Kroeber estimated the combined 1770 population of the Wintu, Nomlaki, and Patwin as 12,000. Sherburne F. Cook initially put the population of the Wintu proper as 2,950, but later nearly doubled his estimate to 5,300. Frank R. LaPena estimated a total of 14,250 in his work of the 1970s.

Kroeber estimated the population of the Wintu, Nomlaki, and Patwin in 1910 as about 1,000. Today the population has recovered somewhat and there are about 2,500 Wintun, many of whom live on the Round Valley Reservation, and on the Colusa, Cortina, Grindstone Creek, Redding, and Rumsey rancherias. The estimated total of Wintu people is averaged at 2,500.

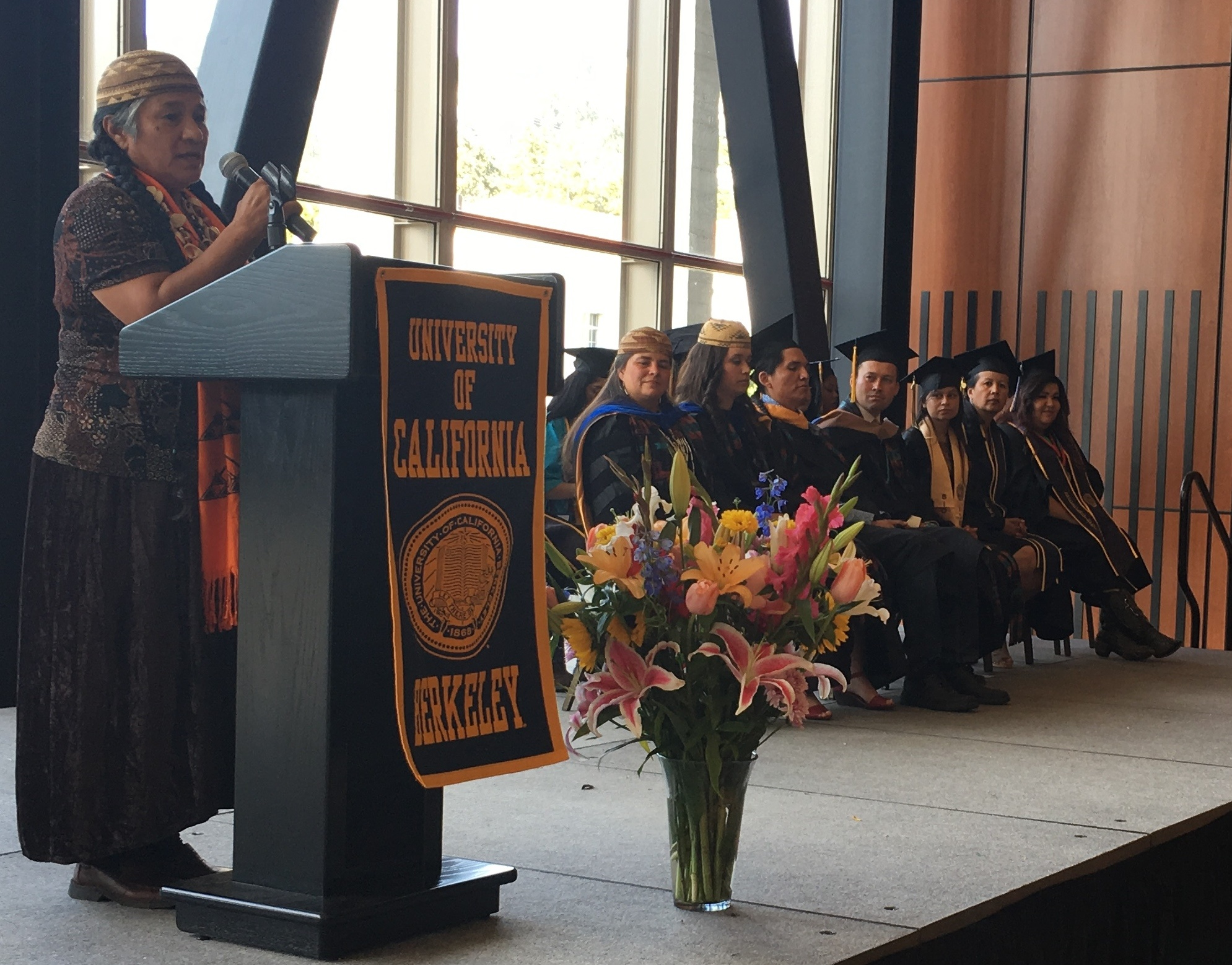
Caleen Sisk, Chief and Spiritual Leader of the Winnemem Wintu Tribe

== Present day ==
The Wintu tribes had to modernize their way of life while keeping their culture and history with them. They explain that their mission is to preserve, promote and protect the culture of the tribe, creating long-term economic prosperity and self-reliance. Current tribal council members consist of Gary and Theresa Rickard, Vincent Cervantes, Gene Malone, Cindy Hogue, Bill Hunt, and Les Begly. They have a Museum and Cultural Resource Center that was built after they lost their recognition status by the federal government.

In 1941, Congress passed the Central Valley Project Indian Lands Acquisition Act. This led to the Wintu tribe losing access to the Upper Sacramento River, McCloud River, and Lower Pit River. To the Wintu people, these parts of the land are sacred. By losing the river they also lost their prime source of food, salmon. In 2023, the Wintu were able to buy back the land where the rivers lie. They told reporters and writers that they plan to restore the winter-run Chinook salmon population.

In February 2025, they, along with the Paskenta Band of Nomlaki Indians, put a claim in federal court against the US Department of the Interior, arguing that a proposed site for a casino was the same place where the Sacramento River Massacre took place.

== See also ==
- Winnemem Wintu
