= Kern and Sutter massacres =

1847 series of Indian massacres in California, U.S.

On March 23, 1847, men led by Captain Edward M. Kern and rancher John Sutter killed twenty California Indians in a series of massacres.

== History ==
=== Background ===
In 1839, John Sutter, a Swiss immigrant of German origin, settled in Alta California and began building a fortified settlement on a land grant of 48,827 acres where the Sacramento and American Rivers meet. This establishment, known as Sutter's Fort, was where the first traces of gold were found, initiating the California Gold Rush. The fort was a trading post for traveling pioneers, trappers, and men looking for work. He had been given the land by the Mexican government, supposedly under the stipulation that it would help to keep Americans from occupying the territory.

To build his fort and develop an extensive ranching/farming network in the area, Sutter relied on Indian labor. Observers accused him of using "kidnapping, food privation, and slavery" to force Indians to work for him and generally stated that Sutter held the Indians under inhumane conditions. If Indians refused to work for him, Sutter responded with violence. Theodor Cordua, a German immigrant who leased land from Sutter, wrote:

When Sutter established himself in 1839 in the Sacramento Valley, new misfortune came upon these peaceful natives of the country. Their services were demanded immediately. Those who did not want to work were considered as enemies. With other tribes the field was taken against the hostile Indian. Declaration of war was not made. The villages were attacked usually before daybreak when everybody was still asleep. Neither old nor young was spared by the enemy, and often the Sacramento River was colored red by the blood of the innocent Indians, for these villages usually were situated at the banks of the rivers. During a campaign one section of the attackers fell upon the village by way of land. All the Indians of the attacked village naturally fled to find protection on the other bank of the river. But there they were awaited by the other half of the enemy and thus the unhappy people were shot and killed with rifles from both sides of the river. Seldom an Indian escaped such an attack, and those who were not murdered were captured. All children from six to fifteen years of age were usually taken by the greedy white people. The village was burned down and the few Indians who had escaped with their lives were left to their fate.

In 1846, the American James Clyman wrote that Sutter "keeps 600 to 800 Indians in a complete state of Slavery."

Despite his promises to the Mexican government, Sutter was hospitable to American settlers entering the region and encouraged many of them to settle there. The hundreds of thousands of acres these men took from the Native Americans had been an important source of food and resources. As the White settlers were ranching two million heads of livestock, shooting wild game in enormous numbers, and replacing wilderness with wheat fields, available food for Indians in the region diminished. In response, some Indians took to raiding the cattle of White ranchers. In August 1846, an article in The Californian declared that concerning California Indians, "The only effectual means of stopping inroads upon the property of the country, will be to attack them in their villages."

=== Incident ===
On February 28, 1847, sixteen Mill Creek men petitioned US Army captain Edward Kern for assistance against local Indians so that they would not "be forced to abandon our farms and leave our property perhaps something worse." Captain Kern quickly marched up the valley with twenty men to "chastise" the Indians. There he met up with Sutter, who had assembled thirty men from among the local White settlers.

On March 23, 1847, Captain Kern and Sutter took these men into the upper Sacramento Valley. From there, the men led three separate attacks in which twenty Indians were killed, while Kern and Sutter did not lose a single man. A contemporary newspaper account noted that Kern had Indian soldiers under his command on this endeavor and that they fought bravely and were considered the most efficient men employed in frontier service.

=== Repercussions ===
None of the men faced any repercussions for their actions. Captain Kern claimed in a letter to Commander Joseph B. Hull that his attacks had convinced the Indians to stop taking cattle stock from the Americans.

== Aftermath ==
On April 22, 1850, the fledgling California state legislature passed the "Act for the Government and Protection of Indians," legalizing the kidnapping and forced servitude of Indians by White settlers. In 1851, the civilian governor of California declared, "That a war of extermination will continue to be waged ... until the Indian race becomes extinct, must be expected." This expectation soon found its way into law. An 1851 legislative measure not only gave settlers the right to organize lynch mobs to kill Indians but also allowed them to submit their expenses to the government. By 1852 the state had authorized over a million dollars in such claims.

In 1856, a San Francisco Bulletin editorial stated, "Extermination is the quickest and cheapest remedy, and effectually prevents all other difficulties when an outbreak [of Indian violence] occurs." In 1860, the legislature passed a law expanding the age and condition of Indians available for forced slavery. A Sacramento Daily Union article of the time accused high-pressure lobbyists interested in profiting off enslaved Indians of pushing the law through, gave examples of how wealthy individuals had abused the law to acquire enslaved Indians from the reservations, and stated, "The Act authorizes as complete a system of slavery, without any of the checks and wholesome restraints of slavery, as ever was devised."

On April 27, 1863, five months after President Abraham Lincoln's Emancipation Proclamation, California outlawed the enslavement of Native Americans. However, slavery and forced labor continued under "apprenticeship" and other euphemisms until 1874.

== See also ==
- Sacramento River massacre
- Sutter Buttes massacre
- Rancheria Tulea massacre
- Konkow Maidu slaver massacre
- List of Indian massacres
- Bibliography of California history
