= Wintu-Nomlaki traditional narratives =

Wintu-Nomlaki traditional narratives include myths, legends, tales, and oral histories preserved by the Wintu and Nomlaki people of the western Sacramento Valley in northern California.

Winto-Nomalki oral literature is in many respects typical of central California, but it also reflects influences from Northwest Coast, Plateau, and Great Basin regions. (See also Traditional narratives (Native California).)

== Mythology of Yuki, Pomo, Wintun and others ==
- The North American Indian by Edward S. Curtis (1924)

== Sources ==
- Curtin, Jeremiah. 1898. Creation Myths of Primitive America in Relation to the Religious History and Mental Development of Mankind. Little, Brown, Boston. (Reprinted in 1995 as "Creation Myths of America.") (Nine Wintun myths, with commentaries.)
- Curtis, Edward S. 1907–1930. The North American Indian. 20 vols. Plimpton Press, Norwood, Massachusetts. (Wintu creation myth collected from Tommy Neal, vol. 14, p. 173.)
- Demetracopoulou, Dorothy, and Cora A. DuBois. 1932. "A Study in Wintu Mythology". Journal of American Folklore 45:375-500. (69 texts, including multiple versions, collected in 1929–1930.)
- DuBois, Cora A. 1935. "Wintu Ethnography". University of California Publications in American Archaeology and Ethnology 36:1-148. Berkeley. (Information on mythology and beliefs, pp. 72–88.)
- DuBois, Cora A., and Dorothy Demetracopoulou. 1931. "Wintu Myths". University of California Publications in American Archaeology and Ethnology 28:279-402. Berkeley. (Myths, including Earth Diver, Theft of Fire, Loon Woman, and Bear and Fawns, collected in 1929.)
- Erdoes, Richard, and Alfonso Ortiz. 1984. American Indian Myths and Legends. Pantheon Books, New York. (Retelling of a narrative from DuBois and Demetracopoulou 1931, pp. 209–211.)
- Goldschmidt, Walter. 1951. "Nomlaki Ethnography". University of California Publications in American Archaeology and Ethnology 42:303-443. Berkeley. (Myths, including Theft of Fire, pp. 349–351, 390–400.)
- Goldschmidt, Walter, George Foster, and Frank Essene. 1939. "War Stories from Two Enemy Tribes". Journal of American Folklore 52:141-154. (Reprinted in The California Indians: A Source Book, edited by R. F. Heizer and M. A. Whipple, pp. 445–458, 2nd ed., 1971, University of California Press, Berkeley. (Five Nomlaki accounts of warfare with the Yuki, compared with Yuki accounts; collected in 1935–1937, referring in some cases to events less than a century old.)
- Kroeber, A. L. 1932. "The Patwin and their Neighbors". University of California Publications in American Archaeology and Ethnology 29:253-423. Berkeley. (Wintu/Nomlaki war stories, p. 303.)
- Kroeber, A. L. 1925. Handbook of the Indians of California. Bureau of American Ethnology Bulletin No. 78. Washington, D.C. (Brief note, p. 362.)
- Kroeber, Theodora. 1959. The Inland Whale. University of California Press. (Retelling of one traditional narrative with commentary, pp. 77–84, 178–183.)
- Luthin, Herbert W. 2002. Surviving through the Days: A California Indian Reader. University of California Press, Berkeley. (Retranslation of myth previously published in DuBois and Demetracopoulou 1931 and in Demetracopoulou 1935, pp. 192–218.)
- Margolin, Malcolm. 1993. The Way We Lived: California Indian Stories, Songs, and Reminiscences. First edition 1981. Heyday Books, Berkeley, California. (Four myths, pp. 22–24, 35–38, 129–130, 154–155, from DuBois and Demetracopoulou 1931.)
- Masson, Marcelle. 1966. A Bag of Bones: The Wintu Myths of a Trinity River Indian. Naturegraph, Healdsburg, California.
- McKibbin, Grace, and Alice Shepherd. 1997. In My Own Words: Stories, Songs, and Memories of Grace McKibbin, Wintu. Heyday Books, Berkeley, California.
- Pitkin, Harvey. 1978. "Squirrel and Acorn-Woman (Wintu)". In Coyote Stories, edited by William Bright, pp. 32–44. International Journal of American Linguistics Native American Texts Series No. 1. University of Chicago Press. (Narrated by Carrie B. Dixon in 1957.)
- Schlichter, Alice. 1978. "Coyote and Badger (Wintu)". In Coyote Stories, edited by William Bright, pp. 45–50. International Journal of American Linguistics Native American Texts Series No. 1. University of Chicago Press. (Narrated by Grace MacKibben in 1977.)
- Schlichter, Alice. 1980. "Coyote and the 'Cricket' (Wintu)". In Coyote Stories II, edited by Martha B. Kendall, pp. 71–80. International Journal of American Linguistics Native American Texts Series 6. University of Chicago Press.
- Shepherd, Alice. 1989. Wintu Texts. University of California Publications in Linguistics No. 117. Berkeley. (Narratives, including Theft of Fire and Bear and Fawns, collected from Grace McKibben and Carrie B. Dixon in 1975–1982.)
