= Paskenta Band of Nomlaki Indians =

Federally recognized tribe of Nomlaki people

Coordinates: 39.868099°N 122.2245035°W

Paskenta Band of Nomlaki Indians Nomlāqa Bōda
Regions with significant populations
- United States (California)

Languages
- English, Nomlaki

Religion
- traditional tribal religion, Christianity

Related ethnic groups
- other Wintu people, and Patwin

Paskenta Chairman Andrew Alejandre discusses tribal relationships with the State of California in 2019.

The Paskenta Band of Nomlaki Indians, or in their own language Nomlāqa Bōda, is a federally recognized tribe of Nomlaki people. The Nomlaki are Central Wintun, or River and Hill Nomlaki, an Indigenous people of California, located in Tehama and Glenn counties.

== The Tribe ==
The Paskenta Band of Nomlaki Indians has approximately 240 members. The Tribe is governed by the Tribal Council, which is composed of the tribal chairperson, vice-chairperson, treasurer, secretary and member at large. These five members are elected by the General Council.

== History ==
Location of Paskenta Rancheria

There were two major divisions of Nomlaki Indians in California: the Hill Nomlaki and the River Nomlaki. The Paskenta Nomlaki are the Hill Nomlaki, occupying the territory east of the Coastal Range now known as Tehama and Glenn counties.

Nomlaki tribes lived in villages under the leadership of a chieftain. These villages had a population of 25 to 200 people. The chief's house was larger than the others and formed the center of the village, facing the water source. In addition to serving as the chief's residence, it was the men's house and focal point of village life. Other houses in the village were constructed from bent saplings with vine and thatch; they faced the chief's house.

The Nomlaki's primary foods were acorns, grass seeds and tubers, deer, elk, rabbits, birds, and fish. All men hunted, but some specialized in certain techniques and methods. Hunting was done both in groups and individually with bows and arrows, clubs, nets, snares, and traps. Women, often working groups, gathered many different seeds and tubers, including at least eight varieties of acorns. In the spring, salt was obtained from stream banks.

The Paskenta Rancheria was created, along with other Wintu Rancherias, in 1906 and 1909. In 1920, the rancheria was 260-acres. In 1959, the rancheria was terminated under the California Rancheria Termination Act, and the lands were sold to non-Native peoples. Despite the denial of federally recognized tribal status, the Paskenta Band maintained its tribal identity and culture while it worked for restoration as a Native American tribe. Finally in 1994, the federal government restored the Paskenta Band of Nomlaki Indians to full tribal status. The current rancheria is 2000-acres large.

The Paskenta Band is headquartered in Corning, California. The current tribal chairperson is Andrew "Dru" Alejandre, who succeeds Andy Freeman and Everett Freeman, who was instrumental in the tribal regaining their tribal recognition.

== Programs ==
The Tribe established the Rolling Hills Community Development Foundation, which supports local groups in their efforts to improve and develop the North State. The Foundation funds programs with the end goal of higher education, education related activities that better the economic landscape of local counties, and activities that further the goals of improving the quality of life for local residents and surrounding communities.

== Economic development ==
The tribe owns and operates the Rolling Hills Casino, in Corning, California located of I-5. The Casino offers an extensive selection of interactive video games, traditional slots, progressive machines and table games. The Rolling Hills Casino also offers guests a variety of dining venues including Six Two Eight Steakhouses, Rock & Brews, Fat Burger , Double Down Cafe, and the Paskenta Mad River Brewery, in Blue Lakes, Ca. - Updated August 2026

In 1999, the tribe entered into a Tribal-State gaming compact with the State of California in order to conduct Class III gaming on trust land. The construction of Rolling Hills Casino began soon after and the casino opened in 2002.
