= Waikosel, California =

Former Native American settlement in Colusa County, California

Coordinates: 39.0674°N 122.0050°W

Waikosel (also, Wai-ko-sel, Wicosels, Wi'-ko-sel', Wi'kow, Waika'-u, Waikau, or Wycows) is a former Native American settlement in Colusa County, California, United States.

It was a village of the 'Klet win, on Cortina Creek, "half a mile below Green's Ranch". The name means "north place". The name "Waikosel" was also given to the tribe living along Cortina Creek, for whom this was the central settlement until around 1888, succeeding another earlier settlement two miles upstream.
