= Sacramento River massacre =

Mass killing of Wintu people in Northern California

Coordinates: 40.585°N 122.374°W

- Part of the California genocide
- Location: California
- Date: 5 April 1846
- Target: Wintu people
- Attack type: Shooting
- Deaths: Estimates of "120-150" up to "600-700" shot and around 200 dying in the water.
- Injuries: Unknown
- Perpetrators: United States Army: John C. Frémont; Kit Carson
- Motive: American expansion into California

The Sacramento River massacre refers to the killing of many Wintu people on the banks of the Sacramento River on 5 April 1846 by an expedition band led by Captain John C. Frémont of Virginia. Estimates range from 125 to 900.

== History ==
=== Background ===
The expansionist movement of the 1840s motivated many Americans to work to push America's borders out into land owned by Mexico and Native American tribes. "Manifest Destiny", a term coined by journalist John L. O'Sullivan, captured the idea that the young American nation was destined to rule all of the North American continent.

Democratic Senator Thomas Hart Benton of Missouri was a prominent leader of this movement, into which he enlisted his son-in-law, John C. Frémont. Benton obtained government funding for several expeditions led by Frémont to map and explore the western territory.

In 1845, Captain Frémont was sent by the War Department on an expedition to survey the Great Basin and Alta California, a possession of Mexico. Upon arriving in western Alta California, Frémont and his men moved about the northern half of the present-day state for several months, provoking the Mexican authorities and building upon grievances and patriotic sentiment among Americans who had settled there.

=== Incident ===
On 30 March 1846, the band arrived at the Lassen Ranch in the upper Sacramento Valley. There they met Americans who claimed that an encampment of 1,000 Native Americans was preparing to attack White settlements. Frémont moved his men up the Sacramento River in search of such Native Americans. Frémont's party was made up of 60 white men, nine Delaware Indians, two California Indians, and five members of a nearby trading post. The party reached Reading's Ranch (near present-day Redding, California) on 5 April 1846 and spotted a large native camp. The area was hundreds of square miles and home to over 5,000 Wintu people.

Captain Frémont ordered an advance on the Native Americans, with every one of his men carrying a rifle, two pistols, and a knife. The soldiers advanced from three sides on the Wintu, who were unable to flee the camp as the majority of their ranks were women and children and they were pinned against the river. The men of the Wintu camp formed a defensive line with the women and children behind them.

Expedition member Thomas E. Breckenridge states that "the order was given to ask no quarter and to give none." Frémont's men lined up and began firing several rifle volleys, slaughtering the Native Americans in front of them. The long range of the rifles rendered it impossible for the Native Americans' arrows to reach them. The men then approached towards the camp, fired another volley at closer range, and rushed in with their sabers and pistols. Breckenridge writes:

The settlers charged into the village taking the warriors by surprise and then commenced a scene of slaughter which is unequalled in the West. The bucks, squaws and paposes were shot down like sheep and those men never stopped as long as they could find one alive.

The remaining Native Americans were forced to flee, with some running for the hills and others braving the river. Eyewitness William Isaac Tustin reports that men of Frémont's band mounted on horses chased down the running Native Americans and tomahawked them to death, while riflemen stood on the shores of the river and took potshots at the Native Americans trying to swim to safety. He described the scene as "a slaughter."

Estimates of the casualties vary. Expedition members Thomas E. Breckenridge and Thomas S. Martin claim the number of Native Americans killed as "120-150" and "over 175" respectively, but the eyewitness Tustin claimed that at least 600-700 Native Americans were killed on land, with another 200 or more dying in the water. There are no records of any expedition members being killed or even wounded in the massacre. Kit Carson, one of the mounted attackers, later stated, "It was a perfect butchery." Breckenridge, who claims not to have participated, laments:

I think that I hate an Indian as badly as anybody and have as good reason to hate them, but I don't think that I could have assisted in that slaughter. It takes two to fight or quarrel but in that case there was but one side fighting and the other side trying to escape.

Neither Frémont nor any of his expedition members were charged or punished in any way for the killings. Several expedition members suggested that the massacre led local Native Americans to fear the White men and avoid raiding the settlements and ranches that American settlers had begun erecting on Indigenous land.

== Aftermath ==
Frémont and his band continued up the Sacramento River, killing Native Americans on sight as they went. The Klamath people they encountered further north in Oregon Territory eventually retaliated and killed three members of Frémont's party on the night of 9 May 1846, leading to the Klamath Lake massacre three days later.

On 9 May 1846, Frémont received word that war with Mexico was imminent. He quickly returned from Oregon to participate, killing several more Sacramento Valley Native Americans in the journey south in the Sutter Buttes massacre. By August 1846, the American military had permanently occupied the sparsely populated northern half of present-day California, and by early January the entirety of the modern state was under American control. John C. Frémont became Military Governor of California in January 1847, but was forced to give up the position less than two months later under disputed circumstances. In 1850, Frémont became California's first U.S. Senator. Frémont, who in the meantime had become wealthy from gold mining claims, wrote a bill limiting gold mining claims to white citizens of the United States. In 1856, Frémont was nominated as the first U.S. presidential candidate of the fledgling Republican Party, losing the race to James Buchanan. He later fought as a Union general during the Civil War.

While some locals had admired the massacre, the wealthy landed settlers were beginning to depend on Native American labor in a sort of feudal system, with the Native Americans working both as free and as bonded labor. To some degree this saved the local Wintu from immediate annihilation, though smaller scale massacres occurred as early as the next year. By the 1850s, white American animosity at Native American possession of the land had built, and large-scale massacres involving hundreds of Wintu deaths recommenced, including the Kabyai Creek massacre, the Old Shasta Town massacre and the Bridge Gulch massacre.

== See also ==
- Klamath Lake massacre
- Sutter Buttes massacre
- Kern and Sutter massacres
- List of Indian massacres

== Bibliography ==
- Breckenridge, Thomas E. (1894). Thomas E. Breckenridge Memoirs. University of Missouri at Columbia: Western Historical Manuscripts Collection.
- Carson, Kit (1924). Kit Carson's Own Story of His Life, As dictated to Col. And Mrs. D.C. Peters about 1856-1857, and never before published. Taos, NM: Santa Fe New Mexican Publishing.
- Frémont, John Charles (1887). Memoirs of My Life, By John Charles Frémont. Chicago: Belford, Clark. ISBN 9780665141270.
- Heizer, Robert (1978). Handbook of North American Indians: California, Volume 8. Smithsonian Institution.
- Madley, Benjamin (2016). An American Genocide. Yale University Press.
- Martin, Thomas S. (1975). With Frémont to California and the Southwest 1845-1849. Ashland, OR: Lewis Osborne.
- Norton, Jack (1979). Genocide in Northwestern California: when our worlds cried. San Francisco: Indian Historian Press.
- Paddison, Joshua (1999). A World Transformed: Firsthand Accounts of California before the Gold Rush. Berkeley, CA: Heyday Books.
- Richards, Leonard L. (2007). The California Gold Rush and the Coming of the Civil War. New York, New York: Vintage Books.
- Sides, Hampton (2006). Blood and Thunder: An Epic of the American West. Random House Inc.
- Smith, Stacey L. (2013). Freedom's Frontier, California and the Struggle Over Unpaid Labor, Emancipation, and Reconstruction. UNC Press Books.
- Tustin, William Issac (1880). Recollections of Early Days in California. Bancroft Library.
