= Yocha Dehe Wintun Nation =

Coordinates: 38°44′14″N 122°07′44″W

Total population
- 36 rancheria population (2011)

Regions with significant populations
- United States (California)

Languages
- English, Patwin

Related ethnic groups
- other Wintun peoples

The Yocha Dehe Wintun Nation (/ˈjoʊtʃə ˈdiːhi ˈwɪntuːn/ YOH-chə DEE-hee WIN-toon) is a federally recognized tribe of Wintun people, specifically Patwin people or southern Wintun, in Yolo County, California. They were formerly known as the Rumsey Indian Rancheria of Wintun Indians of California.

== Government ==
The Yocha Dehe Wintun Nation is headquartered in Brooks, California. A democratically elected, five-person tribal council govern the tribe and operate tribal services and business ventures, such as Yocha Dehe Wintun Academy, Yocha Dehe Fire Department, Yocha Dehe Community Fund, Yocha Dehe Farm and Ranch, Cultural Resources Department, Health and Wellness Department, Environmental Department, Tribal Gaming Agency, and Cache Creek Casino Resort. The current tribal administration is as follows:

- Chairman: Anthony Roberts
- Secretary: Mia Durham
- Treasurer: Leland Kinter
- Council Member: Yvonne Perkins
- Council Member: Seth Lowell

== Reservation ==
Location of Rumsey Rancheria

The tribe's reservation is the Rumsey Rancheria, a federally recognized ranchería in the Coast Range. Established in 1907, the rancheria is 185 acres large.

== Culture ==
The Yocha Dehe Wintun are Patwin people, whose traditional territories are near the Sacramento River valley. The Patwin language is a Penutian language. Traditional subsistence included fishing king salmon, harvesting acorns, hunting, and gathering vegetables.

== Economic development ==
The Yocha Dehe Wintun Nation owns and operates the Cache Creek Casino Resort, which included a hotel, spa, and golf course, as well as several restaurants: C2 Steak and Seafood, Chang Shou, The Sports Page, Harvest Buffet, Canyon Cafe, The Deli, Asian Kitchen, Sweets Etc., and Loco Express, all located in Brooks.

The tribe's agricultural interests include wine grapes and arbequina olives. They package and market many of their products, including olive oils, vinegar and wine under the brand Seka Hills. They have two retail stores and tasting rooms in Yolo County, one in Brooks and one in Clarksburg in the Sacramento-San Joaquin Delta.

== Education ==
The ranchería is served by the Esparto Unified School District.

== See also ==
- Indigenous peoples of California
