= Walter Goldschmidt =

American anthropologist (1913–2010)

Walter Rochs Goldschmidt (February 24, 1913 – September 1, 2010) was an American anthropologist.

Goldschmidt was of German descent, born in San Antonio, Texas, on February 24, 1913, to Hermann and Gretchen Goldschmidt. He earned a bachelor's degree at the University of Texas at Austin in 1933, followed by a master's degree in 1935. Goldschmidt completed doctoral studies in 1942 at the University of California, Berkeley. Goldschmidt began work at the Bureau of Agricultural Economics, remaining a social science analyst there until 1946, when he joined the University of California, Los Angeles faculty. He served as editor of the journal American Anthropologist from 1956 to 1959, and was founding editor of another journal, Ethos. Between 1969 and 1970, Goldschmidt was president of the American Ethnological Society. He headed the American Anthropological Association in 1976. Goldschmidt was known for his research into the Hupa and Nomlaki indigenous people living in California, as well as the Tlingit and Haida of Alaska. In his later career, Goldschmidt took an interest to the Sebei people in Uganda. He was twice a Fulbright scholar and received the Bronislaw Malinowski Award. Goldschmidt was named an emeritus professor in the 1980s, though he continued academic research and writing well into retirement.

Goldschmidt married Beatrice Gale in 1937, whom he had two sons, Mark and Karl. Gale died in 1991, and Karl died in 2001. Walter Goldschmidt died at the Huntington Memorial Hospital in Pasadena, California, on September 1, 2010.
