= Little Vermilion River (Illinois) =

The Little Vermilion River may refer to two different rivers in Illinois, in the United States:

- Little Vermilion River (Illinois River)
- Little Vermilion River (Wabash River)
