= Nomlaki language =

Wintuan language of California, US

Nomlaki
- Central Wintun
- Nomlāqa Bōda
- Native to: United States
- Region: Northern California
- Ethnicity: Nomlaki people
- Native speakers: ≥1 partial speaker (2011)
- Language family: Wintuan: Northern; Nomlaki

Language codes
- ISO 639-3: nol
- Glottolog: noml1242

Nomlaki (Noamlakee), or Wintun, is a moribund Wintuan language of Northern California. It was not extensively documented; however, some recordings exist of speaker Andrew Freeman and Sylvester Simmons. There is at least one partial speaker left.

Nomlaki Indians, or in their own language Nomlāqa Bōda; nom is 'west', and lāqa is a verb form of 'speak', thus 'western speakers' (but 'western dwellers', J. Curtin 1898 in F. W. Hodge 1910).

== See also ==
- Paskenta Band of Nomlaki Indians
