= Patwin language =

Endangered indigenous language of northern California

Patwin
- Southern Wintun
- Wintun Tʼewe
- Native to: United States
- Region: Colusa, Lake, Napa, Solano, and Yolo Counties, northern California
- Ethnicity: Patwin
- Extinct: 2018, with the death of Bertha Wright Mitchell; 1 (2021)
- Revival: Being taught in schools and learned by adults
- Language family: Wintuan: Southern; Patwin
- Dialects: Hill Patwin; River Patwin; ?Southern Patwin

Language codes
- ISO 639-3: pwi
- Glottolog: patw1250
- ELP: Patwin
- Map of Patwin people and language

- Patwin is classified as Critically Endangered by the UNESCO Atlas of the World's Languages in Danger.

Patwin (Patween, Patwin: Wintun Tʼewe) is a critically endangered Wintuan language of Northern California. As of 2021, there was one documented first language speaker of Patwin. As of 2010, Patwin language classes were taught at the Yocha Dehe Wintun Nation (formerly Rumsey Rancheria) tribal school.

Patwin has two (excl. Southern Patwin) or three (incl. Southern Patwin) dialects: "River Patwin (or Valley Patwin) was traditionally spoken along the Sacramento River in Colusa County ... Hill Patwin, was spoken in the plains and foothills to the west."

Southern Patwin became extinct shortly after contact. It is very poorly attested, and may be a separate Southern Wintuan language.

As of 2012, the Tewe Kewe Cultural Center of the Yocha Dehe Wintun Nation has "a California Indian Library Collection and an extensive Patwin language and history research section."

== Phonemes ==
=== Consonants ===
Patwin has 25 consonant phonemes. In the table below, the IPA form(s) of each consonant are given. This is followed by the form commonly used in Lawyer (2021)'s grammar, if this is different from the IPA form.

		Bilabial	Alveolar		Post- alveolar	Palatal	Velar	Glottal
		Bilabial	median	lateral	Post- alveolar	Palatal	Velar	Glottal
Plosive	voiceless	p	t				k	(ʔ)
Plosive	aspirated	pʰ	tʰ				kʰ	
Plosive	glottalized	pʼ	tʼ				kʼ	
Plosive	voiced	b	d					
Nasal		m	n					
Fricative			s	ɬ ⟨ƚ⟩				h
Affricate	voiceless			t͡ɬ ⟨ƛ⟩	t͡ʃ ⟨č⟩			
Affricate	glottalized			t͡ɬʼ ⟨ƛʼ⟩	t͡ʃʼ ⟨čʼ⟩			
Trill/Flap			r̥ ~ ɾ ⟨r⟩					
Approximant		w		l		j ⟨y⟩	w	

- /ʔ/ is a marginal phoneme, occurring exclusively at morpheme boundaries. Its distribution is not entirely predictable, however.
- Glottalized and aspirated consonants occur only syllable-initially.
- Some or all of the "alveolar" consonants (both central and lateral) would be more accurately described as being retracted alveolar consonants.

=== Vowels ===
Patwin has 10 vowels:

	Short		Long	
	Front	Back	Front	Back
High (close)	i	u	iː ⟨i·⟩	uː ⟨u·⟩
Mid	e	o	eː ⟨e·⟩	oː ⟨o·⟩
Low (open)	a		aː ⟨a·⟩	

- Patwin vowels have a simple length distinction (short vs. long).
- All vowels are voiced and oral.

== Orthography ==
Patwin Alphabet
a	a·	b	č	č’	d	e	e·	h	i	i·	k	kʰ	k’	l	ɬ	ƛ	ƛ’	m	n	o	o·	p	pʰ	p’	r	s	t	tʰ	t’	u	u·	w	y	ʔ
