= Bridge Gulch massacre =

1852 murder of Wintu people in California

Coordinates: 40°29′31.28″N 123°6′14.36″W

The Bridge Gulch massacre, also known as the Hayfork massacre or Natural Bridge massacre, occurred in the United States during the California gold rush on April 23, 1852, when more than 150 Wintu people were killed by about 70 American men led by William H. Dixon, the sheriff of Trinity County in northern California.

== History ==
The massacre was in response to the killing of Colonel John Anderson allegedly by the Wintu. These accusations were made by the sheriff of Trinity County, William H. Dixon who formed a posse of 69 men. The Americans tracked the Wintu but were unable to locate the particular group responsible, instead locating another group on a part of Hayfork Creek south of the Hayfork Valley known as Bridge Gulch (in Wintu qookši čopči', meaning skinned hide) where they had made camp. They waited until early morning before attacking, to ensure that nobody could escape. When daylight broke they attacked the Wintu, who were just beginning to awaken. More than 150 Wintu people were killed, with only about three scattered children surviving the attack.

Descendants of those massacred have stated that about 500 or 600 Wintu were massacred, and the few survivors escaped by hiding in nearby caves. These numbers are often disputed Those Wintu killed in the massacre were not responsible for the death of John Anderson, who was killed by Wintu from a different band.

Native Americans in California experienced several decades of genocide as the white settlers started to arrive from the east and the Midwest. Miners, ranchers and other settlers flooded into the region to occupy lands belonging to Native Americans. As more and more white settlers arrived, Native Americans were forced from their homelands and the most valuable lands, and conflicts erupted. In addition to the loss of land and resources, and the conflicts over new settlements, Native Americans suffered from introduced diseases and were subject to violence and murder at the hands of the newcomers, sometimes aided or led by U.S. military troops. Legal loopholes or the absence of a strong, local judicial system also prevented the white killers being brought to justice. Tall tales and rumors circulated by words of mouth or by the press also contributed to mass participation in the killings and galvanized people's tacit consent to those killings.

While mid-19th century California law did not explicitly permit the killing of Native Americans, it also prevented any non-white (i.e., Native American) witnesses providing evidence against white defendants. According to Californian state law, the punishment for stealing livestock was 25 lashes and a 200 dollar fine (Lindsay, 202). Many White settlers apparently found such a measure too lenient and not enough to deter the Indians from stealing their livestock. They often raided Indian villages and executed the men and women on the spot. More gruesome still, they often killed the children and infants as well. This is clearly a violation of state law and outright murder. Unfortunately, because of the legal loopholes and widespread support for those killings, these men were never prosecuted by law.

The white settlers often found it convenient to portray Indians as subhuman and inferior to white people. In this way, it became justifiable in their conscience to kill their fellow human beings of "the other" race. Indians were perceived as "savages" and seen as living in "misery" (Lindsay, 194). As a result, killing Indians was another way to "stop their misery." These notions may partially explain the indiscriminate killing of Native men and women in California after disputes in land settlements erupted. The white settlers saw themselves as a superior race; as a result, they saw themselves as having a "manifest destiny" to hold all the land to the Pacific Ocean. They sincerely believed that they could make better use of the land by farming. This land would be "wasted" left in the hands of the Indians. Accounts and rumors describing Indians as "bloodthirsty killers" also helped to demonize the Indians in the minds of the white people.

== Site ==
The natural bridge is 150 feet (46 m) long and about 30 feet (9.1 m) high, on Dobbins Gulch Road. Trails are administered by the U.S. Forest Service at the Natural Bridge Picnic Area off of Wildwood Road (County Road 302) in Trinity County.

== See also ==
- Indigenous peoples of California
- Native American history of California—related topics
