= James Clyman =

American mountain man

An illustration of Clyman from Charles Kelly's book Salt Desert Trails (1930)

James Clyman (February 1, 1792 – December 27, 1881) was a mountain man and an explorer and guide in the American Far West.

== Early life ==
James Clyman was born on a farm that belonged to George Washington in Fauquier County, Virginia, in 1792. Clyman's family started to migrate from place to place when Clyman was 15, moving from Virginia to Pennsylvania, and then to Ohio. In 1811, his family decided to settle in Stark County, Ohio. In 1812, Clyman became a ranger to fight the Shawnee Indians in the War of 1812. After the war, he took up farming in Indiana, where he also traded with local Indians. In 1821, he became a surveyor working near the Little Vermilion River in Illinois. He was hired by a son of Alexander Hamilton, who was running government surveys, to make surveys along the Sangamon River.

== Mountain Man ==
While collecting his pay in St. Louis in 1823, Clyman met William H. Ashley, and joined his 1823 expedition. Clyman remained with them until 1827. He fought in the Arikara War in 1823. As a member of Ashley's expedition, Clyman wrote one of the two accounts detailing Hugh Glass's mauling by grizzly bear. Clyman also traveled with Jedediah Smith, whose scalp and ear he sewed back on following a savage grizzly bear mauling, and Thomas Fitzpatrick in the discovery of the South Pass. He also was a member of the party of four that paddled around the Great Salt Lake and put to rest the myth of the Buenaventura River.

After his explorations, he bought a farm, near Danville, Vermilion County, Illinois and set up a store there. When the Blackhawk War broke out in 1832, Clyman joined the fight. He left the army in early 1834 and returned to Illinois. Less than a year later, he returned to Wisconsin, arriving there in January 1835. He spent some time in Milwaukee County and made the decision to venture further north in the fall with his friend Ellsworth Burnett. They left on November 4, 1835 and on the second day out, they were attacked by two Native American men near present-day Theresa, Dodge County. Burnett was killed, while Clyman was wounded but managed to escape and hide in the woods. This story became well known in the region and when in the years afterwards immigrants started to settle Dodge County they named one of the towns "Clyman" to remember what once happened in the area.

In later years, he traveled back West, crossing the Great Salt Lake Desert and the Sierra Nevada. On his way back, he encountered the Donner-Reed Party and accompanying parties. He advised them to avoid taking a shortcut and remain on the regular route. They did not heed his warning and ended up resorting to cannibalism after becoming stranded and trapped by an early blizzard in the Sierra Nevada.

In 1848, Clyman settled in the Napa County, California where he built a home on Redwood Road. He died there in 1881 and was buried in the Tulocay Cemetery in Napa, California. The Clyman home went on the market in early 2022 following a major restoration.

== James Clyman in Media ==
James Clyman wrote a diary which was viewed as valuable because he did not exaggerate and maintained accurate, non-dramatic descriptions of landforms, Native American Tribes, and people. It was typical for other mountain men of the time to exaggerate or outright fabricate stories and facts. James Clyman was a trusted voice and his writings were trusted by other explorers and government officials. The California Historical Society describes Clyman as having a "kindliness, energy, good humor, keen sense of observation, shrewd common sense, innate honesty and cool self-confidence". The 2015 film The Revenant was based on James Clyman's writings about Hugh Glass, a fellow frontiersman. Clyman's writings were featured in newspapers in the 1820s and 1840s, helping eastern readers learn about happenings in the wild west. He allowed press workers to access some parts of his diary for this at the time.

=== Television and Film ===
As of 2026 no feature film has been produced yet directly on James Clyman, and the period of the American West from Lewis and Clark (1804) to the California Gold Rush (1849) has less films produced than the post 1860s period which was well covered during the golden age of American and Spagetti Westerns.

2015 - The Alejandro G. Iñárritu film The Revenant was a high budget production which covered the era of fur trappers and explorers that Clyman lived in.

2021 - Mountain Man Jim Clyman & Update is a talk focused on James Clyman by the Wild West Extravaganza Podcast. This podcast has attracted a niche audience of people who have a passion for the wild west and its stories.

2023 - Into the Wild Frontier - Jim Clyman: Frontier Survivor is a television documentary focused on James Clyman. This production focuses on his time in the Ashley party, and the Arikara War in 1823.

== Sources ==
- DeVoto, Bernard The Year of Decision: 1846 Boston: Little, Brown, 1943.
- Morgan, Dale L. Jedediah Smith and the Opening of the American West. University of Nebraska Press, 1964.
- Stone, Irving. Men to Match my Mountains. New York, 1956.
