= Patwin =

Indigenous people in Northern California

Map of Patwin territory

The Patwin (also Patween and Southern Wintu) are a band of Wintun people in Northern California. The Patwin comprise the southern branch of the Wintun group, Native inhabitants of California since approximately 500.

Today, Patwin people are enrolled in three federally recognized tribes:

- Cachil DeHe Band of Wintun Indians of the Colusa Indian Community of the Colusa Rancheria
- Kletsel Dehe Band of Wintun Indians
- Yocha Dehe Wintun Nation

== Territory ==
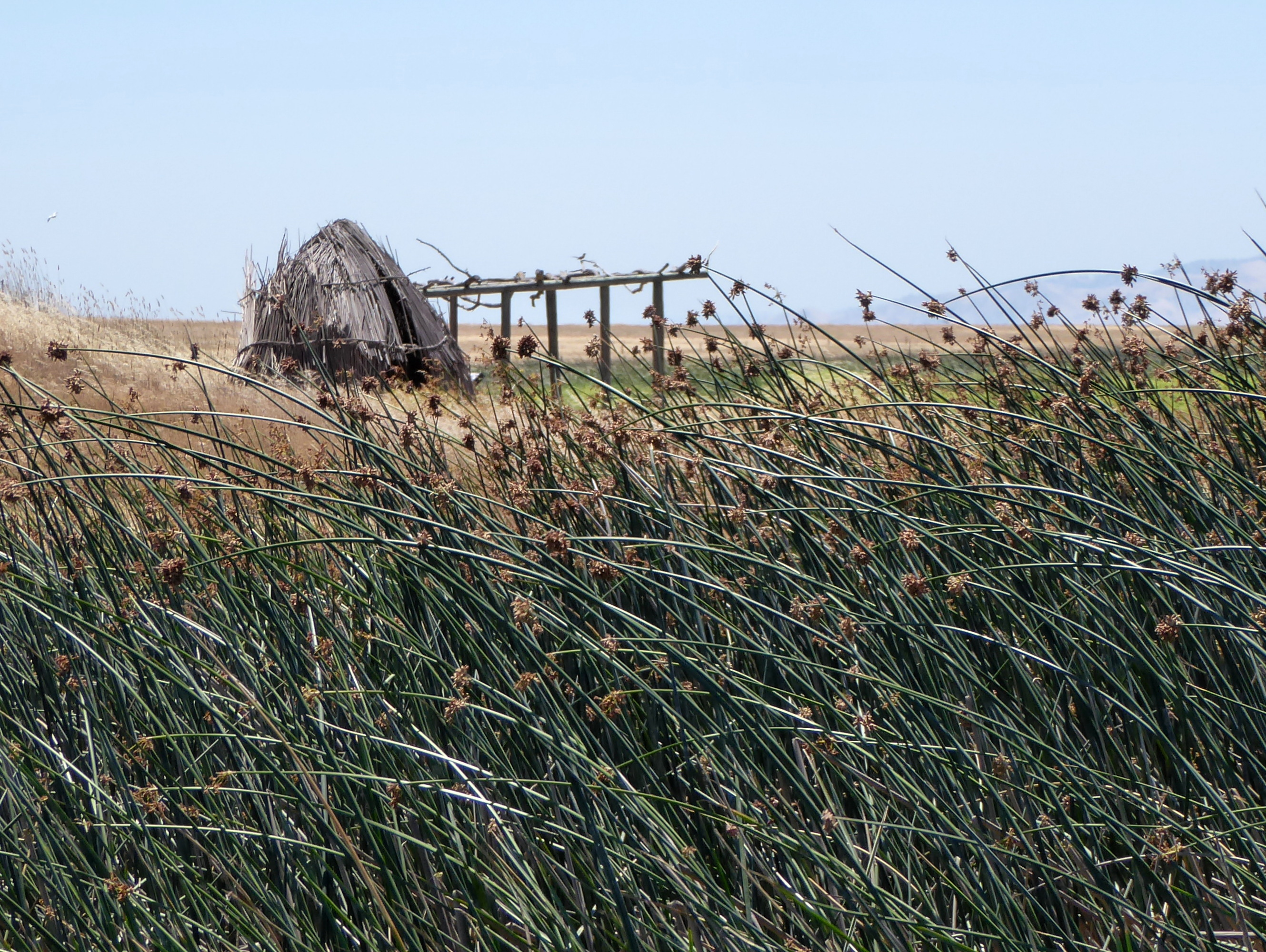
A reconstructed Patwin reed hut at Rush Ranch Open Space, Solano County

The Patwin were bordered by the Yuki in the northwest; the Nomlaki (Wintun) in the north; the Konkow (Maidu) in the northeast; the Nisenan (Maidu) and Plains Miwok in the east; the Bay Miwok to the south; the Coast Miwok in the southwest; and the Wappo, Lake Miwok, and Pomo in the west.

The "Southern Patwins" have historically lived between what is now Suisun, Vacaville, and Putah Creek. By 1800, the Spanish and other European settlers forced them into small tribal units: Ululatos (Vacaville), Labaytos (Putah Creek), Malacas (Lagoon Valley), Tolenas (Upper Suisun Valley), and Suisunes (Suisun Marsh and Plain).

== Language ==
The Patwin language is a Southern Wintuan language. As of 2021, one Patwin person was a documented first-language speaker of Patwin. The Patwin language also has two main dialects. The two dialects differentiate based on location. The first Patwin dialect known as River Patwin, which is mainly used along the Sacramento River located in Colusa County. The second dialect is Hill Patwin, which is the language commonly used in the hills and plains to the west of the Sacramento River. The Patwin language is also in a family of other known Indigenous languages such as Nomlaki and also as mentioned before Wintu. All together these three languages belong to the Penutian language family. However these languages are also have close relations to other Indigenous languages such as; Maiduan, Miwokan, Ohlone, and the Yokuts.

As stated earlier, one Patwin person was documented as first-language speaker. However, many tribal members and activist are pursuing the reclamation of the Yocha Dehe Wintu Nation. Bertha Wright Mitchell also known as Auntie Bertha, by many is responsible for keeping the language and culture of the Yocha Dehe Wintun Nation together. Teaching Patwin to the younger generation was the key component that Auntie Bertha gave to the community, keeping the language and culture thriving and from steering away of the notion that the Patwin language was becoming extinct after being listed as a at-risk language in 1997.

== Population ==
Estimates for the pre-contact populations of most Native groups in California have varied substantially. Alfred L. Kroeber put the 1770 population of the Wintun, including the Patwin, Nomlaki, and Wintu proper, at 12,000. Sherburne F. Cook (1976a:180-181) estimated the combined population of the Patwin and Nomlaki at 11,300, of which 3,300 represented the southern Patwin. He subsequently raised his figure for the southern Patwin to 5,000.

The migration of American settlers during the Gold Rush, which began in 1848, profoundly affected the Indigenous communities in California, particularly the Patwin people. Thousands of migrants, predominantly men, flocked to California in search of wealth. This influx led to the displacement of Native communities, exposing them to diseases, violent raids, and the degradation of their environment due to resource extraction.

Prior to the Gold Rush, the Patwin resided in settled villages throughout the western Sacramento Valley, engaging in traditional practices of hunting, gathering, and fishing. The arrival of Western migrants severely disrupted this way of life as settler expansion encroached on their lands. Areas crucial for acorn gathering and access to water were taken or destroyed to make way for mining, ranching, and agricultural development.

Historian Sherburne F. Cooke documents a significant population decline among the Patwin during this period, primarily attributed to disease outbreaks such as smallpox and measles. The indirect effects of colonization and displacement further exacerbated this decline. The Patwin were also compelled to perform unpaid labor in various settings, from domestic residences to mining operations, a practice that has been described as a form of “the other slavery.”

By the late 1850s, the Patwin population had dwindled to a mere fraction of its pre-contact numbers, mirroring the widespread decline experienced by Indigenous tribes in California throughout the Gold Rush era.

Kroeber estimated the population of the combined Wintun groups in 1910 as 1,000. By the 1920s, no Patwin remained along Putah Creek and few were left in the area. Today, Wintun descendants of the three groups (i.e. the Patwin, Nomlaki, and Wintu proper) total about 2,500 people.

== Villages ==
- Aguasto
- Bo´-do
- Chemocu
- Churup
- Dok´–dok
- Gapa
- Ho´lokomi
- Imil
- Katsil
- Kisi
- Koh´pah de´-he
- Koru
- Kusêmpu
- Liwai
- Lopa
- Moso
- Napato
- Nawidihu
- No´pah
- P’ālo
- Putato
- Si'-ko-pe
- Soneto
- Sukui
- Suskol
- Tebti
- Til-til
- Tokti
- Tolenas
- Tulukai
- Ululato
- Yo´doi
- Yulyul

== Archaeology ==
Patwin Indian remains were discovered at the Mondavi Center construction site beginning in 1999, and consequently, the University of California, Davis, built a Native American Contemplative Garden within the Arboretum, a project honoring the Patwin.

== Notable Patwin people ==
- Mabel McKay (1907–1994), basket weaver and healer
- Sem-Yeto (c. 1798 – c. 1851), 19th-century leader and diplomat, also known as "Chief Solano"

== See also ==
- Fully feathered basket
