= John L. O'Sullivan =

American columnist and politician (1813–1895)

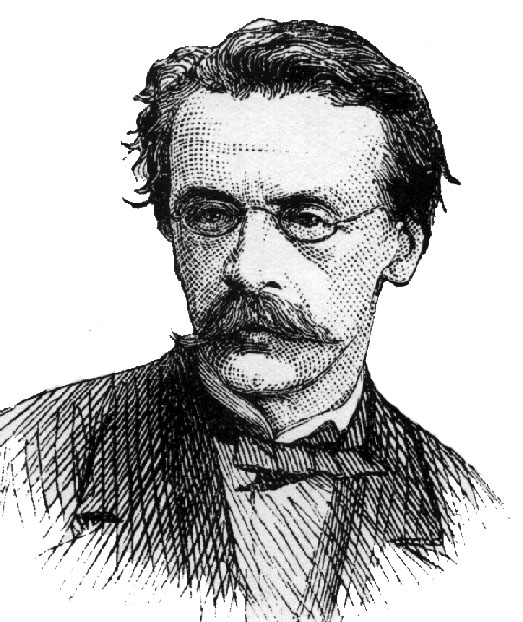
- O'Sullivan as he appeared on the cover of Harper's Weekly in November 1874. He was then attending a conference in Geneva that sought to create a process of international arbitration in order to prevent wars.

United States Minister to Portugal
- In office June 16, 1854 – July 15, 1858
- President: Franklin Pierce; James Buchanan
- Preceded by: Charles Brickett Haddock
- Succeeded by: George W. Morgan

Personal details
- Born: November 15, 1813 At sea (coast of Gibraltar)
- Died: March 24, 1895 (aged 81) New York City, New York, U.S.
- Party: Democratic
- Spouse: Susan Kearny Rodgers
- Education: Columbia College
- Known for: Coining the phrase "Manifest destiny" in 1845

John Louis O'Sullivan (November 15, 1813 – March 24, 1895) was an American columnist, editor, and diplomat who is known for coining the iconic phrase "manifest destiny" in 1845, in order to promote the annexation of Texas and the Oregon Country into the United States. O'Sullivan was an influential political writer and advocate for the Democratic Party at the time, who also served as U.S. minister to Portugal during the administration of President Franklin Pierce (1853–1857) and President James Buchanan (1857-1861).

== Early life and education ==
John Louis O'Sullivan, born on November 15, 1813, the son of John Thomas O'Sullivan, an Irish-born American diplomat and sea captain, and Mary Rowly, a genteel Englishwoman. According to legend, he was born at sea on a British warship off the coast of Gibraltar. O'Sullivan's father was a naturalized US citizen and had served as US Consul to the Barbary States.

O'Sullivan enrolled at Columbia College in New York city at the age of 14 where he was a member of the Philolexian Society.. He graduated in 1831. In 1834, he received a Masters of Arts and became a lawyer.

== Career ==
In 1837, he founded and edited The United States Magazine and Democratic Review, based in Washington. It espoused the more radical forms of Jacksonian democracy and the cause of a democratic, American literature. It published some of the most prominent American writers, including Nathaniel Hawthorne, Ralph Waldo Emerson, Henry David Thoreau, John Greenleaf Whittier, William Cullen Bryant, and Walt Whitman. O'Sullivan was an aggressive reformer in the New York State Legislature, where he led the unsuccessful movement to abolish capital punishment. By 1846, investors were dissatisfied with his poor management, and he lost control of his magazine.

O'Sullivan opposed the coming of the American Civil War, hoping that a peaceful solution, or ultimately a peaceful separation of North and South, could be settled. In Europe when the war began, O'Sullivan became an active supporter of the Copperhead movement; he may have been on the Confederate payroll at some point. O'Sullivan wrote a number of pamphlets promoting the Confederate cause, arguing that the Lincoln presidency had become too powerful and that states' rights needed to be protected against encroachment by the central government. Although he had earlier supported the "free soil" movement, he now defended the institution of slavery, writing that blacks and whites could not live together in harmony. Not surprisingly, his perceived ideological shift greatly disappointed some of his old friends, including Hawthorne. Towards the end of the Civil War, O'Sullivan appealed to his southern "comrades in arms" to burn Richmond, stating "let every man set fire to his own house".

== See also ==
- Young America Movement
