= Nomlaki =

Nomlāqa Bōda

Total population
- 332

Regions with significant populations
- United States (California)

Languages
- English, formerly Nomlaki

Religion
- Roundhouse religion, Christianity

Related ethnic groups
- other Wintun people

The Nomlaki (also Noamlakee, Central Wintu, or Nomelaki) are a Wintun people indigenous to what are now known as the Sacramento Valley and the Coast Range in Northern California. They were bordered by the Wintu (Wintun) in the north, the Yana in the northeast and east, the Konkow (Maiduan) in the east, the Patwin (Wintun) in the south, and the Yuki in the west.

== Nomlaki groups ==
There are two main groups:

- The River Nomlaki lived in the Sacramento River region of the valley.
- The Hill Nomlaki lived west of the River Nomlaki. Their territory is now within Glenn and Tehama counties and the River Nomlaki region.

== Culture ==
A diverse array of oak species flourished throughout Nomlaki territory, with the population utilizing a minimum of eight distinct acorn varieties. Certain oak trees were regarded as the property of specific individuals. The collection of acorns and supplementary plant-based foods was predominantly undertaken by women and children. Beyond acorns, they procured pine nuts, numerous seed varieties, and tubers. A selection of nuts and seeds underwent desiccation and preservation for consumption throughout the annual cycle. Clover was consumed in its fresh state, prepared in the manner of a salad. The forests yielded an assortment of fruits, berries, and fungi. Salt was extracted from the banks of particular streams during the spring season. Family houses were constructed utilizing curved saplings, which are young trees characterized by their inherent flexibility.

== Language ==
The Nomlaki spoke a Wintuan language of the same name. It was not extensively documented, and is known only partially today. However, some recordings exist of speakers Andrew Freeman and Sylvester Simmons.

== Population ==
Estimates for the pre-contact populations of most Native groups in California have varied substantially. (See Population of Native California.) Alfred L. Kroeber (1925:883) put the combined 1770 population of the Nomlaki, Wintu, and Patwin at 12,000. Sherburne F. Cook (1976:180-181) estimated the combined population of the Nomlaki and northern Patwin as 8,000. Walter Goldschmidt (1978:341) thought that the pre-contact population of the Nomlaki was probably more than 2,000.

Kroeber estimated the population of the Nomlaki, Wintu, and Patwin in 1910 as 1,000.

== Today ==
The US federal government restored the Paskenta Band of Nomlaki Indians to full tribal status in 1994. They were able to acquire land, the Paskenta Rancheria (39°52′05″N 122°13′28″W), and establish the Rolling Hills Casino outside of Corning, California. Some Nomlaki are enrolled there, as well as the federally recognized Grindstone Indian Rancheria and Round Valley Indian Tribes.

== See also ==
- Wintun
- Wintu
- Wintuan languages
- Wintu-Nomlaki traditional narratives
