= Wintu language =

Extinct Native American language formerly spoken in California

Wintu
- Northern Wintun
- Pronunciation: [wintʰuːh]
- Native to: United States
- Region: Shasta County, Trinity County, California
- Ethnicity: Wintu people
- Extinct: 2003, with the death of Flora Jones; 1 partial speaker (2011)
- Revival: 2011
- Language family: Wintuan: Northern; Wintu

Language codes
- ISO 639-3: wnw
- Glottolog: nucl1651
- ELP: Wintu
- Wintu-Nomlaki is classified as Critically Endangered by the UNESCO Atlas of the World's Languages in Danger.

- Person: Wintʰu
- People: Wintʰun
- Language: Wintʰuh
- Country: Wintʰu Pom

Wintu (/wɪnˈtuː/ win-TOO) is a Wintuan language formerly spoken by the Wintu people of Northern California. It is the northernmost member of the Wintun family of languages. The Wintun family of languages was spoken in the Shasta County, Trinity County, Sacramento River Valley and in adjacent areas up to the Carquinez Strait of San Francisco Bay. Wintun is a branch of the hypothetical Penutian language phylum, or stock of languages of western North America, more closely related to four other families of Penutian languages spoken in California: Maiduan, Miwokan, Yokuts, and Costanoan.

As of 2011, Headman Marc Franco of the Winnemem Wintu has been working with the Indigenous Language Institute on revitalization of the Winnemem Wintu language.

== Phonology ==
=== Consonants ===
Wintu has 28 (to 30) consonants:

		Labial	Dental/Alveolar		Post- alveolar	Velar	Uvular	Glottal
		Labial	median	lateral	Post- alveolar	Velar	Uvular	Glottal
Plosive/ Affricate	voiced	b	d		(d͡ʒ)			
Plosive/ Affricate	aspirated	pʰ	tʰ					
Plosive/ Affricate	ejective	pʼ	tʼ	t͡ɬʼ ⟨ƛ'⟩	t͡ʃʼ ⟨ch'⟩	kʼ	qχʼ	
Plosive/ Affricate	tenuis	p	t	t͡ɬ ~ ɬ ⟨ƛ⟩	t͡ʃ ⟨j⟩	k	q	ʔ ⟨'⟩
Fricative		(f)	(θ)	t͡ɬ ~ ɬ ⟨ƛ⟩	ʃ ⟨sh⟩	x	χ	h
Nasal		m	n					
Trill					ɽr ⟨ṛ⟩			
Approximant		w		l	j ⟨y⟩			

- /f, dʒ/ are nonnative phonemes borrowed from English.
- /θ/ is a rare phoneme that occurred, only word finally, in only one of Pitkin's informants (his main consultant. In other speakers, it has merged with /tɬ/.
- Dental stops are denti-alveolar: [d̪, t̪ʰ, t̪ʼ, t̪]. Younger speakers, however, employ (apico-)alveolar articulations as in English [d, tʰ, tʼ, t].
- /tɬ/ is usually a fricative [ɬ] but occasionally an affricate among McCloud speakers while Trinity speakers have only the affricate. It is interdental after non-low front vowels /i, e/, post-dental after low /a/, and retroflex [ʈꞎ, ꞎ] after non-low back /u, o/.
- In the speech of older speakers, postalveolar /ʃ/ is retroflex [ʂ] adjacent to back vowels /u, o, a/.
- /k, kʼ, x/ are advanced before non-low front vowels /i, e/ and retracted before non-low back vowels /u, o/. In the manner of articulation, velars and post-velars can be glottalized and non-glottalized (voiceless).
- /ɽr/ is apico-postalveolar retroflex. It occurs as a tap [ɽ] intervocalically.
- The glottal stop /ʔ/ is weakly articulated except when the speaker is being deliberate or emphatic. It is always fully articulated word-finally.

=== Vowels ===
Wintu has 10 (or 11) vowels:

	Front		Central		Back	
	short	long	short	long	short	long
Close	i	iː			u	uː
Mid	e	eː			o	oː
Open	(æ)		a	aː		

- Wintu has short and long vowels.
- /æ/ is a phoneme that only occurs in borrowed English words.
- All vowels are slightly nasalized before the glottal consonant /ʔ/
- All vowels are voiced and oral (except for the above-mentioned nasal allophones).

=== Syllable structure ===
Segmental phonemes must have an obligatory single onset consonant. A rhyme typically consists of a vowel nucleus—either long or short—optionally followed by a single consonant. The syllabic canon is

CV(ː)(C).

Some examples of a generic syllable structure are:

CV [qa]=and, or.
CVː [miː]=tree
CVC [nuq]=pus
CVːC [baːs]=food.

Consonant clusters can only form when two closed syllables join together. For instance, such clusters occur when one syllable that ends in a consonant is immediately followed by another syllable within the same word. Examples of consonant clusters include:

CVC.CVC [pot.xom]=poison oak.
CVC.CVːC [net.taːn]=my father.
CVC.CVC [ʔel.ʔih]=you put it in.

Vowels may be long, but sequences of vowels do not occur.

=== Stress ===
Syllable stress in Wintu are predictable components of two junctures hyphen/-/ and plus/+/. There are four phonemic junctures ranked by their magnitude: Plus/+/, hyphen/-/, comma/,/ and period/./.

- Plus juncture is a central juncture. In Plus Juncture the location of the pitch and the stress in a phonemic word is determined by the structure of the syllable and its position relative to the juncture.

Syllables are determined by the presence or absence of vowels and semi-vowels. Light syllables contain short vowels. Heavy syllables contain short vowels followed by a semi-vowel. Extra-heavy syllables contain long vowels. The prominent syllable of a phonemic word is always the first, unless the second syllable is heavier, in which case the second syllable is stressed.

- Degree of intensity

In the primary stress, the greater the magnitude of the preceding juncture, the greater the intensity of the stress. The secondary stress, on the other hand, occurs when a heavy syllable follows the prominent syllable and varies in intensity. The weakest stress occurs when a syllable is not stressed and follows immediately after a phonemic juncture.

Ex. Extra heavy syllable: bóꞏs= house.
Ex. Syllable with secondary stress: ní= I.
Ex. Light Syllable: Liláꞏ=to accuse.

- The Hyphen Juncture occurs with phonemic words and it represents a phonemically functional unity with particular phonetic proprieties that contrast with other junctures.

Like the plus juncture, the hyphen juncture affects the location of higher pitch and stress. But instead of conditioning the location of the syllables like the plus juncture, the hyphen shifts the pitch and the stress. The Hyphen juncture is the juncture with the least magnitude, being the only one occurring within words (for example, following certain prefixes and preceding some auxiliaries and enclitics).

Ex./+maꞏtceki+/ ear wax.
Ex./+maꞏt-ceki-/one split ear.
Ex./+ʔelwine+/ with, along, accompanying.
Ex./+ʔel-wine-/ to look straight in the eye.

- Comma juncture/,/

It has two phonetic features: a fully realised pause accompanied or preceded by glottal stricture.

- Period Juncture/./

It is the juncture with the greatest magnitude and it has four phonetic features:

- A fully realised pause
- An associated glottal structure
- A preceding phrasal accent of unpredictable location
- A terminal pitch contour that drops sharply in pitch level and voicing

Period juncture delimits phonemic sentences.

Ex. baꞏ-s-boꞏsin+ net, nis+λiya. They threw rocks at me because I was eating.
Ex. baꞏs-boꞏsin+ mat, mis+ λiya. They threw rocks at you because you were eating.

- Phrasal Accent

It consists of very high pitch and particularly heavy stress.

Ex. Sukuyum+ límcada.=my dog is sick.
EX. Súkuyum+ límcada.=my dog is sick.

=== Phonological processes ===
A vast number of phonological processes occur in the Wintu language.

- The glottalized velars are pronounced with a slight friction of the tongue when they are in contact with certain vowels in particular contexts.

For example, /kʼ/ becomes prevelar before /i/ and /e/ but it is velar before /ʔa/ and it is backed before /u/ and /o/. In a similar way, the glottalized velar /qʼ/ is pronounced with more friction at the point of articulation as /qʼˣ/. It is in a frontal position before /i/ and /e/ and becomes backed with all the other vowels.

- Among the stop consonants only /p/, /t/, and /k/ occur finally as well as initially.
- The labiodental /f/ is an anomalous phoneme and it occurs only in two borrowed forms /foriĴulay/ 'Fourth of July' and /frihoꞏ lis/ 'beans'.
- Older speakers pronounce /s/ as /ṣ/, a retroflexed post-alveolar slit before or after /a/, /o/ and /u/ while younger speakers use /s/ everywhere.
- /h/ becomes a glottal spirant before /u/, /o/ and /a/, as in /haꞏsma/, to keep on yawning.
- /r/ is a voiced trill but when it occurs between vowels it becomes a voiced flap, as for example /yor/ tear (imperative form) and /yura/ to tear (infinitive form).
- /l/ a lateral apical-alveolar, is sometime confused with /r/ as in the word /lileter/ a corn meal.

== Morphology ==
Wintu possesses a sophisticated morphology with some polysynthetic characteristics. The combination of its morphemes into words involves several processes such as suffixation, prefixation, compounding, reduplication and consonant and vocalic ablaut. Nevertheless, the most common process is suffixation, which occurs primarily in verbs.

=== Vowel ablaut ===
The vowel ablaut is a change in the height (gradation) of the root-syllable vowels and it affects the vowel quantity. In Wintu, the vowel ablaut occurs only in the mutations of some verb-root vowels (called dissimilation), or in some root-deriving suffixes (assimilation). Root-vowel dissimilation is conditioned by the height of the vowel in the following syllable, while the suffix vowel assimilation is conditioned by the quantity of the vowel in the preceding syllable. An example of dissimilation takes place when /e/ and /o/, which occurs only in root syllables, are raised in height when they are preceded by a single consonant and followed by the low vowel /a/ in the next syllable.

Ex. lEla-/lila/ "to transform" and lElu-/lelu/ "transform".

An example of dissimilation takes place when the morphophoneme [V]assimilates completely to the quality of the vowel that precedes in the previous syllable.

Ex.cewVlVlVha=/ceweleleha/ "many to be wide open".

=== Consonant ablaut ===
A small amount of consonant ablaut is also present in Wintu; for example, before word juncture, /cʼ/ and /b/ change to /p/.

=== Nouns ===
Substantives are marked for aspect and case. There are two different types of substantives: those formed directly from roots (pronouns, non-possessed nouns, kinship terms) and those based on forms of complex derivation from radical and stems (mostly nouns). Pronouns can be singular, dual, and plural. They have particular suffixes (possessive for instrumental functions and for marking plural humans.) They are also very similar to verbs. Nouns have a variety of roots, they are an open class, they may show number in rare forms and they do not distinguish possessive from instrumental functions. Nouns can be classified in possessed and non possessed. The noun is composed of two elements:a stem and a suffix. The stem is usually a root. The suffixes specify numbers, animateness, personification or individuation. Some nouns have the same stem but have a different generic and particular meaning. Ex. /tu/ (particular aspect) eye; (generic aspect) face(s). The suffixes of the nouns can also have different cases: object [um](sedem-coyote), genitive[un](seden), locative [in], instrumental [r], possessive[t], emphatic possessive (reduplication of the last syllable).

=== Verbs ===
Verbs are the wider class of words in Wintu. Also several nouns derivate from verbs. The category of verbs has a very sophisticated morphological structure. Pitkin (1964) identifies three stem forms: indicative, imperative and nominal.

- Prefixes: optional in occurrence, when affixed directly to roots are followed by a hyphen juncture.
- Roots: the most part are monosyllabic and with the shape CVC or CVꞏC. Two important processes are root derivation and reduplication.
- Suffixes
  - Root-deriving suffixes (suffixes added to the root): distributive, repetitive, iterative, transitive, stative, privative.
  - Stem suffixes (added to the stem form):
  - Imperative Stem Suffixation
  - 1 position class derivation class=patient suffix, comitative suffix, generic comitative suffix
  - 2 position class: reflexive
  - 3 position class: causative
  - 4 position class: reciprocal, benefactive
  - 1 position class inflectional suffixes=warning, passive
  - 2 position class. Inflectional =inevitable future, potential temporal simultaneity, jussive, hortative
  - 3 position class= negative, dual hortative, necessary temporal anteriority, impersonal interrogative, temporal simultaneity or anteriority, personal object
  - Indicative Stem Suffixation
  - 1 position inflectional suffixes:non visual sensory evidential, hearsay evidential, inferential evidential, experiential evidential, subordinating causal anteriority, approximation
  - 2 position inflectional suffixes:first person, second person, dubitative, completive, subordinating temporal anteriority, subordinating unexpected simultaneity

== Syntax ==
The basic word order in Wintu is very flexible. A morphological word is the basic syntactical unit. In some cases a morphological word that is phonemically a single word can be syntactically two different words. A morphological word can be clitic or non-clitic. The clitic word is always dependent on the non-clitic. The clitic words can be proclitic and postclitic depending on their position. Some morphemic words can be both clitics and full words. For example: the morphemic word /ʔel/, in, is both a full word in /qewelʔel/, in the house, and a proclitic in /ʔel-qewel/, which has the same meaning. The largest syntactic unit is the sentence. Sentences are considered a sequence of full words terminated by a period juncture /./. The sentence can be considered a clause if it contains verbs, a sentence if it contains nouns. Sentences never contain main verbs. Clauses can be dependent or independent. This depends on the kind of suffix that forms the verb. Independent verbs take the personal inflectional suffixes while dependent verbs are characterised by the subordinating suffixes {r}, {tan}, {ʔa}, {n}, {so}, and {ta}. In the sentences the syntactic relationships between full words and clitics are indicated by the word order and by the inflectional and derivational suffixes. Four types of functions can be distinguished for the sentences: head, attributive, satellite, and conjunction. The head is usually a noun and it is not dependent on other forms as for example /winthu/ Wintu people. The attributive precedes and modifies the head as for example in /winthuꞏn qewelin/ in a Wintu house. On the other hand, the satellite only occurs in clauses. A satellite could be either the subject or the object of a verb. If the satellite is the subject of the verb, it precedes the verb, as for example /poꞏm yel-hura/ land destroyed, but if the satellite is the object and it is in a dependent clause or a noun-phrase containing a genitive attributive, it follows. For example: /sedet ʔelew'kiyemtiꞏn/ coyote never speaks wisely, or /wayda meꞏm hina/ a northern flood of water (will) arrive.

== See also ==
- Wintuan languages
- Wintu

== Bibliography ==
- Golla, Victor (2011). California Indian languages. Berkeley: University of California Press. ISBN 978-0-520-26667-4.
- Pitkin, Harvey (1963). Wintu Grammar. University of California, Berkeley.
- Pitkin, Harvey (1984). Wintu Grammar. Berkeley: University of California Press. ISBN 978-0-520-09612-7.
- Pitkin, Harvey (1985). Wintu Dictionary. Berkeley: University of California Press. ISBN 978-0-520-09613-4.
- Shepherd, Alice (1989). Wintu Texts. Berkeley: University of California Press. ISBN 978-0-520-09748-3.
- Schlichter, Alice (1981). Wintu dictionary. Reports of the Survey of California and Other Indian Languages.
