= Wintun =

Indigenous peoples of Northern California

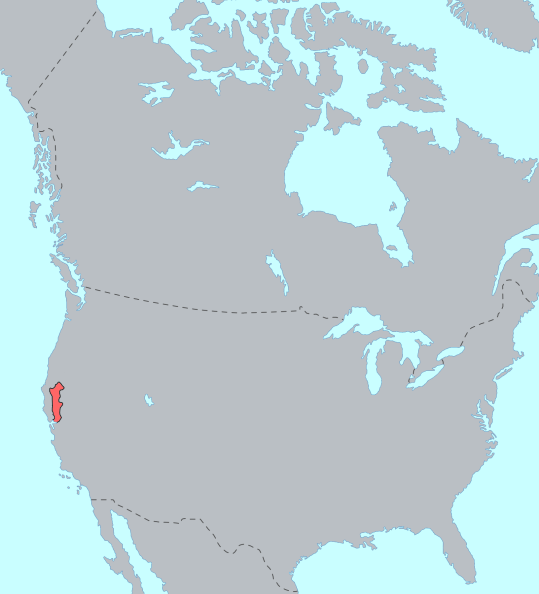
- Pre-contact distribution of Wintun peoples

Total population
- 2,500

Regions with significant populations
- United States ( California)

Languages
- English, Wintun languages

Religion
- Roundhouse religion, Christianity

The Wintun are members of several related Native American peoples of Northern California, including the Wintu (northern), Nomlaki (central), and Patwin (southern). Their range is from approximately present-day Lake Shasta to San Francisco Bay, along the western side of the Sacramento River to the Coast Range. Each of these tribes speak one of the Wintuan languages. Linguistic and archaeological evidence suggests that the Wintun people probably entered the California area around 500 AD from what is now southern Oregon, introducing bow and arrow technology to the region (Golla 2011: 205). There has been carbon dating of several artifacts by UC Berkeley that dates back to around 10,000 years, and several of these artifacts have now been repatriated. Despite being a major influence on the region's history, there is still very little history on the Wintu due to centuries of genocide and displacement that still occur today along with continued destruction of sacred ceremonial and religious sites, often due to companies that ignore legal or ethical considerations.

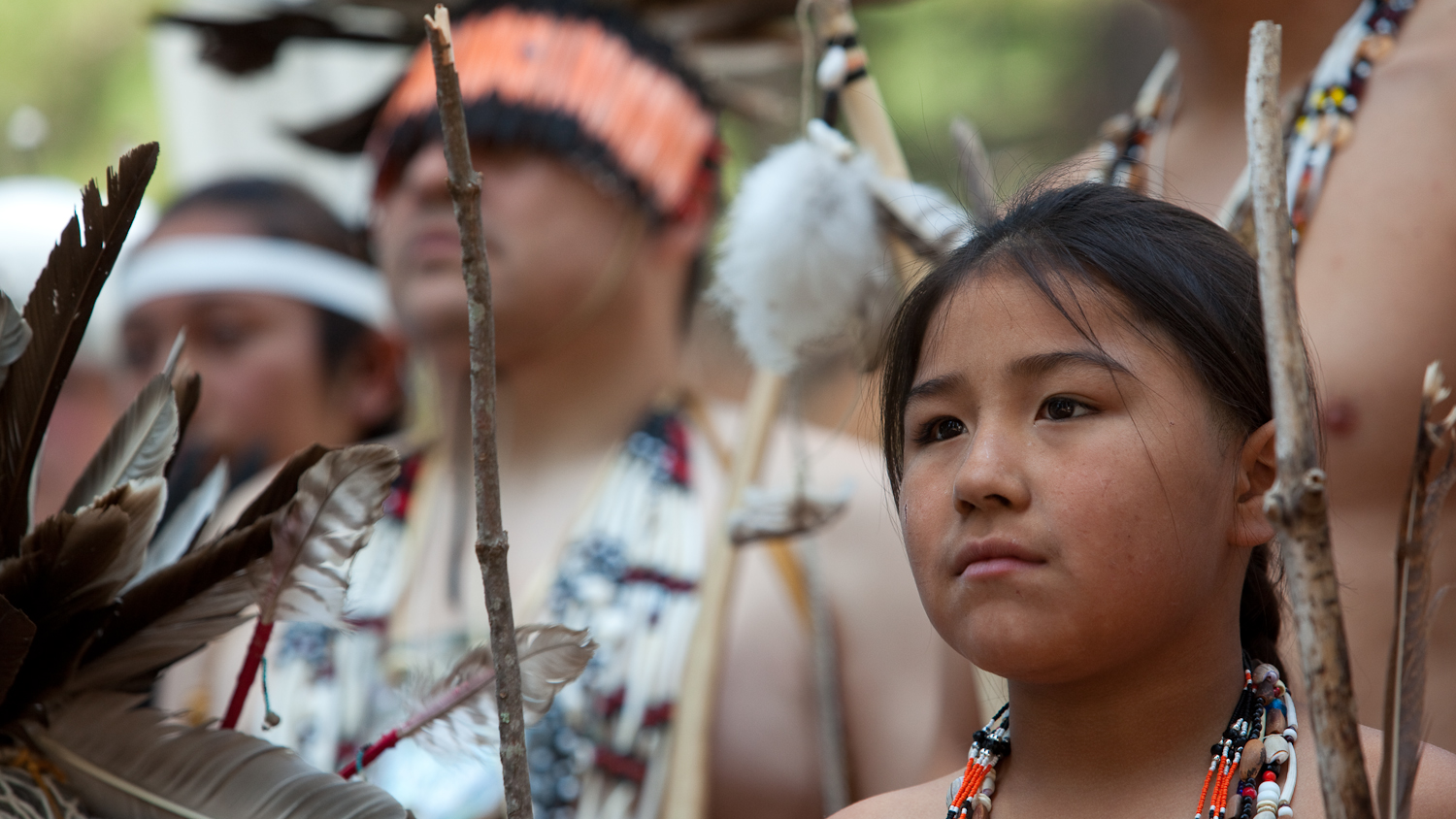
Wintu Dancers

== Federally recognized Wintun tribes ==
- Cachil DeHe Band of Wintun Indians of the Colusa Indian Community of the Colusa Rancheria
- Grindstone Indian Rancheria of Wintun-Wailaki Indians
- Kletsel Dehe Wintun Nation, formerly known as the Cortina Indian Rancheria
- Paskenta Band of Nomlaki Indians
- Redding Rancheria
- Round Valley Indian Tribes of the Round Valley Reservation
- Yocha Dehe Wintun Nation, formerly known as the Rumsey Indian Rancheria of Wintun Indians

== See also ==
- Wintu-Nomlaki traditional narratives
- Patwin traditional narratives
- Patwin
- Patwin language
- Wyntoon
