= Wintuan languages =

Language family of Northern California, US

Wintun
- Copeh
- Geographic distribution: California
- Ethnicity: Wintun people
- Extinct: 2018, withe the death of Bertha Wright Mitchell (Patwin)
- Linguistic classification: Penutian ?: Wintun
- Proto-language: Proto-Wintuan
- Subdivisions: Wintu–Nomlaki (†); Patwin (†?)

Language codes
- Glottolog: wint1258
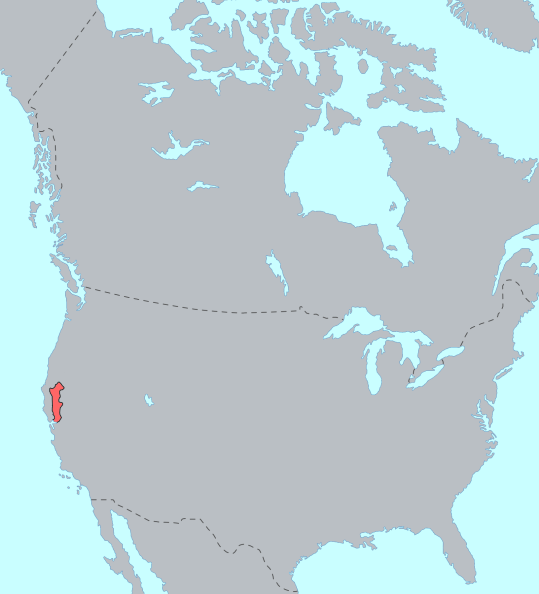
- Pre-contact distribution of Wintuan languages

Wintuan (also Wintun, Wintoon, Copeh, Copehan) is an extinct family of languages spoken in the Sacramento Valley of central Northern California. The languages in the family are known essentially only from archival data.

== Classification ==
=== Family division ===
William F. Shipley listed three Wintuan languages in his encyclopedic overview of California Indian languages. More recently, Marianne Mithun split Southern Wintuan into a Patwin language and a Southern Patwin language, resulting in the following classification.

- Wintuan
  - Northern Wintuan
    - † Wintu (a.k.a. Wintu proper, Northern Wintu)
    - † Nomlaki (a.k.a. Noamlakee, Central Wintu)
  - Southern Wintuan
    - † Patwin (a.k.a. Patween)
    - † Southern Patwin

Wintu became dormant with the death of the last fluent speaker in 2003. As of 2010, Nomlaki has at least one partial speaker. Patwin became dormant in 2018, though a speaker was still reported in 2021. Southern Patwin, once spoken by the Suisun local tribe just northeast of San Francisco Bay, became extinct in the early 20th century and is thus poorly known. Wintu proper is the best documented of the four Wintuan languages.

Pitkin estimated that the Wintuan languages were about as close to each other as the Romance languages. They may have diverged from a common tongue only 2,000 years ago. A comparative study including a reconstruction of Proto-Wintuan phonology, morphology and lexicon was undertaken by Shepherd.

=== Possible relations to external language families ===
The Wintuan family is usually considered to be a member of the hypothetical Penutian language phylum and was one of the five branches of the original California kernel of Penutian proposed by Roland B. Dixon and Alfred L. Kroeber. However, recent studies suggest that the Wintuans independently entered California about 1,500 years ago from an earlier location somewhere in Oregon. The Wintuan pronominal system closely resembles that of Klamath, while there are numerous lexical resemblances between Northern Wintuan and Alsea that appear to be loans.

== Bibliography ==
- DeLancey, Scott; Golla, Victor (1997). "The Penutian hypothesis: Retrospect and prospect". International Journal of American Linguistics. 63: 171–202. doi:10.1086/466318.
- Dixon, Roland B.; Kroeber, Alfred L. (1913a). "New linguistic families in California". American Anthropologist. 15 (4): 647–655. doi:10.1525/aa.1913.15.4.02a00050.
- Dixon, Roland B.; Kroeber, Alfred L. (1913b). "Relationship of the Indian languages of California". Science. 37 (945): 225. Bibcode:1913Sci....37..225D. doi:10.1126/science.37.945.225. PMID 17796266.
- Golla, Victor (1997). "The Alsea-Wintu connection". International Journal of American Linguistics. 63: 157–170. doi:10.1086/466317.
- Golla, Victor (2007). "Linguistic Prehistory". In Jones, Terry L.; Klar, Kathryn A. (eds.). California Prehistory: Colonization, Culture, and Complexity. New York: Altamira Press. pp. 71–82. ISBN 978-0-7591-0872-1.
- Golla, Victor (2011). California Indian languages. Berkeley: University of California Press. ISBN 978-0-520-26667-4.
- Liedtke, Stefan (2007). The Relationship of Wintuan to Plateau Penutian. LINCOM studies in Native American linguistics. Vol. 55. Munich: Lincom Europa. ISBN 978-3-89586-357-8.
- Mithun, Marianne (1999). The languages of Native North America. Cambridge: Cambridge University Press. ISBN 0-521-23228-7.
- Pitkin, Harvey (1984). Wintu grammar. University of California publications in linguistics. Vol. 94. Berkeley: University of California Press. ISBN 0-520-09612-6.
- Shepherd, Alice (2006). Proto-Wintun. University of California publications in linguistics. Vol. 137. Berkeley: University of California Press.
- Shipley, William F. (1978). "Native Languages of California". In Sturtevant, William C.; Heizer, Robert F. (eds.). Handbook of North American Indians. Vol. 8: California. Washington, DC: Smithsonian Institution. pp. 80–90. ISBN 0-16-004578-9.
