= Suisun =

Suisun may refer to:

== People ==
- Suisun people

== Places ==
- Suisun Bay
- Suisun City, California
  - Suisun–Fairfield station
- Suisun Marsh
- Suisun Valley AVA, wine region

== Ships ==
- USS Suisun
