= Reportedly haunted locations in the San Francisco Bay Area =

Allegedly haunted sites

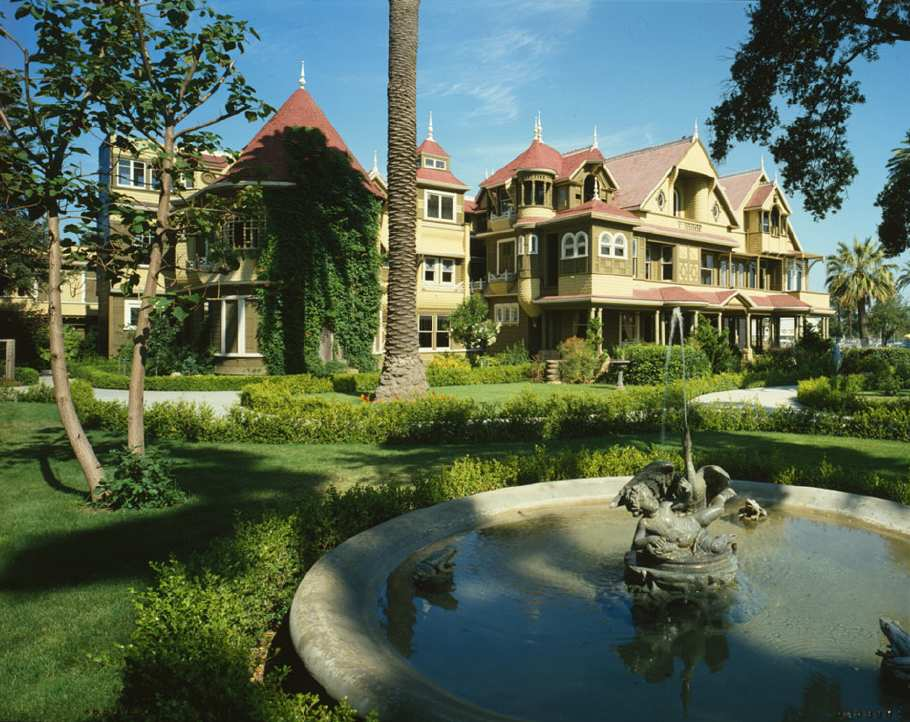
Winchester House, a museum

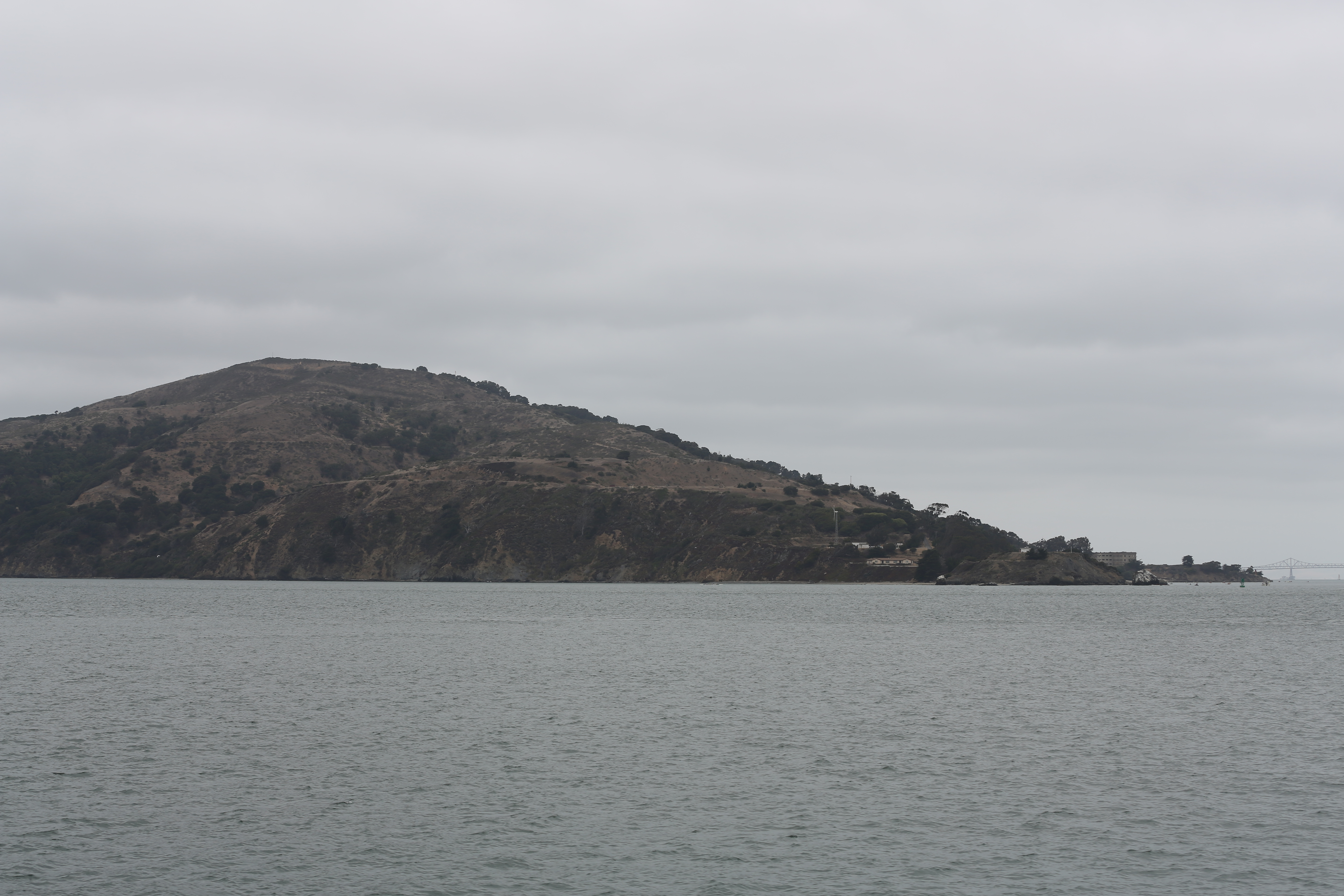
Angel Island

There are many reportedly haunted locations in San Francisco, California. According to ghost hunters, over 100 sites in the San Francisco Bay Area are reported to be haunted.

== San Francisco ==
Russian Hill

Manrow’s House, was built in 1851 by J.P. Marrow, a successful civil engineer and also a judge advocate of a vigilance committee with high reputation in the city. He reported paranormal activities at his house in the form of “visitations, table tapping, rapping and so forth”. These accounts were published in newspapers of San Francisco.

The Richmond

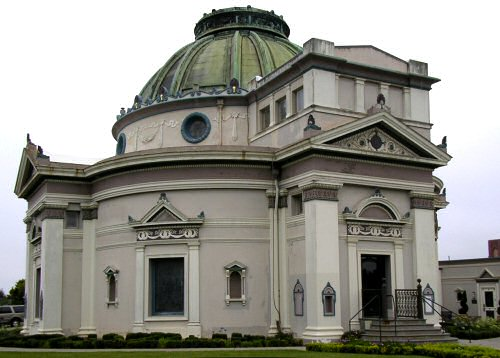
Neptune Society Columbarium

The Neptune Society Columbarium, at One Loraine Court, was originally part of the Odd Fellows Cemetery.

Room 410 at the Queen Anne Hotel is said to be haunted by the namesake of the Miss Mary Lake's School for Girls.

== San Francisco Bay ==
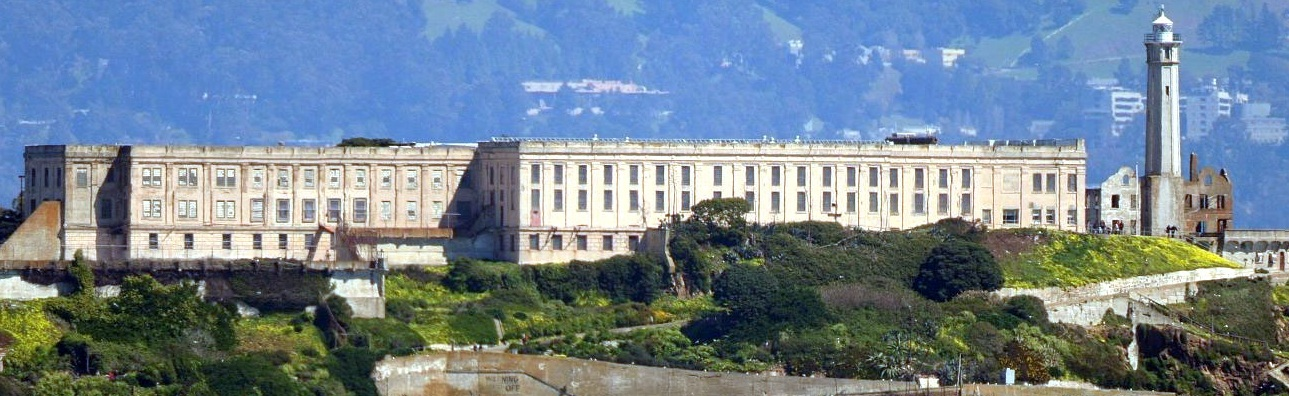
Alcatraz Federal Penitentiary

Alcatraz Island

Alcatraz Island and Alcatraz Federal Penitentiary are rumored to be haunted. The Huffington Post included it in a Halloween article list of "spooky places".

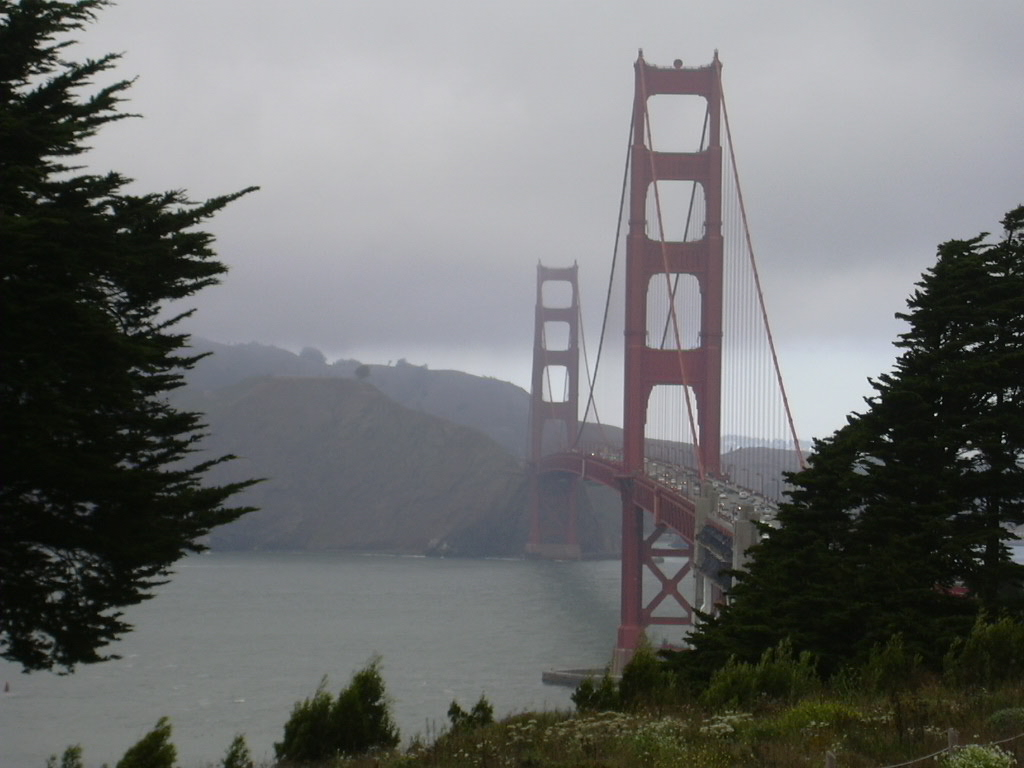
Golden Gate Bridge

Golden Gate Bridge

Over 1000 people have committed suicide by jumping off the Golden Gate Bridge, resulting in claims of it being haunted.

== Napa County ==
According to ghost hunters, Greenwood Mansion, between Napa and American Canyon, is reputedly haunted by its former owner John Greenwood and his wife who were murdered there in 1891.

== Solano County ==
The ground of an old village where the Spanish forces had killed many Patwin is part of Rockville Hills Regional Park. Local people reported seeing a “partial apparition of Chief Solano”

== In fiction ==
Mark Twain and Ambrose Bierce set ghost stories in San Francisco in the 19th century. The ghost incidents narrated are of the 1850s to 1950s set here are in the genre of stories, journalistic articles or based on investigations into the incidents. Some of the references have been sourced to books in the San Francisco Public Library, books such as “Haunted Houses of California” and the story of San Francisco Art Institute by Antoinette May, the "Vanishing Hitchhiker" by Rose Robinson, and “Foot Steps in the Fog : Alfred Hitchcocks San Francisco” authored by Jeff Craft and Aaron Leventhol.
