= Solano (surname) =

Solano is a Spanish surname. Notable people with the surname include:

- Adrián Solano (born 1951), Costa Rican cyclist
- Adrián Solano (cross-country skier) (born 1994), Venezuelan cross-country skier
- Agustina Solano (born 1995), Chilean field hockey player
- Álvaro Solano (born 1961), Costa Rican footballer
- Andrés Felipe Solano (born 1977), Colombian writer
- Andrés Solano (born 1998), Colombian footballer
- Bastián Solano Molina (born 1999), Chilean footballer
- Carlos Solano (born c. 1950), Costa Rican footballer
- Chief Solano (c. 1798 – c. 1851), or Sem-Yeto, American Indian leader
- Donovan Solano (born 1987), Colombian baseball player
- Francisco Solano (disambiguation), several people with this name
- Francisco Solano López (1928– 2011), Argentine comics artist
- Gabriel Solano (born 1974), Argentine politician
- Gelvis Solano (born 1994), Dominican basketball player
- Gerardo Solano (1954–2000), Costa Rican footballer
- Greg Solano (born 1963), American sheriff and politician
- Hernán Solano (born 1967), Costa Rican politician
- Humberto Solano (1944–2010), Costa Rican cyclist
- Jasmine Solano, American musician and disc jockey
- Jhonatan Solano (born 1985), Colombian baseball player
- Joan Solano (born 1953), Spanish rower
- Joaquín Solano (1913–2003), Mexican equestrian
- Johanna Solano (born 1990), Costa Rican beauty queen
- Jorge Solano Moreta, Puerto Rican drug trafficker
- José Solano (disambiguation), several people with this name
- José Antonio Solano (born 1985), Spanish footballer
- Juan Solano (1504–1580), Spanish missionary
- Juan Manuel Solano (born 1993), Colombian footballer
- Juan Miguel Solano, Spanish actor
- Julio Solano (born 1960), Dominican baseball pitcher
- Marta Eugenia Solano Arias, Costa Rican lawyer and political scientist
- Mateus Solano (born 1981), Brazilian actor
- Miguel Solano (born 1946), Spanish rower
- Naren Solano (born 1996), Colombian footballer
- Nolberto Solano (born 1974), Peruvian footballer
- Rafael Solano (born 1931), Dominican pianist, songwriter and ambassador to UNESCO
- Rosalío Solano (1914–2009), Mexican cinematographer
- Salomón Solano (born 1985), Mexican gridiron football player
- Solita Solano (1888–1975), or Sarah Wilkinson, American journalist
- Susana Solano (born 1946), Spanish sculptor
- Vicente Solano Lima (1901–1984), Argentine newspaper publisher and politician
- Vincent Solano (1923–1992), American gangster
- Wes Solano (born c. 1970), or Jorge Solano Moreta, Puerto Rican drug trafficker
- Wilebaldo Solano (1916–2010), Spanish Communist activist

== See also ==
- Solano (disambiguation)
- José Solano y Bote (1726–1806), Spanish naval officer
