= San Francisco Solano (disambiguation) =

San Francisco Solano is a city in Buenos Aires Province, Argentina.

San Francisco Solano may also refer to:

- Mission San Francisco Solano, a Spanish mission in Alta California
- Mission San Francisco Solano (Mexico), a Spanish mission in Coahuila, Mexico

== See also ==
- Solano (disambiguation)
- Francisco Solano (disambiguation)
