= Francisco Solano =

Francisco Solano may refer to:

- Francis Solanus, also known as Father Francisco Solano, Franciscan missionary and Saint
- Chief Solano, also known as Sem-Yeto, a Chief of the Suisunes Tribe of California
- Mission San Francisco Solano, mission built in 1843 in the town of Sonoma, California
- Mission San Francisco Solano (Mexico), mission built in 1700 in Coahuila, Mexico
- Francisco Solano Asta-Buruaga y Cienfuegos, Chilean politician
- Francisco Solano López (1928– 2011), Argentine comics artist
- Francisco Solano Patiño (1923–1990), Paraguayan footballer
- Francisco Solano (Spanish writer), born 1952
- Francisco Solano (soldier) (1768–1808), Spanish general of the War of the Pyrenees

== See also ==
- Solano (surname)
