= Solano =

Solano may refer to:

== Places ==
- California State Prison, Solano
- Mission San Francisco Solano, a historical Spanish mission in Alta California
- Mission San Francisco Solano (Mexico), a historical Spanish mission in Coahuila, Mexico
- Solano, Buenos Aires, a town in Greater Buenos Aires, Argentina
- Solano Avenue, a street in Berkeley and Albany, California, in the United States
- Solano castle, a colonial castle in Puerto Cabello, Venezuela
- Solano County, California, in the United States
- Solano, Caquetá, Colombia
- Solano, Chiriquí, a corregimiento in Bugaba District, Panama
- Solano, New Mexico
- Solano, Nueva Vizcaya, a municipality in the Philippines

== People ==
- Solano (surname)
- Chief Solano (1798–1851), American Indian leader
- Solano people, a people on the Texas-Coahuila border between the United States and Mexico
  - Solano language, a little-known extinct language spoken by the Solano people
- Solano Trindade (1908–1974), Brazilian poet, folklorist, and artist

== Other ==
- Solano (ferry), a large railroad ferry in service 1879–1930 between Benicia and Port Costa, California
- Solano (wind), an eastern wind in Spain
