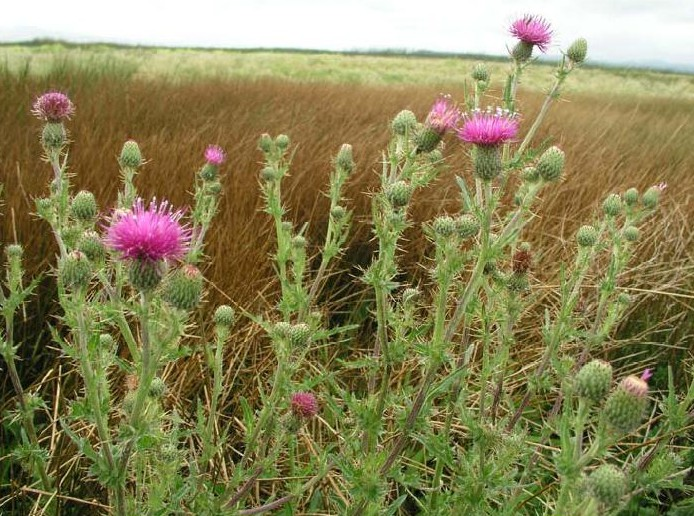
- Suisun thistle

Conservation status
- Critically Imperiled (NatureServe)

Scientific classification
- Kingdom: Plantae
- Clade: Tracheophytes
- Clade: Angiosperms
- Clade: Eudicots
- Clade: Asterids
- Order: Asterales
- Family: Asteraceae
- Genus: Cirsium
- Species: C. hydrophilum

Binomial name
- Cirsium hydrophilum (Greene) Jeps.

Synonyms
- Carduus hydrophilus Greene; Cirsium vaseyi var. hydrophilum (Greene) Petr.; Cirsium montigenum Petr.; Cirsium vaseyi (A.Gray) Jeps.; Cnicus breweri var. vaseyi A.Gray

= Cirsium hydrophilum =

Species of thistle

Cirsium hydrophilum is a species of thistle which is endemic to California, where it is found only in the San Francisco Bay Area and the Sacramento-San Joaquin River Delta. This native thistle grows in wet boggy habitats.

== Description ==
Cirsium hydrophilum may reach 2 metres (6.6 ft) in height with a branching, cobwebby stem. The leaves are longest near the base of the plant, approaching 90 centimetres (35 in) in length. They are cut into toothed lobes and covered in spines, particularly along the petiole.

The inflorescence bears one or more flower heads, each up to 3 centimetres (1.2 in) long. The head is lined with sticky, twisted, spiny phyllaries and contains pink to purple flowers. The fruit is an achene a 2–4 millimetres (0.079–0.157 in) long topped with a pappus of about 1.5 centimetres (0.59 in) centimeters.

=== Varieties ===
There are two very localized varieties:

- The rare Cirsium hydrophilum var. hydrophilum, the Suisun thistle, is known from two occurrences in the Suisun Marsh, in the salt marsh habitat of the Delta in Solano County. It is treated as a federally listed endangered species.
- The very rare Cirsium hydrophilum var. vaseyi, Mt. Tamalpais thistle or Vasey's thistle, is known from about twenty occurrences on Mount Tamalpais in Marin County, in Vacaville, California in Solano County, and inside the Presidio in the City of San Francisco. It is currently not a listed federal or state endangered species.
