= José Solano =

José Solano may refer to:

- José Solano (actor) (born 1971), American actor
- José Solano y Bote (1726–1806), Spanish naval officer
- José Solano, executive producer of the Mexican television soap opera Bellezas Indomables

== See also ==
- Solano (surname)
