= Liwaito =

Liwaito may refer to:

- Liwaito, California
- Putah Creek, Liwaito in the native language
