= Rockville, California =

Unincorporated community in California, United States

- Unincorporated community
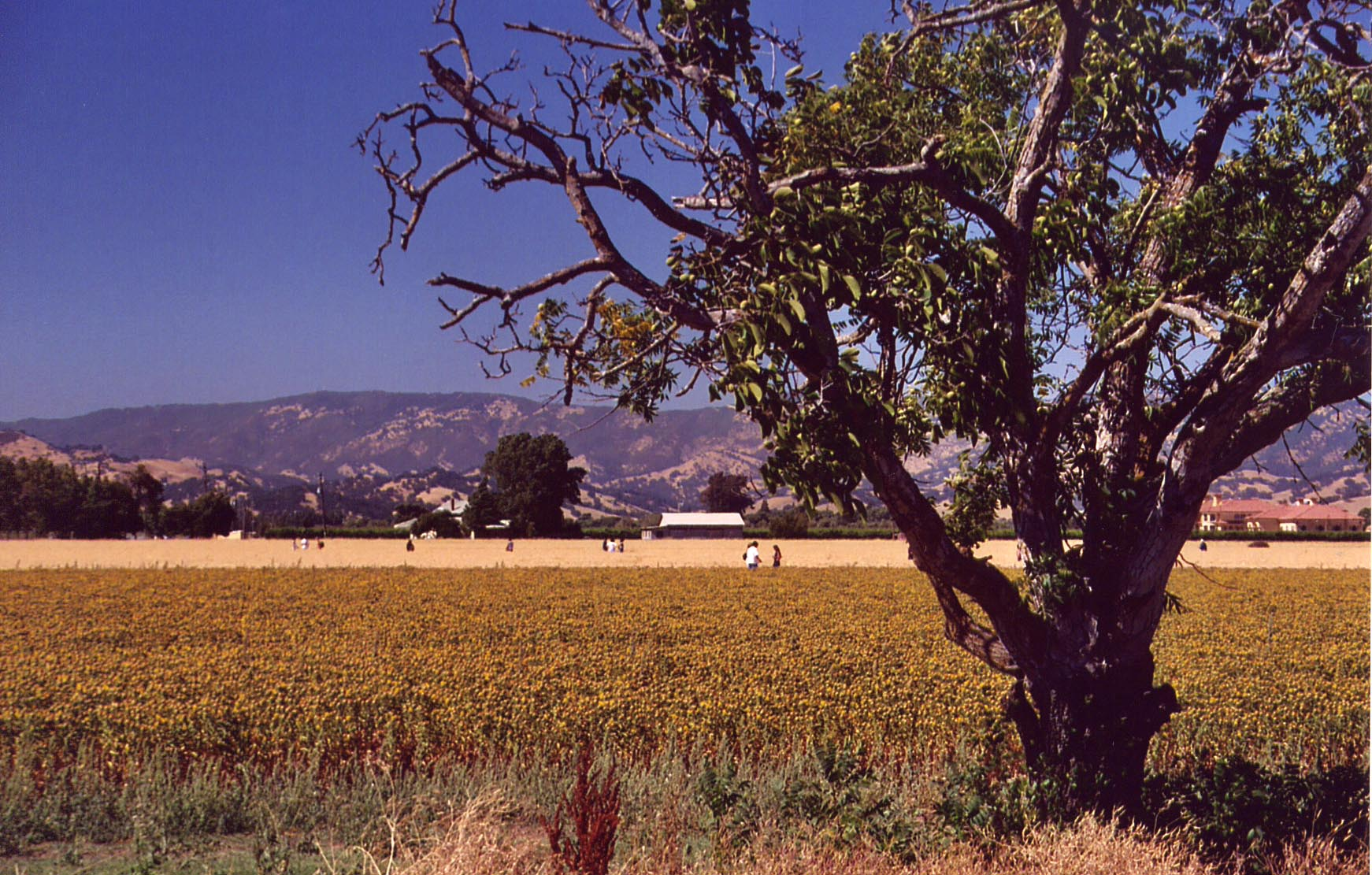
- Field in Rockville

- location in California
- Coordinates: 38°14′39″N 122°07′20″W
- Country: United States
- State: California
- County: Solano

Government
  - County Board: Wanda Williams
  - State Senator: Christopher Cabaldon (D)
  - California Assemblymembers: Cecilia Aguiar-Curry (D) and Lori Wilson (D)
  - U. S. Rep.: Kevin Kiley (I)

Population (2000)
  - Total: 130
- Time zone: UTC-8 (PST)
  - Summer (DST): UTC-7 (PDT)
- ZIP code: 94534
- Area code: 707

Rockville is a small unincorporated community in northern-central Solano County, California, United States, southwest of Fairfield and closest to Cordelia.

Yulyul, the main village of the Suisunes (a Patwin people of the Suisun Bay region), is believed to have stood where Rockville is located today.

The main economic activities are farming, tourism, and the large regional Rockville Cemetery.

== Tourism ==
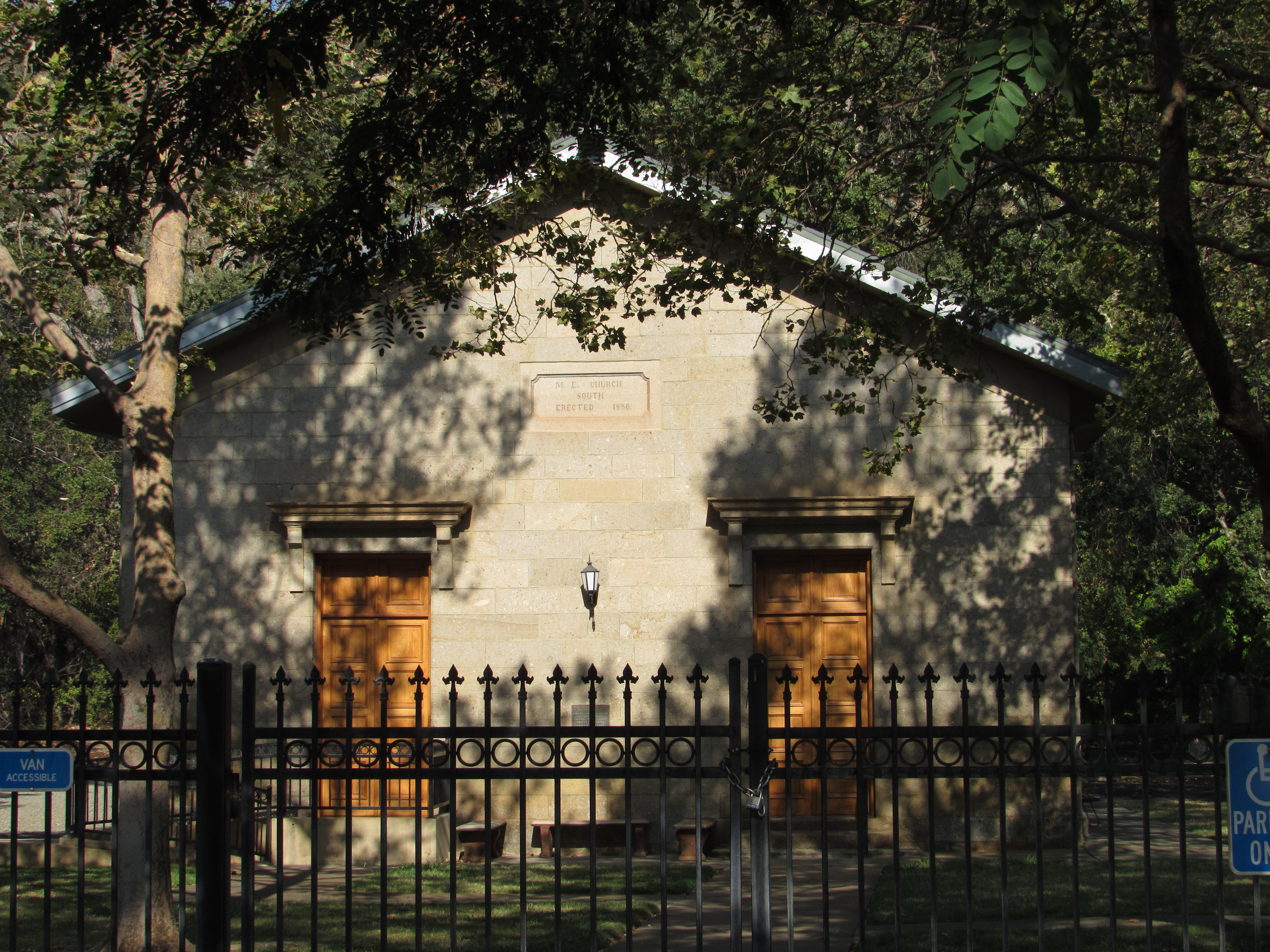
Rockville Stone Chapel - California registered landmark number 779 in Rockville, California

Rockville is the home of the Rockville Hills Regional Park, consisting of 633 acres of grasslands and oak woodlands, with a dense mixed broadleaf forest through which there are many hiking and biking trails.

== Demographics ==
Historical population
Census	Pop.	Note	%±
2020	347		—

The 2020 United States census reported Cordelia had a population of 347.

Rockville, California – Racial and ethnic composition Note: the US Census treats Hispanic/Latino as an ethnic category. This table excludes Latinos from the racial categories and assigns them to a separate category. Hispanics/Latinos may be of any race.
Race / Ethnicity (NH = Non-Hispanic)	Pop 2020	% 2020
White alone (NH)	228	65.7%
Black or African American alone (NH)	7	2.0%
Asian alone (NH)	27	7.8%
Other race alone (NH)	1	0.3%
Mixed race or Multiracial (NH)	23	6.6%
Hispanic or Latino (any race)	61	17.5%
Total	347	100.0%
