= Greg Solano =

American sheriff

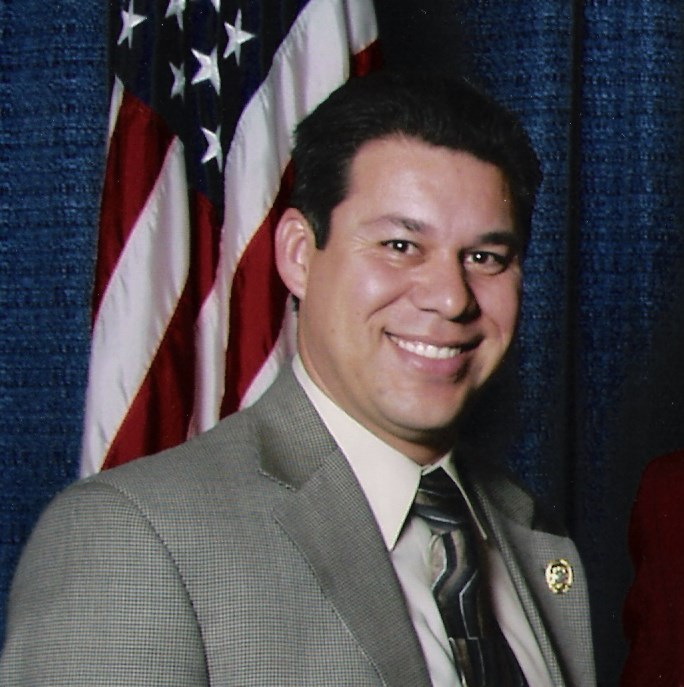
- Santa Fe County Sheriff Greg L. Solano

Personal details
- Born: November 15, 1963 (age 62) Santa Fe, New Mexico, U.S.
- Party: Democratic
- Spouse: Antoinette Mares Solano
- Occupation: Sheriff

Greg Solano (born November 15, 1963) is an American politician and law enforcement officer who was elected sheriff of Santa Fe County, New Mexico, in 2002, after leaving the Santa Fe City Police Department as a sergeant. Solano ran unsuccessfully for Lieutenant Governor of New Mexico in the 2010 primary election under the Democratic Party. Solano served nearly eight years as sheriff before resigning one month before his term was to end.

== Early and personal life ==
Greg Solano was born November 15, 1963, in Santa Fe, New Mexico. He married Antoinette Solano on May 19, 1984; they have two children and six grandchildren. Antoinette was a former employee of the State of New Mexico. Antoinette and Greg worked together in the self storage industry. On June 24, 2021, Antoinette died from a heart attack.

Greg Solano is also a prolific woodworker using CNC, woodturning, and traditional furniture making in his art.

== Political career ==
Solano was a former President of the Santa Fe Police Officers Association, the city's police union. During his presidency, the union became the first certified and recognized City of Santa Fe Union. He lost re-election as president in 1994 after Mayor Debbie Jaramillo appointed a controversial black police chief Don Grady. He was caught in between union members who wanted the chief removed and those who felt the fight for removal was racist in nature. He lost the election to the pro-removal faction. He then left the police department in 1994 and first ran for sheriff in 1998, losing to then Under Sheriff Ray Sisneros by a slim margin.

In 2002, Solano ran again for sheriff against a field of two other Democrats and one Republican. After winning a close primary in June, he went on to win 70% of the vote in the November general election.

As sheriff, he raised deputy pay by 21%; in doing so, he stopped a flood of deputies leaving for other departments and contributed to filling often-vacant positions. Solano also fought for privatized adult and juvenile jails to return to public control, ending the county's association with private companies. The fight over removing private companies from running the jail created conflict with the County Commission, which was skeptical of government control of the jail and juvenile facilities. After the county took control, the Commission voted to remove the Sheriff's Office's authority over the jail and juvenile facilities. Solano was involved in a settlement agreement with the United States Department of Justice over complaints and deficiencies found in audits of the adult facility prior to his administration.

Solano also took on drunk driving issues when he fought for local ordinances allowing for the seizure and auctioning of repeat offenders' automobiles and the placement of breath test machines in local liquor establishments. His most controversial idea was to post repeat offenders' information and photos on the Sheriff's Office website. Solano later expressed regret over passing legislation to seize vehicles of drunk drivers after the city attempted to seize one of his vehicles when his daughter was arrested in the vehicle. Solano fought the seizure in district court, and the City of Santa Fe returned the vehicle when it appeared the city might lose the case. The City of Santa Fe was in fear that if Solano would win the case, the entire seizure program could be ruled illegal; rather than face the possibility of losing the program altogether, the city attorney dismissed the seizure case.

In September 2005, Solano announced his re-election bid for the office of Sheriff in the June 2006 Democratic primary. The Santa Fe Reporter wrote a cover story on his life, "Behind the Badge," which was published on May 3, 2006. In June 2006, Sheriff Solano handily won re-election with 64% of the vote. He was challenged by one of his deputies who ran an increasingly negative campaign. Sheriff Solano began his second four-year term on January 1, 2007, having no Republican opponent in the general election. The Sheriff's Office is term limited, with only two consecutive four-year terms allowed.

On August 27, 2008, Sheriff Solano announced he would run for Lieutenant Governor of New Mexico in the 2010 primary election under the Democratic Party. In January 2010, Solano dropped his bid for Lieutenant Governor, citing fundraising difficulties.

== Embezzlement and resignation ==
On November 24, 2010, Solano resigned as Sheriff of Santa Fe County after admitting to selling police and county property to members of the military on eBay. Solano, saying his family faced financial difficulties, admitted to selling property that included cell phones, flashlights, police belts, holsters, and protective vests. "During the last few years I have taken these vests and sold them online, mostly to military personnel who wanted them for extra protection overseas," Solano said. "This was wrong, illegal, unethical and dishonest." Solano said the body vests he sold were several years old and no longer recommended for use by law enforcement. State police said they have been investigating an embezzlement charge against Solano for the past four months. "I will accept the consequences for my actions. Although my home is threatened with foreclosure and I am now unemployed, I plan to pay back what I took," Solano said. Solano was praised in the media for the way he handled the scandal and for taking immediate responsibility saving taxpayer dollars and resources in the investigation and prosecution.

Robert Garcia, Solano's undersheriff, was sworn in as interim County Sheriff. Garcia was subsequently elected as Sheriff by the citizens of Santa Fe County in the election of November 2, 2011, and began his first term on January 1, 2012.

On July 20, 2011, Solano pleaded guilty in District Court as part of a plea agreement to five counts of fraud for embezzling county property and selling the items for his own gain on eBay. The plea deal came eight months after Solano resigned as sheriff and admitted auctioning the items for personal profit. Solano was sentenced to 3 months in jail and $25,000 restitution as well as five years of probation. Solano was released from jail after 6 weeks with good time. Solano successfully finished his probation in 2016.

== Kidney donation ==
In November 2016, Solano again made local news headlines when he donated a kidney to retired District Court Judge Michael Vigil. Solano said he had known Vigil since he was 20 years old, when Vigil helped him gain custody of his siblings after their mother's death. Vigil, then an attorney, represented Solano on a pro bono basis. Thirty years later, Solano, the only match out of approximately 40 volunteers, donated his kidney in a double surgery at the Mayo Clinic in Phoenix, Arizona. While a few said Solano may be trying to redeem himself in the public eye, Solano said his criminal conviction and the kidney donation were unrelated. "He's a good man," he said of Vigil a day after he was released from the hospital. "I did it for that reason and that reason only. Not to, like, fix my appearance with the community or anything like that."

== Writing ==
Greg Solano is also a writer, with his short story "From Baghdad to Santa Fe" winning second place in a local writing contest. He began work on his first fiction novel in 2005.
