= Suisun people =

Former American Indigenous band in California

Suisun
Total population
- extinct as a band

Regions with significant populations
- Northern California

Languages
- Patwin language

Religion
- Indigenous religion

Related ethnic groups
- other Patwin people

The Suisun, or Suisunes, were a Patwin band of Wintun people. They lived in the Suisun Bay and Suisun Marsh regions of Solano County in Northern California.

Their traditional homelands stretched between what is now Suisun City, Vacaville and Putah Creek around 200 years ago. The Suisun's main village, Yulyul, is believed to be where Rockville, California, is today.

Father Abella, visitor to the tribe in 1811, indicated they resided in the present location of Fairfield, north of the Suisun Bay. One of the Suisun's primary food sources was acorns. Their diet also included fish as well as miner's lettuce. Their huts (as recorded by the Spaniards in 1817) were conical wikiups made of rushes or tule thatch.

== History ==
The Suisun were one band of the Patwin Indians, who were the southern branch of the Wintun group, who had lived in the region for an estimated 4,000 years. Few records have been handed down; approximately 2,500 to 5,000 Patwins existed in the 18th century.

=== Mission era ===
By 1800, Spain had taken control of most of the Bay Area, having erected seven missions in the Ohlone region south and west of the Suisun's region. The closest mission to the Suisun was across the San Francisco Bay, Mission San Francisco de Asís. Franciscan missionaries wanted to bring all tribes into the Spanish-controlled missions, pueblos, and presidios; however, the Spanish had not yet reached north of the present-day Carquinez Strait to the Suisun. The Suisun lived sufficiently far away from the first missions to rebel from the incoming Spaniards, and over time they joined with the other Patwin tribes in the central valley region to resist the incursion on their lands and maintain their freedom. They acquired horses from mission runaways and mission outposts.

The Suisun might have avoided contact for several more decades with the missionaries; however, in the early 19th century, Indian runaways from the missions began to seek shelter with the Suisun. The missions then sent Mission Indians to round up "Christian" runaways. The interaction set in motion a chain of Indian battles and growing distrust.

=== Battles ===
- In 1804, 14 Mission Indians identified as Saclan and Jalquin ventured into the Suisun homeland to recapture mission runaways, and were either killed or died in an unfortunate drowning accident. The facts are unclear. The mission statement of their deaths included this note: "It is not possible to affirm whether they died by drowning or at the hands of the pagans [i.e., the Suisun]... I am inclined to believe they died by drowning. If the pagans [Suisun] had killed them, their relatives would have told me about it."
- By the year 1807, 62 runaways from the missions lived in the regions of Suisun. In February 1807, 40 Mission Indians ventured in Suisun territory looking for January runaways, particularly to reclaim one man's wife. The runaways fought for their freedom, the Suisun defending them. 12 of the attacking Mission Indians died, the rest retreated.
- In May 1810, three more traveling Mission Indians were killed by Suisun. In retribution, the Spaniard Gabriel Moraga led an attack on 125 Suisun and "a fierce battle took place". 125 Suisun men in this battle were driven into three huts and killed. Two huts of men died in battle, one hut was consumed by fire. The soldiers returned to San Francisco with "6 boys and 6 girls of Suisuns and Chupcans."

=== Migration ===
The next year in 1811, perhaps due to the loss of 125 men, a large group of Suisun gave up the resistance and moved into Mission San Francisco de Asís in present-day San Francisco. A total of 326 Suisun were baptized at this mission between 1810 and 1816.

=== Village perishes ===
In 1817, Jose DeArguello, the commandant of the Presidio of San Francisco sent his lieutenant Jose Sanchez to lead another attack against the Suisun tribe, believed to have taken place in the hills behind Benicia. The Spaniards subsequently gained ground in present-day Fairfield and Suisun City today, reaching the Suisun village of Chief Malica, leader of the tribe. At this village, probably with imminent defeat of his people, Chief Malica and the majority of the tribe chose to end their lives in a tragic mass suicide. The Spaniards witnessed the village's brushy huts burst into flames. The chief chanting and singing, leapt into the flames, followed by the people of the village, including the women with children and babies. The Spaniards tried to save some while several Indians fled into the hills. The remaining tribe survived in the hills or through assimilation, reemerging under the leadership of Chief Sem-Yeto, also known as Chief Solano.

=== Era of Chief (Sem-Yeto) Solano (1823–1850s) ===
Sem-Yeto (later known as Chief Solano), born about 1800, emerged as the next in line to be the chief of the next generation of Suisun. Sem-Yeto was described as tall, 6 feet 7 inches, handsome and brave. Sem-Yeto was baptized in the San Francisco Mission in July 1810 at roughly age 10 with the name "Francisco Solano" and lived there until adulthood. He became known as Chief Solano' His baptism took place two months after the tragedy of 1810. Sem-Yeto was possibly captured as a child in Moraga's raid of 1810 or his family brought him within two months of the battle.

In 1823, Sem-Yeto and the Suisun people at Mission San Francisco moved into the new mission in the town of Sonoma, California, the Mission San Francisco de Solano, to help build and populate this final Franciscan mission built north of the San Francisco Bay.

In 1834, General Mariano Guadalupe Vallejo of Sonoma, as the comandante of the new pueblo projects in the region, became a very valuable patron and friend to Chief Solano, and formed an alliance with the Suisun. The mission system was closing down. Chief Solano and the Suisun led many expeditions with the object of quelling the other tribes of the region, particularly "the Wappo, the Satisyomis (aka Sotoyomes, a Wappo tribe) and the Cainameros (aka the Pomo Indians of Cainama in the region toward Santa Rosa)", who were attempting to throw off Mexican domination. Chief Solano eventually helped to secure peace between the region's Native Americans and the Mexicans. A peace treaty was signed in 1836. With the alliance with General Vallejo, the tribe was relatively powerful.

On a political venture, Vallejo even arranged for and sent Chief Solano and 100 warrior Suisun to travel down to Monterey, California to impress and seek military support from Juan Bautista Alvarado, governor of Alta California (1836–1837, 1838–1842).

In 1837, a smallpox epidemic decimated the Indigenous population of the Sonoma region, as well as from other diseases brought in from the Spaniards as well as the Russians at Fort Ross. Chief Solano was one of the few Natives to receive a vaccination.

Chief Solano was also one of a handful of Indigenous Californians to receive a land grant in the mission secularization and parcelling out of Mexican-American lands. The Suisun who survived the epidemic began to earn their livelihoods through farm labor or fishing. Some chose to work as seasonal or year-round ranch labors for Vallejo at the Rancho Petaluma Adobe or other area ranches.

In 1846, at the end of the Bear Flag Revolt when California was ceded to the United States, General Vallejo was taken prisoner by Americans at Sutter's Fort, Sem-Yeto fled north, and the people continued to earn their living on the ranches of California.

== Notable Suisun ==
- Chief Solano

== Namesakes ==
- Solano County is named after Chief (Sem-Yeto) Francisco Solano.
- Suisun City, Suisun Bay, and Suisun Marsh are named after the Suisun band.

== Sources ==
- Fink, Augusta. Monterey, The Presence of the Past. San Francisco, CA: Chronicle Books, 1972. ISBN 978-87-7010-720-4.
- Milliken, Randall. A Time of Little Choice: The Disintegration of Tribal Culture in the San Francisco Bay Area 1769-1910 Menlo Park, CA: Ballena Press Publication, 1995. ISBN 0-87919-132-5 (alk. paper)
- Lewis Pub. A Memorial and Biographical History of Northern California, Chicago, IL: Lewis Publ. Co., 1891. (For post-mission era, intertribal battles)
- Silliman, Stephen. Lost Laborers in Colonial California, Native Americans and the Archaeology of Rancho Petaluma. Tucson, AZ: University of Arizona Press, 2004. ISBN 0-8165-2381-9.
- History of Suisunes "Tragic Demise of People of the West Wind"
- History of Solano County, California
- Sonoma State Historic Park
