= Suisun City, California =

City in the United States

- City
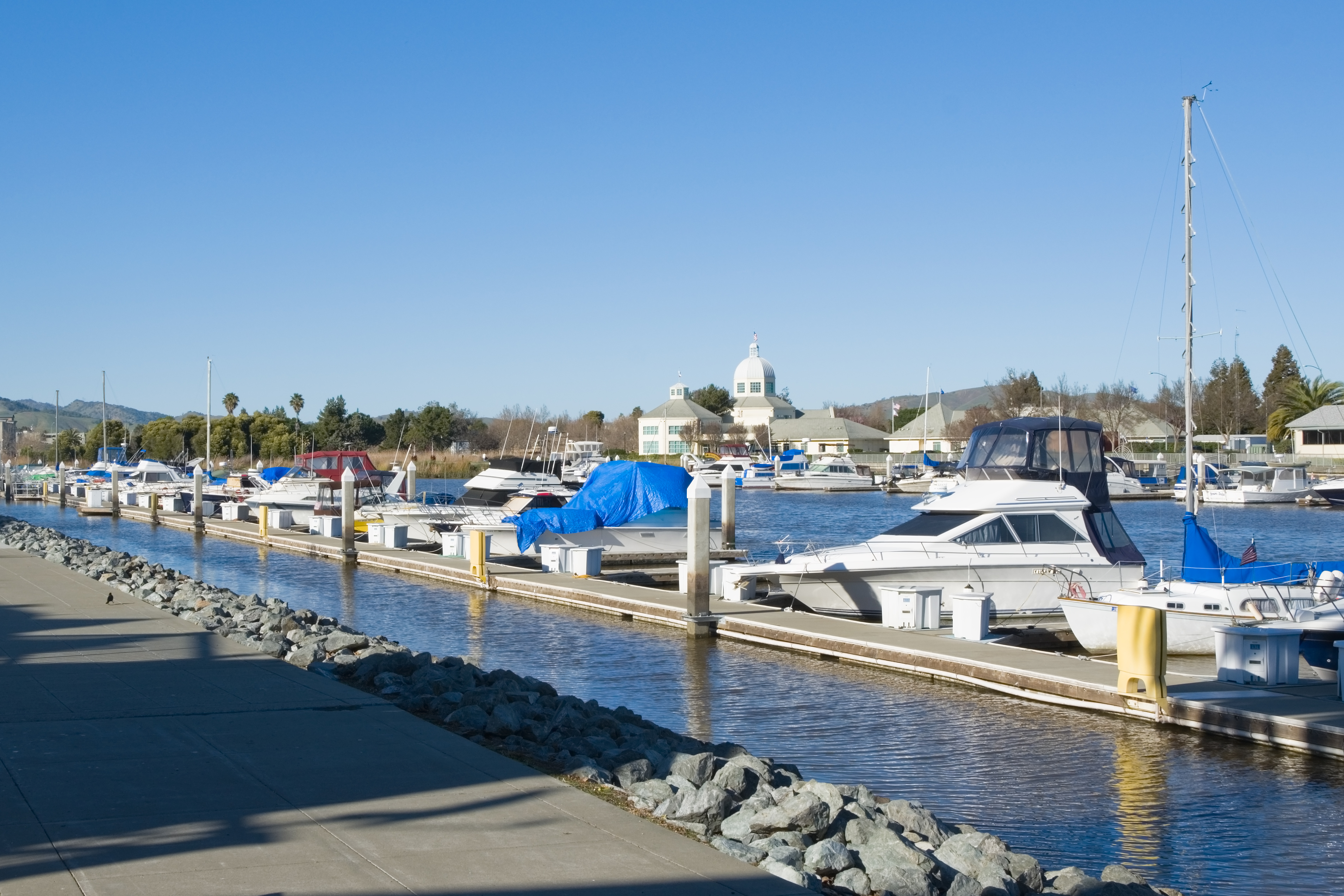
- Suisun City Marina with City Hall in the background

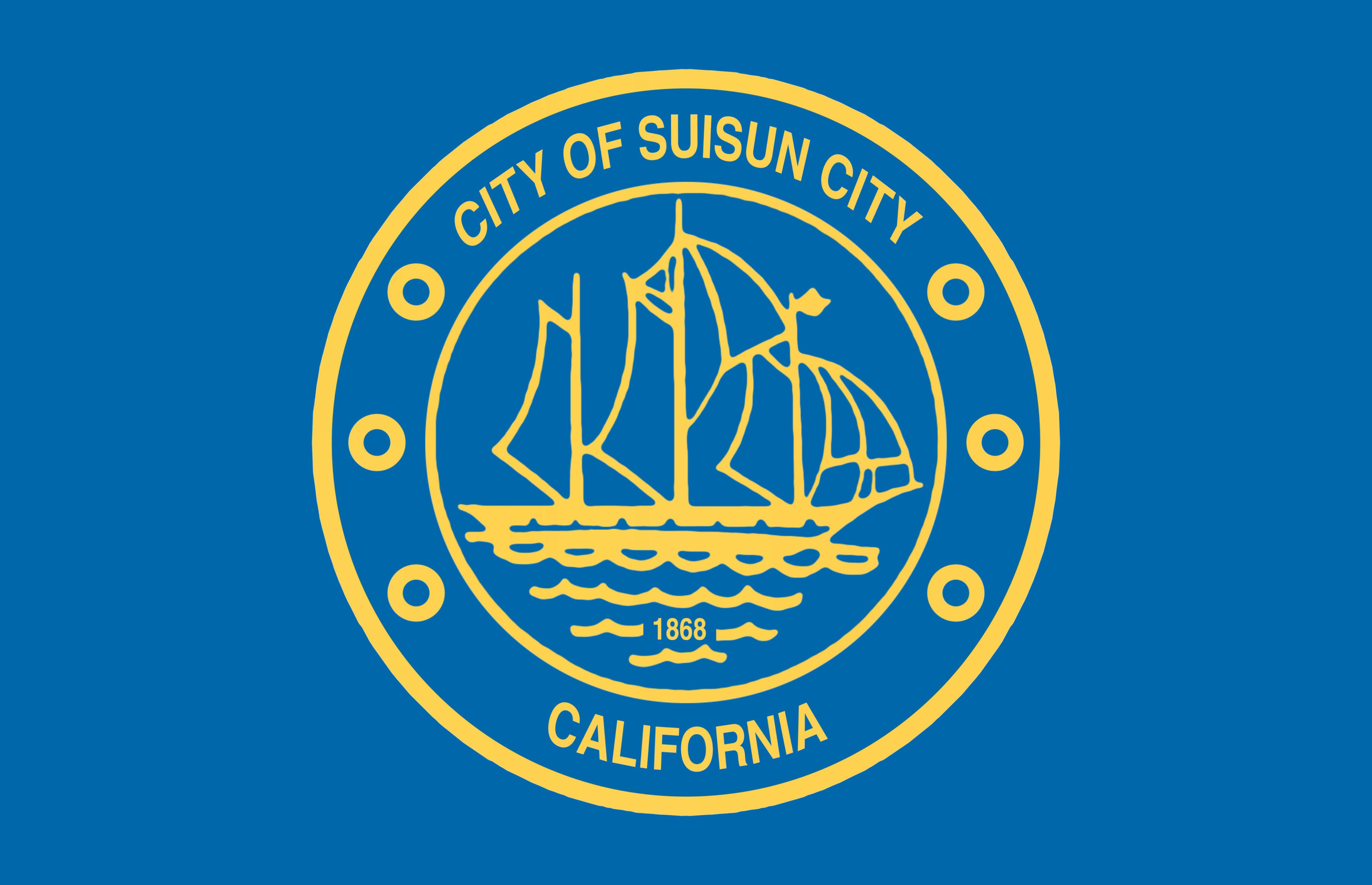
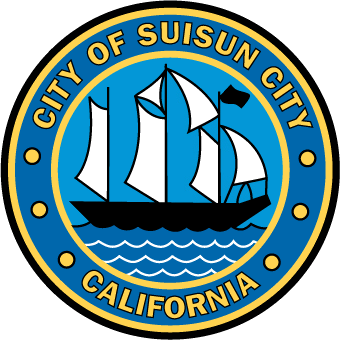
- Flag Seal
- Motto: "Discover The Experience"
- Interactive map of Suisun City, California
- Location in the United States
- Coordinates: 38°14′42″N 122°1′1″W
- Country: United States
- State: California
- County: Solano
- Incorporated: October 9, 1868

Government
  - Type: Council-Manager
  - City council: Mayor Alma Hernandez; Mayor Pro-tem Jenalee Dawson; Princess Washington; Amit Pal; Parise Shepherd
  - State senator: Christopher Cabaldon (D)
  - Assemblymember: Lori Wilson (D)
  - U. S. rep.: John Garamendi (D)

Area
  - Total: 4.07 sq mi (10.53 km^{2})
  - Land: 4.00 sq mi (10.37 km^{2})
  - Water: 0.062 sq mi (0.16 km^{2}) 1.48%
- Elevation: 6.6 ft (2 m)

Population (2020)
  - Total: 29,518
  - Density: 7,370/sq mi (2,845.7/km^{2})
- Time zone: UTC-8 (PST)
  - Summer (DST): UTC-7 (PDT)
- ZIP codes: 94534, 94585
- Area code: 707
- FIPS code: 06-75630
- GNIS feature IDs: 1656340, 2411995
- Website: www.suisun.com

Suisun City (/suːˈsuːn/ soo-SOON; Patwin for "where the west wind blows") is a city in Solano County, California, United States. The population was 29,518 at the 2020 census.

== Etymology ==
The city takes its name from the adjacent Suisun Bay, which in turn is named for the Suisun people, a Native people of the area.

== History ==
Suisun City was established in the 1850s. Its location made it ideal for commerce and transportation during the California Gold Rush.

In 1868—1869, it was connected to the First transcontinental railroad at Sacramento via the California Pacific Railroad (Cal-P) main line, expanding the region's reach across the United States. By 1879 Central Pacific Railroad owned the Cal-P mainline and rerouted the transcontinental overland route through the new branch from Port Costa, via the railroad ferry Solano to Benicia, across the Suisun Marsh to Suisun City, putting the region directly on the overland route from San Francisco to Ogden and beyond.

In 1888, a fire destroyed much of downtown Suisun, including many city landmarks, such as the Robert Hotel, Crowley's saloon, the Union Hotel, and the Orkel grain warehouses. Citizens considered abandoning the city after the devastation, but instead decided to rebuild and raise money to construct a waterworks system that would allow them to fight future fires more effectively.

In the 1960s and 1970s, Suisun City experienced rapid growth as the San Francisco Bay Area's suburban ring expanded to the formerly rural Solano County. Also in the 1960s, Interstate 80 was constructed two miles (3.2 km) outside the city, effectively moving commercial traffic away from railways and water conveyance.

In January 2025, the city of Suisun City announced that it was investigating expanding to lands to the east, effectively annexing much of California Forever.

== Geography ==
Suisun City is located at 38°14′42″N 122°1′1″W (38.244863, -122.017048).

According to the United States Census Bureau, the city has a total area of 4.1 square miles (11 km^{2}), of which 4.0 square miles (10 km^{2}) is land and 0.06 square miles (0.16 km^{2}) (1.48%) is water.

The city is adjacent to Suisun Marsh, at 84,000 acres (34,000 ha) the largest contiguous estuarine marsh remaining on the west coast of North America.

=== Climate ===
According to the Köppen Climate Classification system, Suisun City has a warm-summer Mediterranean climate, abbreviated "Csb" on climate maps.

== Demographics ==
Historical population
Census	Pop.	Note	%±
1870	462		—
1880	554		19.9%
1890	499		−9.9%
1900	625		25.3%
1910	641		2.6%
1920	769		20.0%
1930	905		17.7%
1940	706		−22.0%
1950	946		34.0%
1960	2,470		161.1%
1970	2,917		18.1%
1980	11,087		280.1%
1990	22,686		104.6%
2000	26,118		15.1%
2010	28,111		7.6%
2020	29,518		5.0%
U.S. Decennial Census

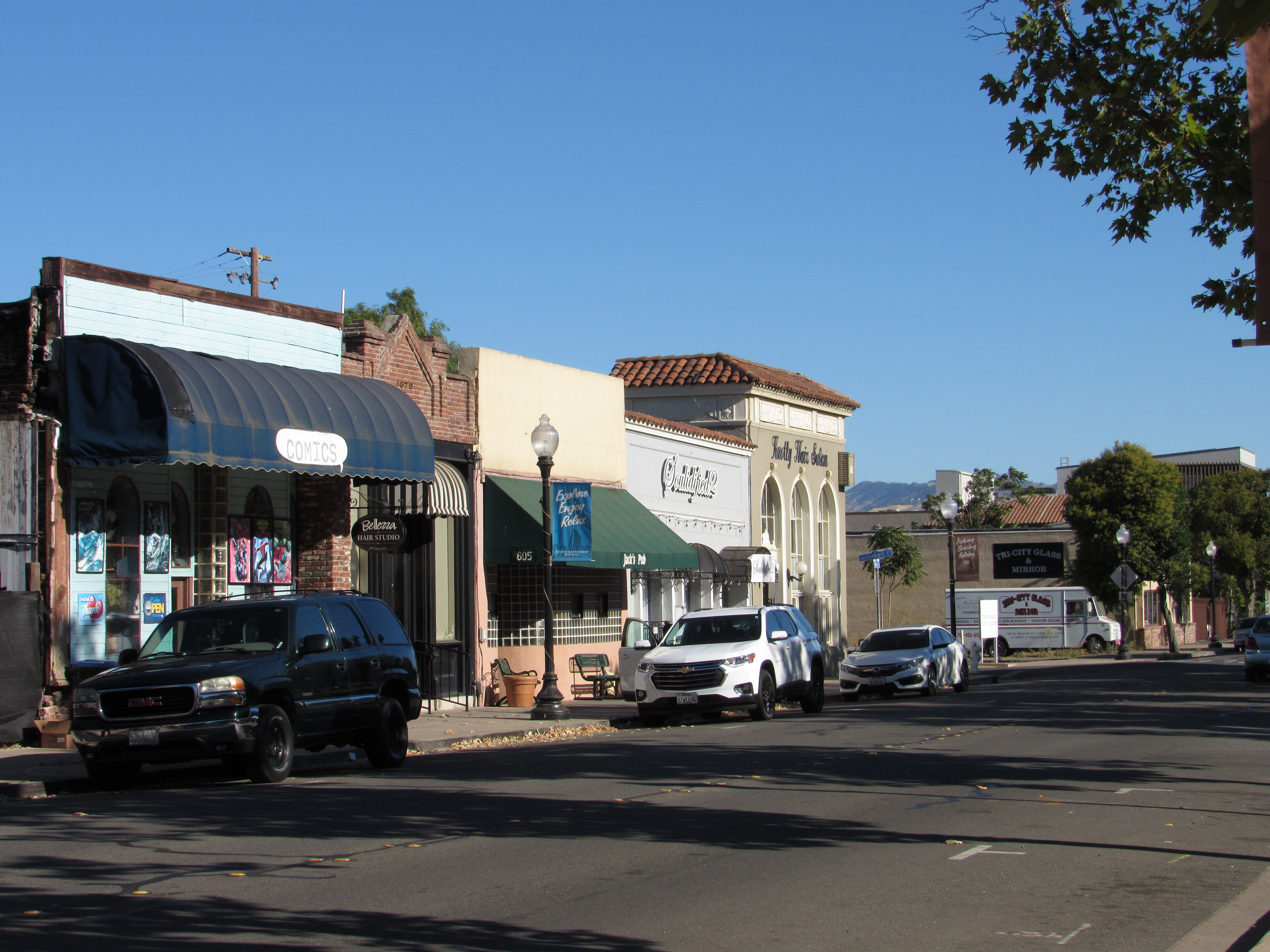
Looking down Main Street in Suisun City

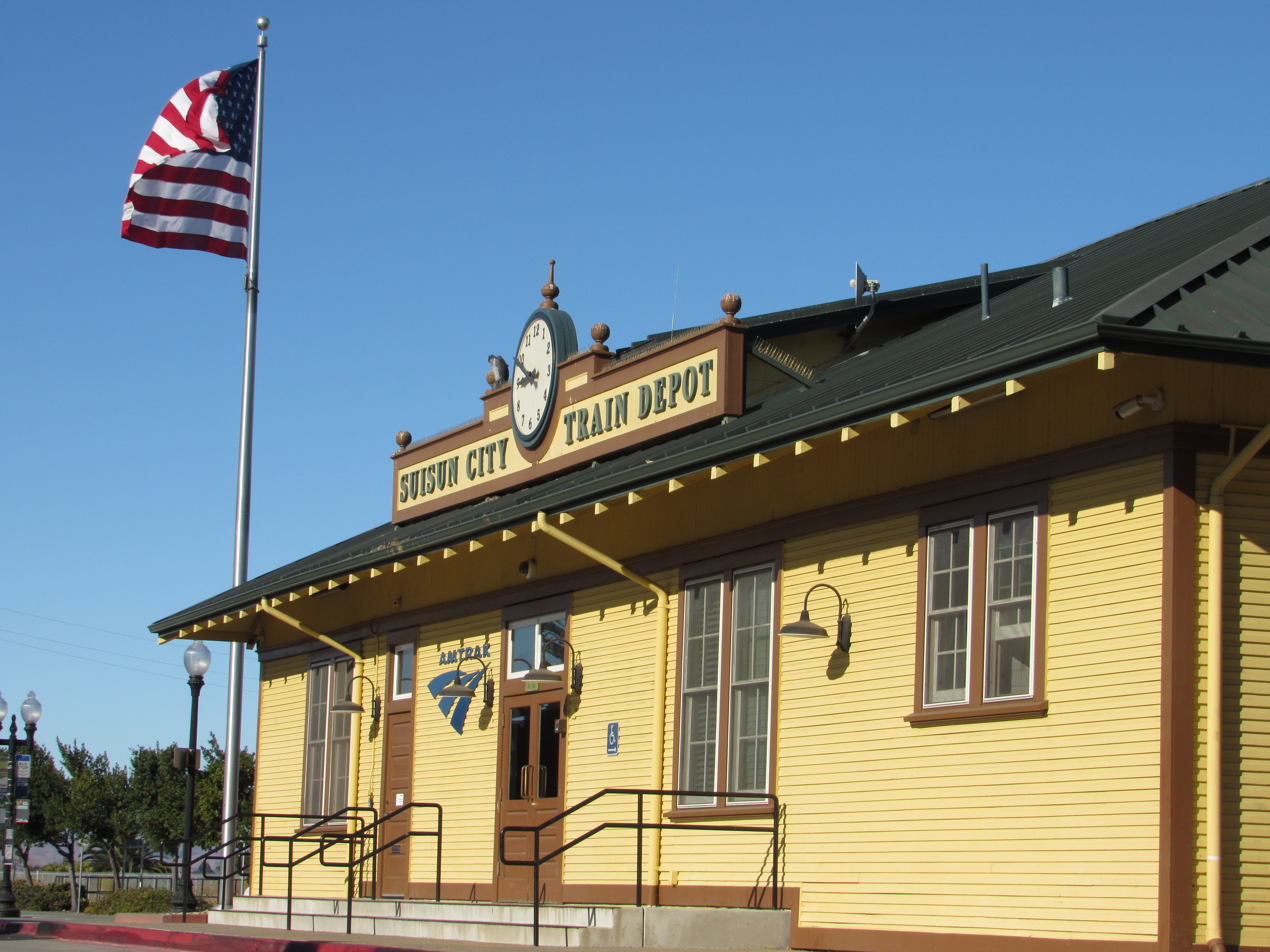
American flag flies in front of Suisun City Train Depot

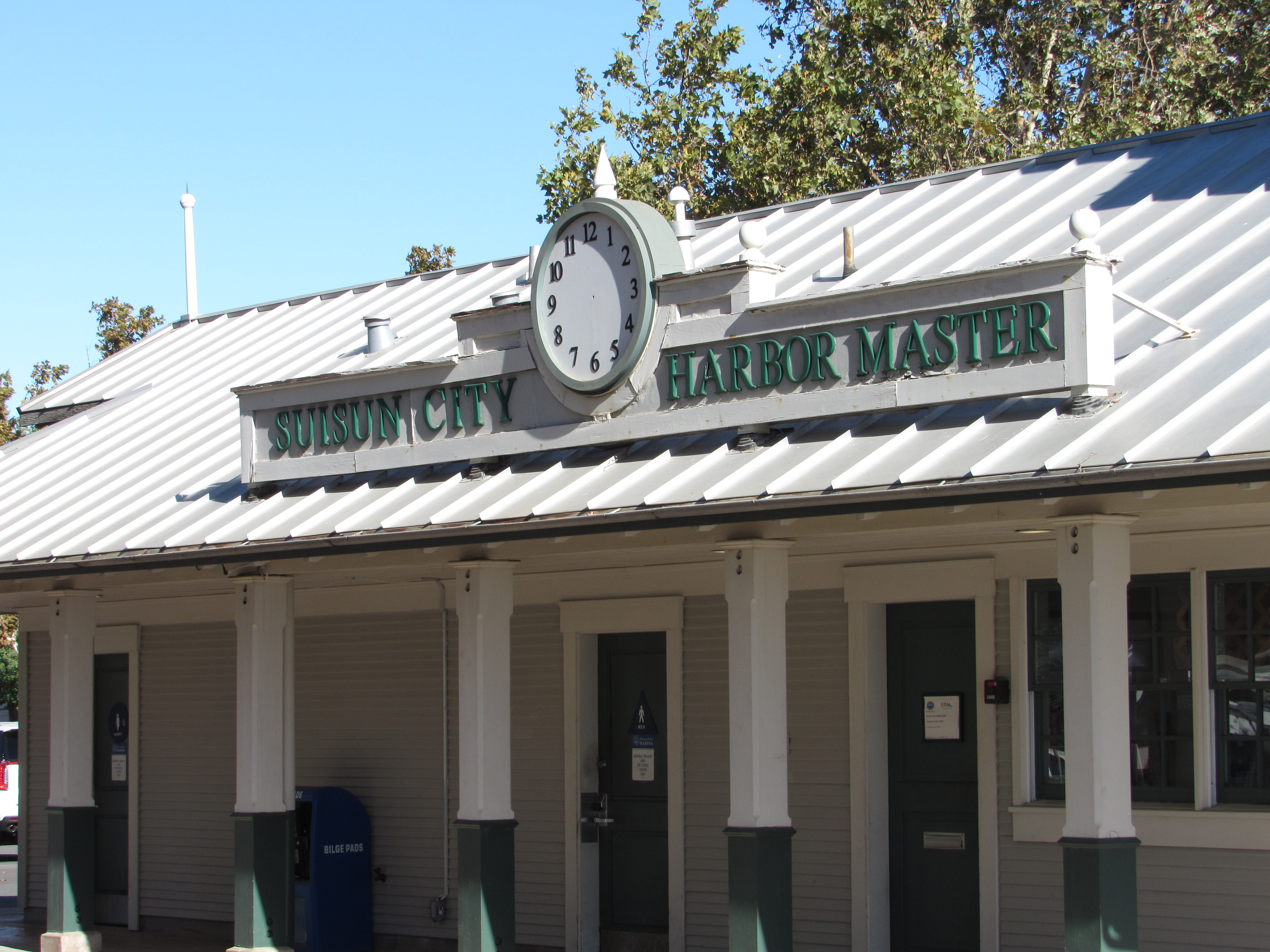
Suisun City Harbor Master building

=== 2020 census ===
As of the 2020 census, Suisun City had a population of 29,518. The population density was 7,370.3 inhabitants per square mile (2,845.7/km^{2}). The median age was 36.7 years. The age distribution was 23.3% under the age of 18, 9.2% aged 18 to 24, 28.7% aged 25 to 44, 25.2% aged 45 to 64, and 13.6% who were 65 years of age or older. For every 100 females, there were 94.8 males, and for every 100 females age 18 and over there were 92.2 males.

The census reported that 99.8% of the population lived in households, 0.2% lived in non-institutionalized group quarters, and 0.1% were institutionalized. 100.0% of residents lived in urban areas, while 0.0% lived in rural areas.

There were 9,316 households, of which 39.6% had children under the age of 18 living in them. Of all households, 51.9% were married-couple households, 7.2% were cohabiting couple households, 15.0% were households with a male householder and no spouse or partner present, and 25.9% were households with a female householder and no spouse or partner present. About 15.9% of all households were made up of individuals and 6.4% had someone living alone who was 65 years of age or older. The average household size was 3.16. There were 7,283 families (78.2% of all households).

There were 9,522 housing units, of which 9,316 (97.8%) were occupied and 2.2% were vacant. Of occupied units, 67.5% were owner-occupied and 32.5% were occupied by renters. The homeowner vacancy rate was 0.7% and the rental vacancy rate was 2.4%.

Racial composition as of the 2020 census
Race	Number	Percent
White	8,410	28.5%
Black or African American	5,604	19.0%
American Indian and Alaska Native	501	1.7%
Asian	5,837	19.8%
Native Hawaiian and Other Pacific Islander	379	1.3%
Some other race	3,954	13.4%
Two or more races	4,833	16.4%
Hispanic or Latino (of any race)	8,585	29.1%

=== 2023 estimate ===
In 2023, the US Census Bureau estimated that the median household income was $97,083, and the per capita income was $37,217. About 6.4% of families and 8.7% of the population were below the poverty line.

=== 2010 census ===
The 2010 United States census reported that Suisun City had a population of 28,111. The population density was 6,752.3 inhabitants per square mile (2,607.1/km^{2}). The racial makeup of Suisun City was 10,805 (38.4%) White, 5,713 (20.3%) African American, 196 (0.7%) Native American, 5,348 (19.0%) Asian, 340 (1.2%) Pacific Islander, 2,898 (10.3%) from other races, and 2,811 (10.0%) from two or more races. Hispanic or Latino of any race were 6,753 persons (24.0%).

The Census reported that 28,067 people (99.8% of the population) lived in households, 27 (0.1%) lived in non-institutionalized group quarters, and 17 (0.1%) were institutionalized.

There were 8,918 households, of which 4,013 (45.0%) had children under the age of 18 living in them, 4,856 (54.5%) were opposite-sex married couples living together, 1,482 (16.6%) had a female householder with no husband present, 624 (7.0%) had a male householder with no wife present. There were 596 (6.7%) unmarried opposite-sex partnerships, and 66 (0.7%) same-sex married couples or partnerships. 1,443 households (16.2%) were made up of individuals, and 350 (3.9%) had someone living alone who was 65 years of age or older. The average household size was 3.15. There were 6,962 families (78.1% of all households); the average family size was 3.52.

7,737 people (27.5%) were under the age of 18, 2,950 people (10.5%) aged 18 to 24, 7,850 people (27.9%) aged 25 to 44, 7,418 people (26.4%) aged 45 to 64, and 2,156 people (7.7%) who were 65 years of age or older. The median age was 33.0 years. For every 100 females, there were 96.9 males. For every 100 females age 18 and over, there were 92.9 males.

There were 9,454 housing units at an average density of 2,270.9 units per square mile (876.8 units/km^{2}), of which 6,184 (69.3%) were owner-occupied, and 2,734 (30.7%) were occupied by renters. The homeowner vacancy rate was 3.0%; the rental vacancy rate was 5.9%. 19,372 people (68.9% of the population) lived in owner-occupied housing units and 8,695 people (30.9%) lived in rental housing units.

== Education ==
Schools in Fairfield and Suisun are operated by the Fairfield-Suisun Unified School District.

== Schools ==
- Suisun Elementary School
- Crescent Elementary School
- Crystal Middle School
- Dan O Root II Elementary School

=== High schools ===
- Armijo High School
- Fairfield High School
- Rodriguez High School

== Transportation ==
- Fairfield and Suisun Transit
- Suisun/Fairfield Amtrak station

== Gallery ==
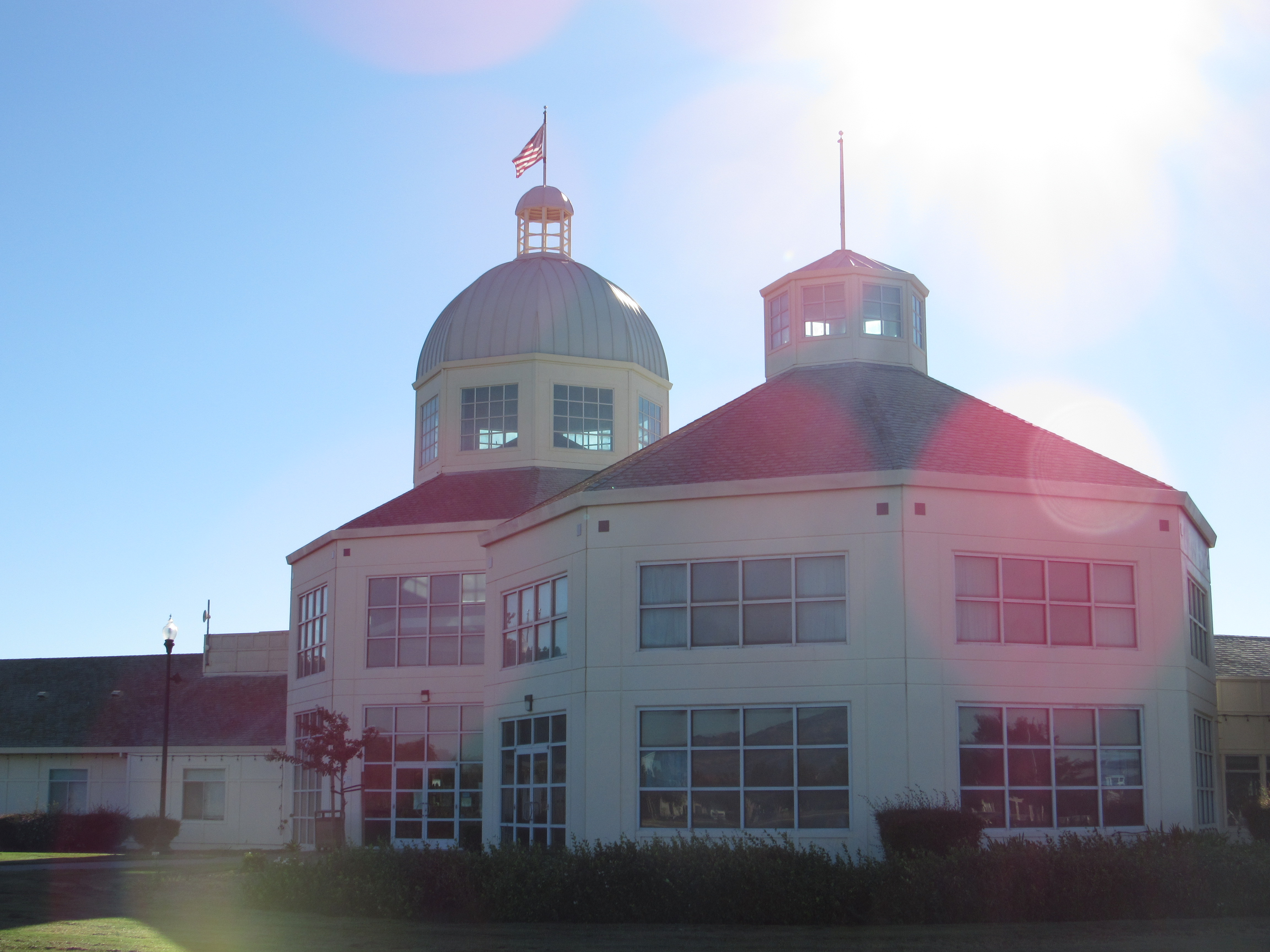
Suisun City Hall

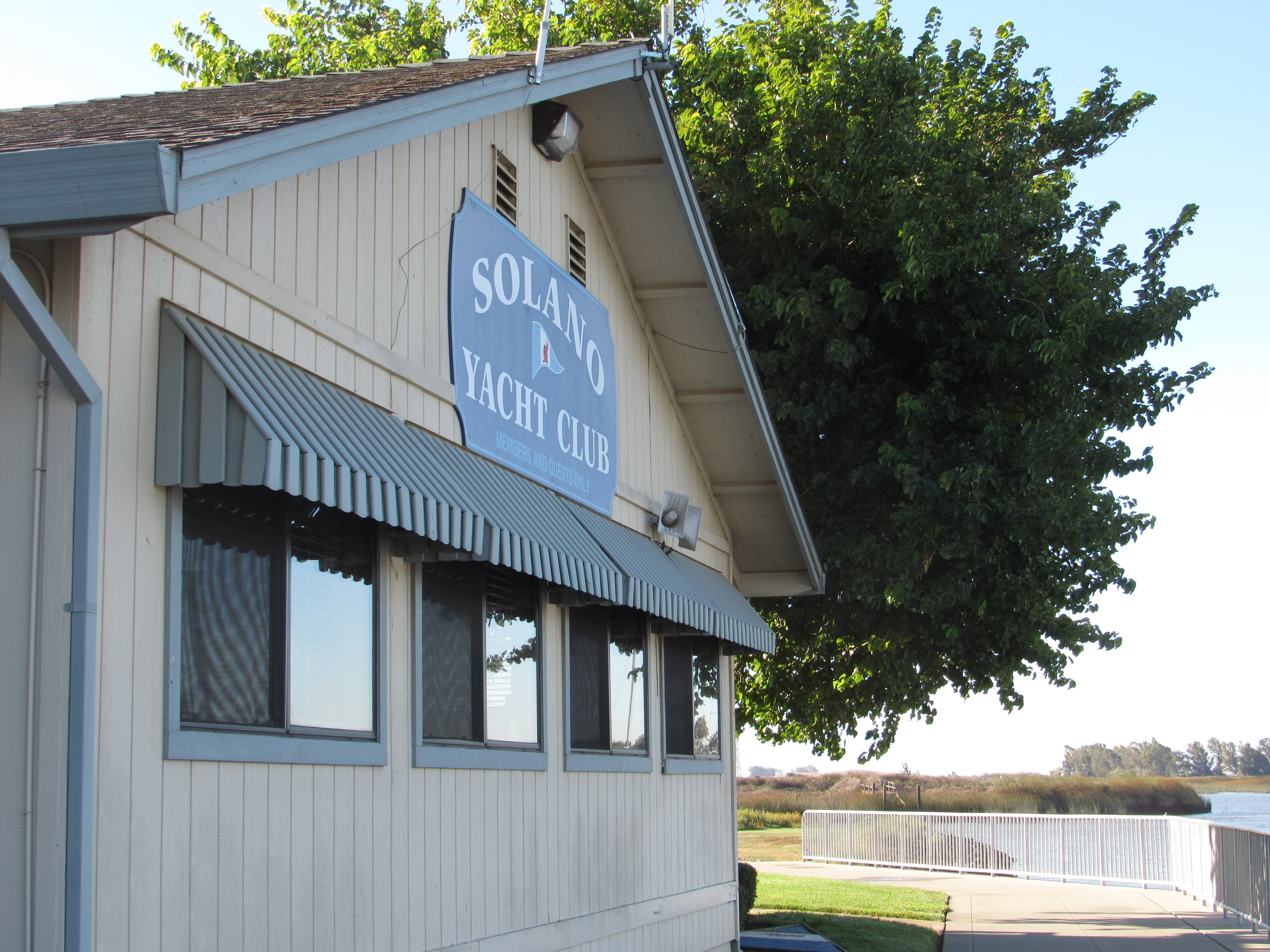
Solano Yacht Club in Suisun City

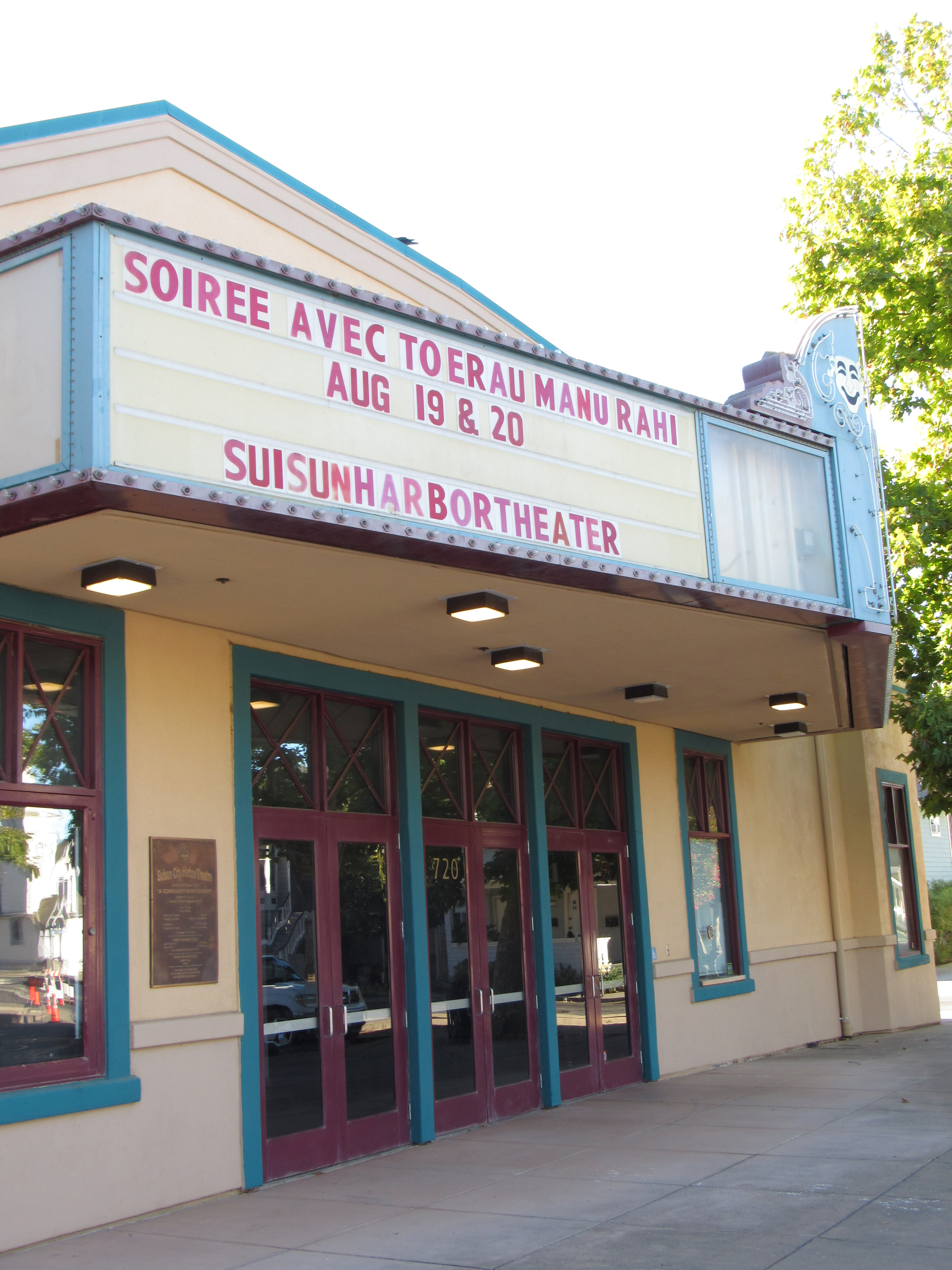
Suisun Harbor Theatre

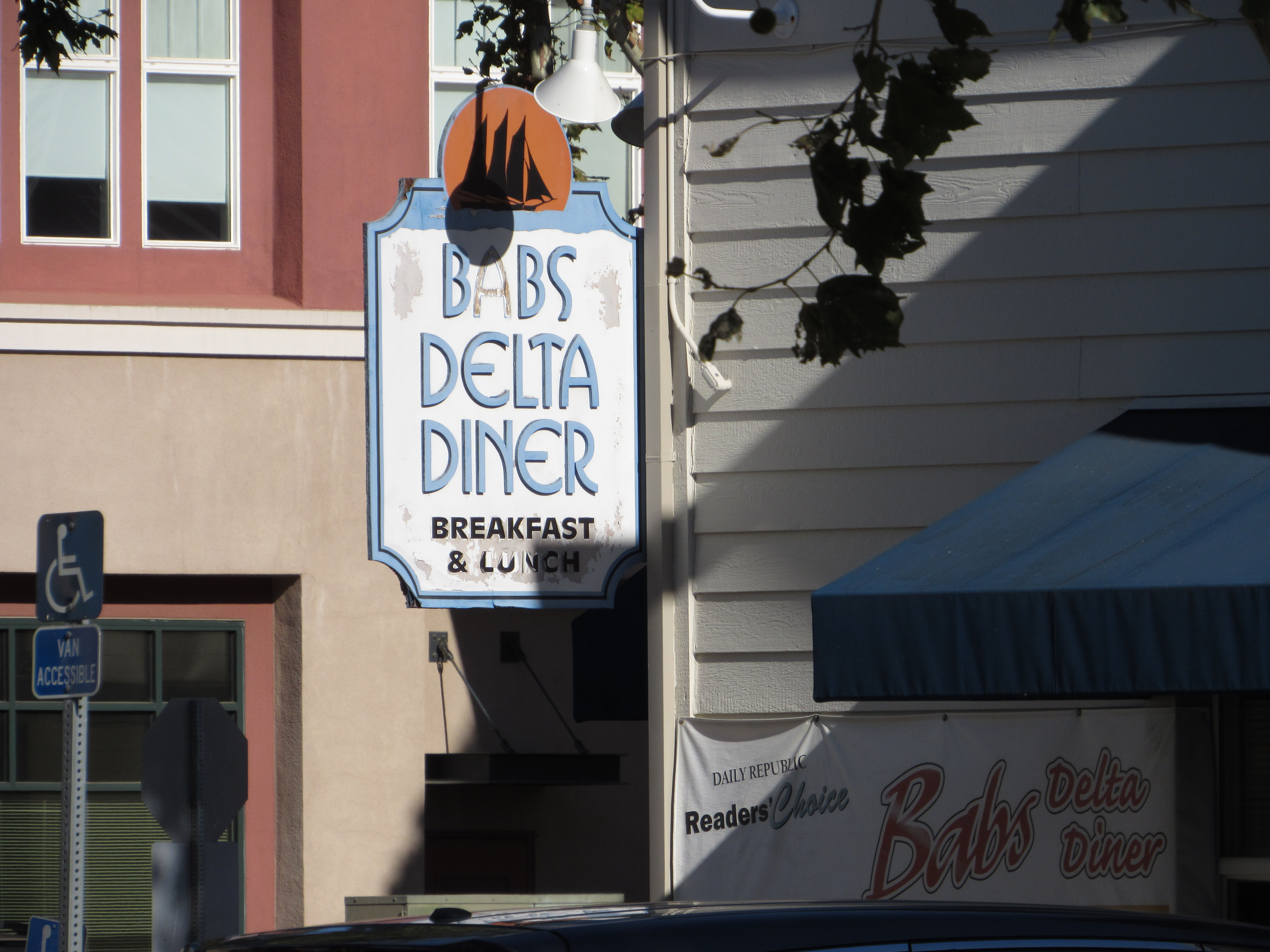
Bab's Delta Diner in Suisun City

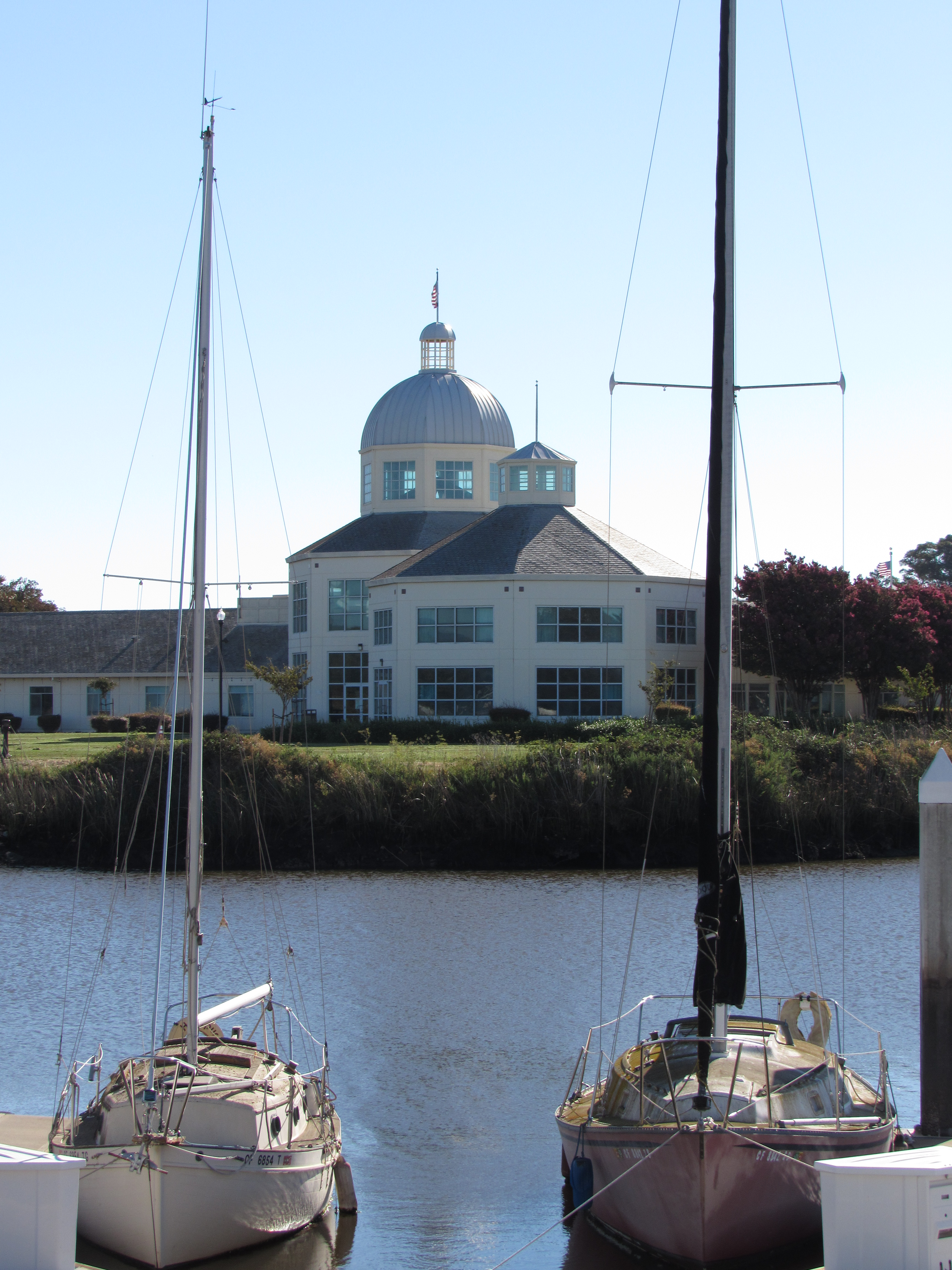
Suisun City Hall as seen across Suisun Slough between two boats in the harbor

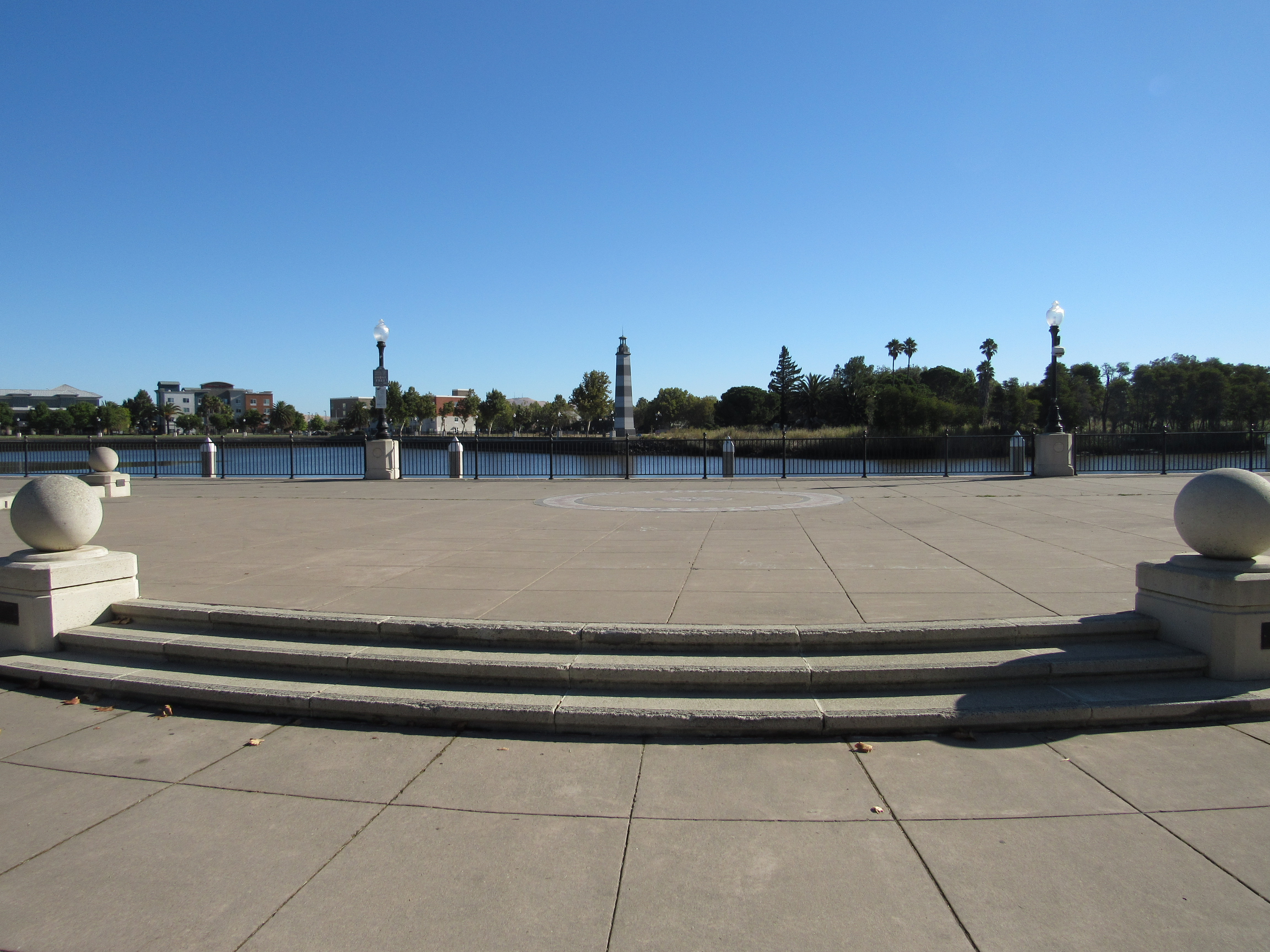
Harbor Plaza in Suisun City

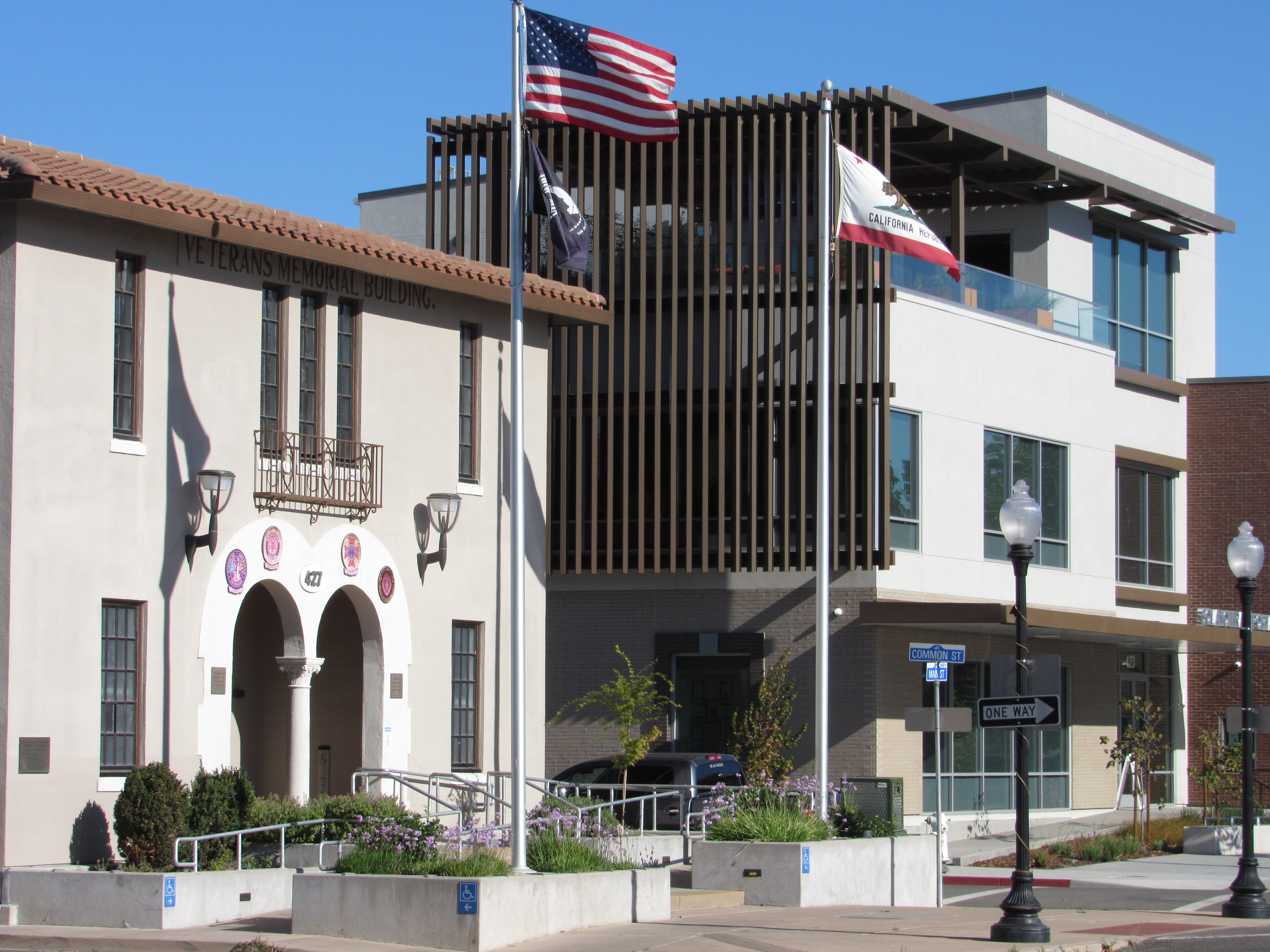
Veterans Hall and Solano Transportation Authority in Suisun City

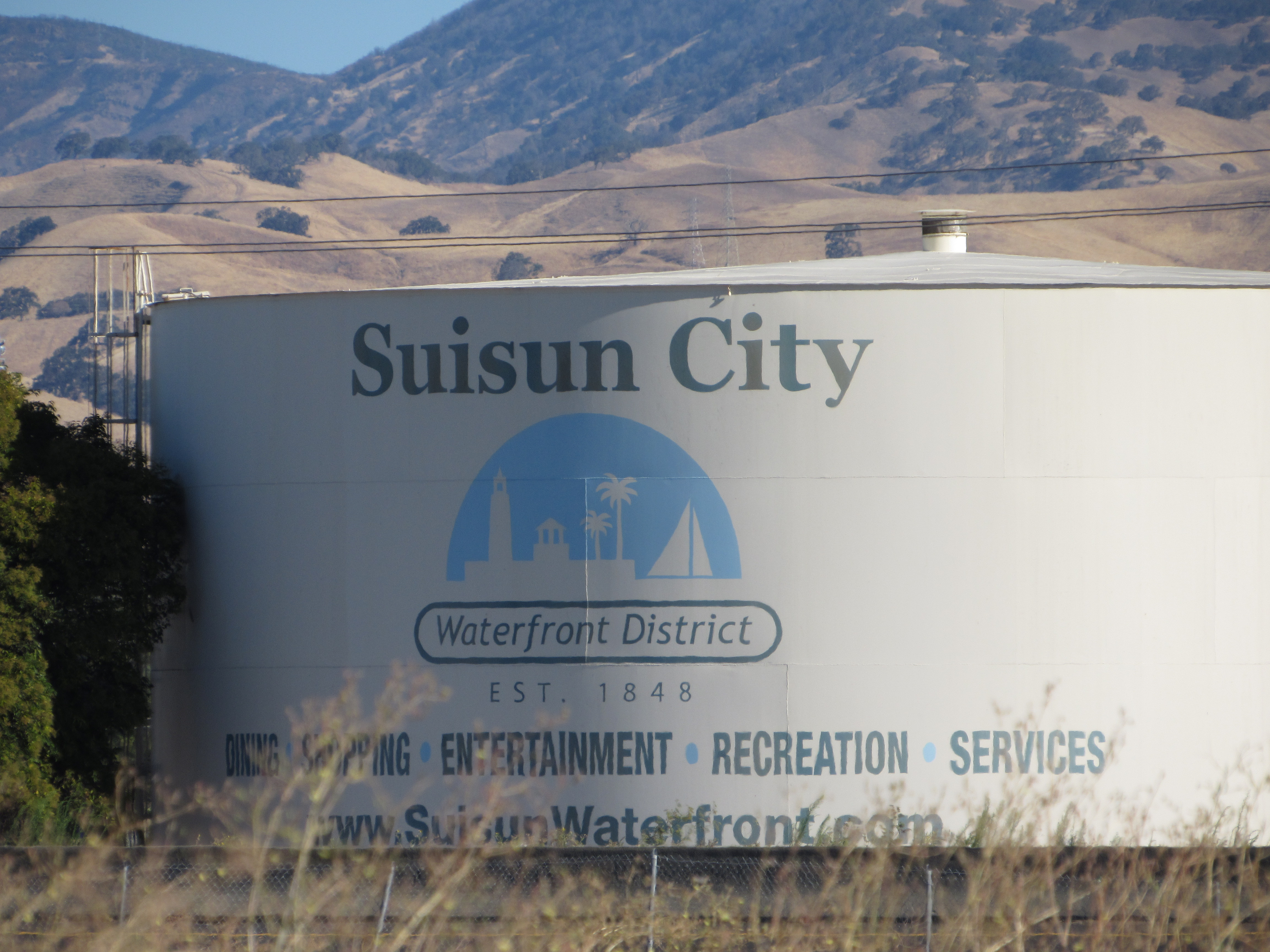
Suisun City water tower

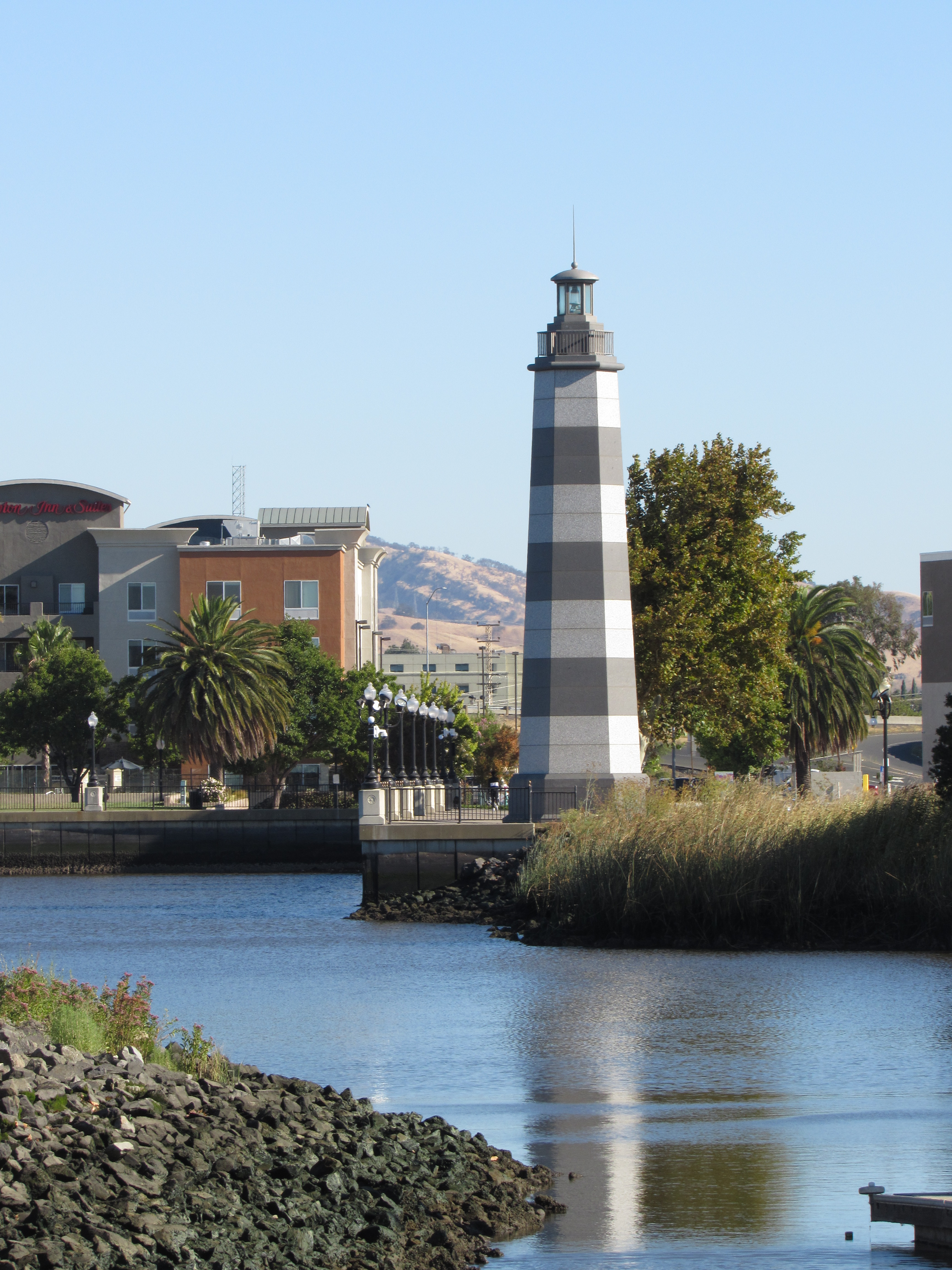
Harbor Lighthouse in Suisun City from across Suisun Slough

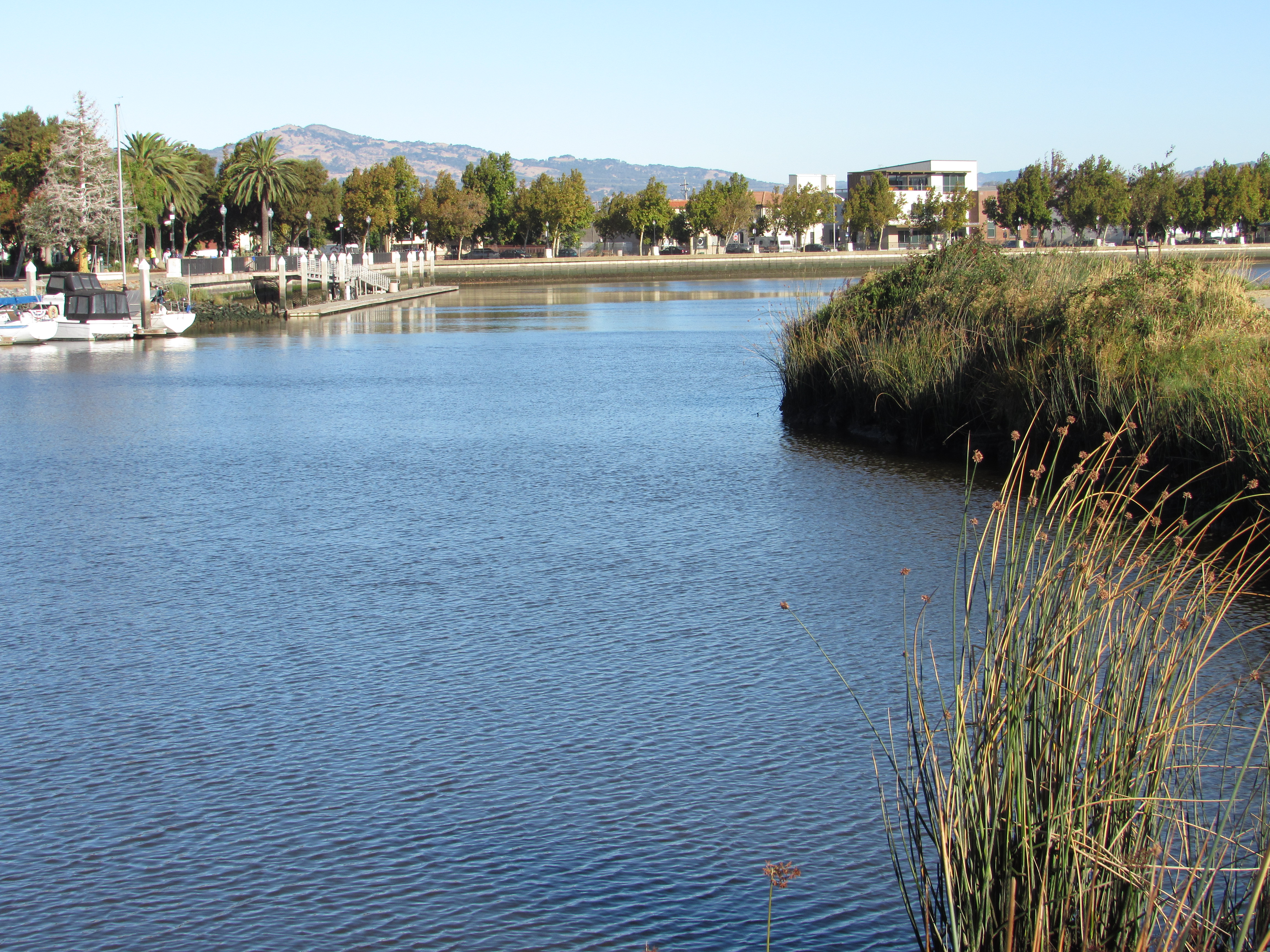
Suisun Slough as seen from Solano Yacht Club

== Sister cities ==
- Naguilian, La Union, Philippines
