= Suisun Marsh =

Largest brackish water marsh on west coast of US

Coordinates: 38.18774°N 122.06463°W

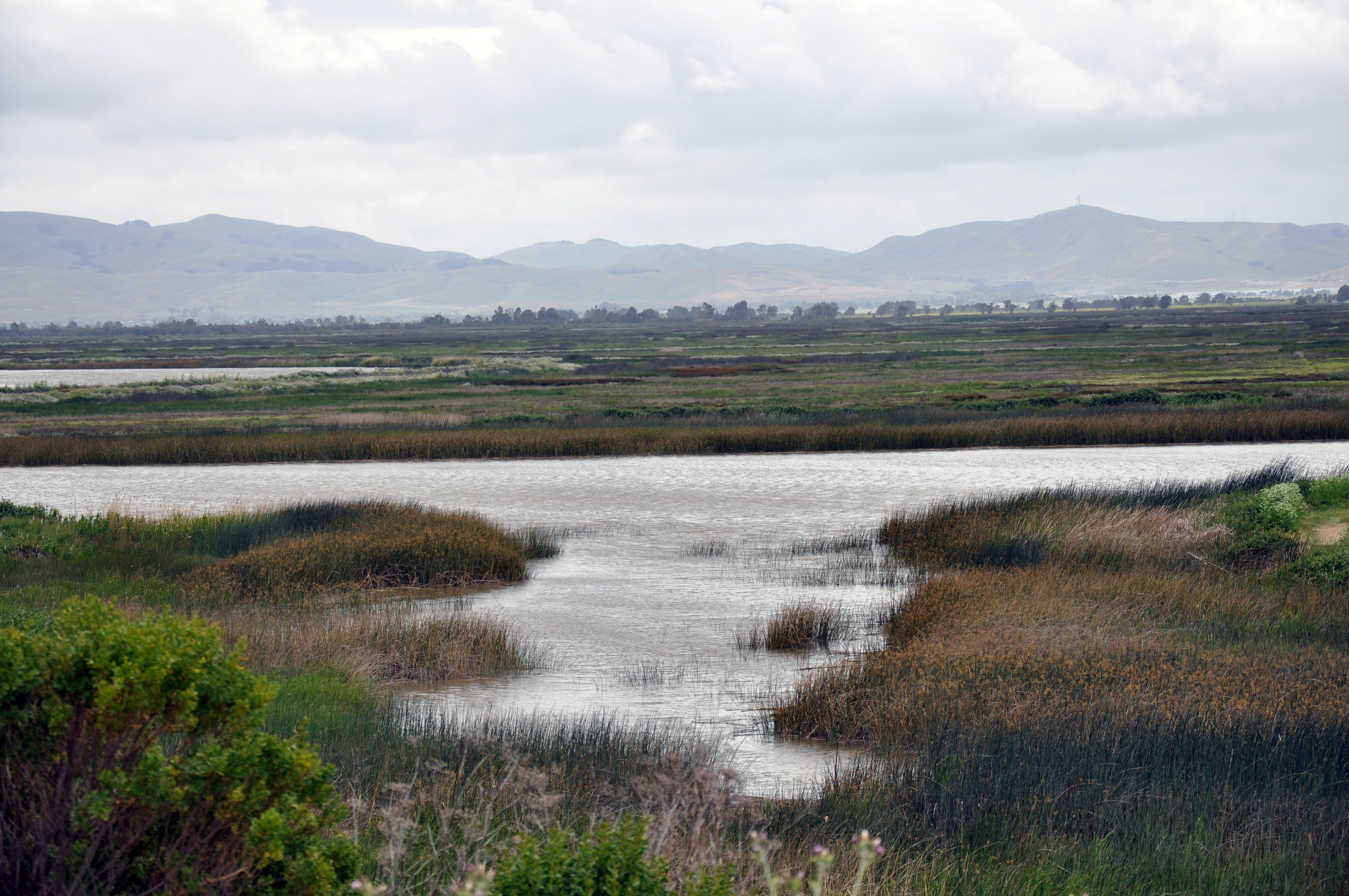
Suisun Marsh

Mount Diablo as seen from the Suisun Marsh:

Located in northern California, the Suisun Marsh (/səˈsuːn/ soo-SOON) has been referred to as the largest brackish water marsh on west coast of the United States of America. (Note: "At about 470 km², the marsh is often referred to as the largest brackish water marsh on the western coast of North America. While this claim is debatable, Suisun Marsh is certainly the largest such marsh in California.") The marsh land is part of a tidal estuary, and subject to tidal ebb and flood. The marsh is home to many species of birds and other wildlife, and is formed by the confluence of the Sacramento and San Joaquin rivers between Martinez and Suisun City, California and several other smaller, local watersheds. Adjacent to Suisun Bay, the marsh is immediately west of the legally defined Sacramento-San Joaquin Delta as well as part of the San Francisco Bay estuary.

The Suisun Marsh is named for the Suisunes, a Patwin/Wintun sub-tribe, who inhabited the area around 200 years ago.

== Overview ==
Suisun Marsh, 116,000 acres (470 km^{2}) of land, bays, and sloughs, is one of the largest estuarine marshes in the western United States. Geologically, the Suisun Marsh is the product of water-borne sediment deposition, carried from the Sacramento and San Joaquin Rivers into the San Francisco Bay. This process—the weathering of the parent rock of the Sierra Nevada and Vaca Mountains, transport of the weathered material via rivers and creeks, and ultimate deposition into San Francisco Bay—has taken place over thousands of years and has resulted in the patchwork nature of the marsh. The marsh areas consist of peat soils formed by the decay of emergent plants over time.

Originally, Suisun Marsh was a vast stretch of tidal wetlands broken by branching tidal channels and ponds. The area alternately flooded and drained with the rise and fall of the tides. In winter, the ponds supported high numbers of migratory waterfowl. From the years of the Gold Rush to about 1880, the marsh was extensively used by market hunters to provide fresh waterfowl and feathers to San Francisco markets. From the 1880s until the 1930s, however, this area was gradually converted to agriculture, made possible by the construction of levees to hold back the water. Eventually, increasing soil salinity made cultivation and even cattle grazing unprofitable and cultivation ceased on all wetland areas. Most of the marsh was then purchased by public and private interests as habitat for waterfowl, mainly to support hunting. Later, the construction of water development projects (specifically, the federal Central Valley Project and the California State Water Project) in the Sacramento-San Joaquin watersheds altered the natural salinity regime of the marsh, making it more saline. In an effort to maintain the wetlands, the marsh landowners sought legislation to preserve the area from residential or commercial development. In addition, they pursued relief from the impacts of the water projects on the salinity regime of the marsh. As a result, the parties entered into agreements to offset the impacts of the water projects on the managed wetlands. Suisun Marsh supports a diversity of fish, wildlife and plants, including a large population of river otters, a number of native fish species, and birds ranging from marsh wrens to American white pelicans.

Rush Ranch is a 2070-acre (8.4 km^{2}) remnant tidal marsh preserve within Suisun Marsh that was acquired for wildlife habitat and public access to the marsh by the Solano County Farmlands and Open Space Foundation in 1988. The non-profit organization, dedicated to protect and preserve farmland, ranchland and open space in Solano County, has been renamed Solano Land Trust.

A component of the Solano Land Trust located at Rush Ranch is the Rush Ranch Educational Council, more commonly known as RREC. RREC is an all volunteer, non-profit organization that offers an educational program to 3rd and 4th grade students who visit the ranch on field trips. The program is offered at no charge, made possible by a grant from the Nature Conservancy in partnership with the Solano Land Trust. The program—designed to meet California K-12 education standards for history-social studies—teaches children about the original inhabitants of the ranch, the Patwin Indians, on a recreated Patwin village located on the ranch. The interactive program is divided into six stations, each focused on a facet of Patwin culture and daily life. At these stations, RREC docents use replicated tools and materials to demonstrate the ways in which the Patwins were able to thrive and ensure generational survival using seasonally available resources and by employing sustainable harvesting and natural resource conservation.

Another public part of the marsh is Grizzly Island Wildlife Area which is managed primarily for waterfowl, although over 230 species of birds have been seen here as well as many mammals, amphibians, reptiles, and fish. Grizzly Island has an unusually dense population of river otters, which can be seen swimming in its numerous sloughs, ponds, and roadside ditches. In the fall, the Grizzly Island Wildlife Area herd of tule elk breeds. The bugling of bull elk can be heard especially in the early morning and evening. Access to certain areas of the Wildlife Area is limited during the first nine days of pheasant hunting season around November, and on Wednesdays and Saturdays during the waterfowl hunting season from October through January.

Studies by the CALFED Suisun Marsh Levee Investigation demonstrate that the current configuration of the 230 miles (370 km) of levees in the Marsh prevent salinity intrusion into the freshwater of the Delta used by 22 million people for drinking water.

== Flooded ponds ==
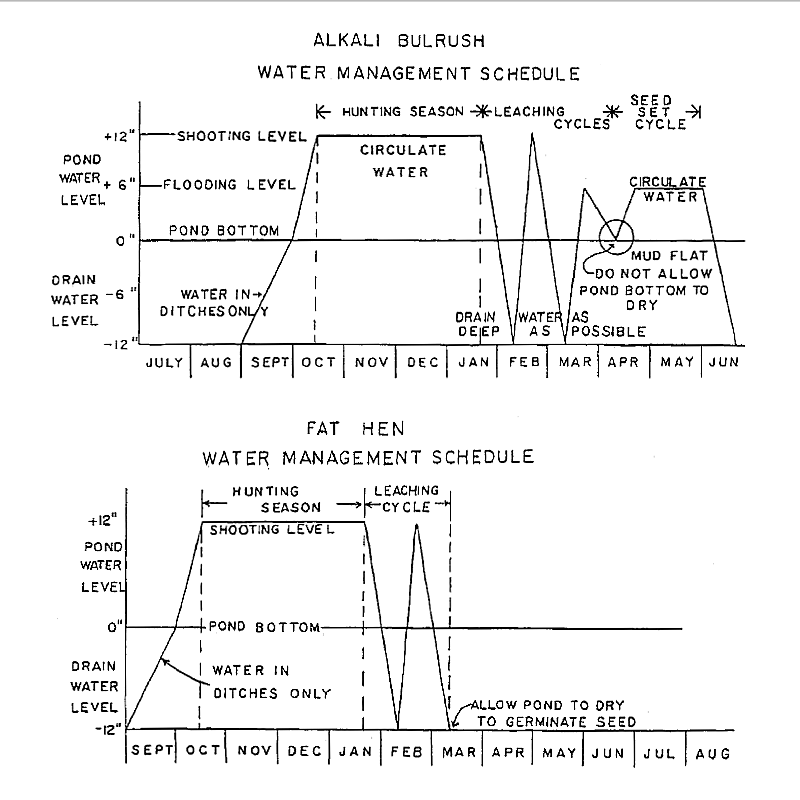
Schedule for flooding ponds during the fall hunting season, then leaching, and finally drying them during the summer.

As noted above, the dikes, or levees, of Suisun Marsh were originally built by nineteenth century farmers seeking to create farmland from tidal marsh. While this system is still in use on the Sacramento-San Joaquin Delta islands to the east, it failed in the Suisun Marsh due to unacceptably high soil salinities. Portions of the marsh were subsequently converted from farming to permanently and seasonally flooded wetlands in the twentieth century. Approximately 230 miles of levees maintain seasonally and permanently flooded wetlands. Between approximately mid-October and mid-January, managed seasonal wetlands are flooded to a depth of 8 to 12 inches to attract waterfowl.

The rest of the year, the ponds are flooded and drained on a schedule designed to optimize conditions for plants which provide seeds preferred by waterfowl, namely alkali bulrush, fat hen, and brass buttons. Ponds left flooded through at least the spring provide brood rearing habitat. The flood-and-drain cycle is also designed to minimize soil salinity by leaching and flushing salts. This flood management program also supports plants such as tules, cattails, saltgrass, and pickleweed, which may not yield preferred waterfowl food seeds, but do provide habitat for invertebrates important to pre-breeding waterfowl and other wildlife.

When Suisun agricultural lands reverted to wetlands, they provided habitat for waterfowl displaced decades earlier by reclamation. In addition, the presence of these new wetlands eased waterfowl crop depredation in the Central Valley. It also provided habitat no longer available in the Central Valley due to extensive reclamation for agriculture and urbanization. By about 1930, waterfowl hunting had become the primary use of the Suisun Marsh. It is the dominant use today, with 158 private duck clubs and large public hunting areas.

== Water management ==
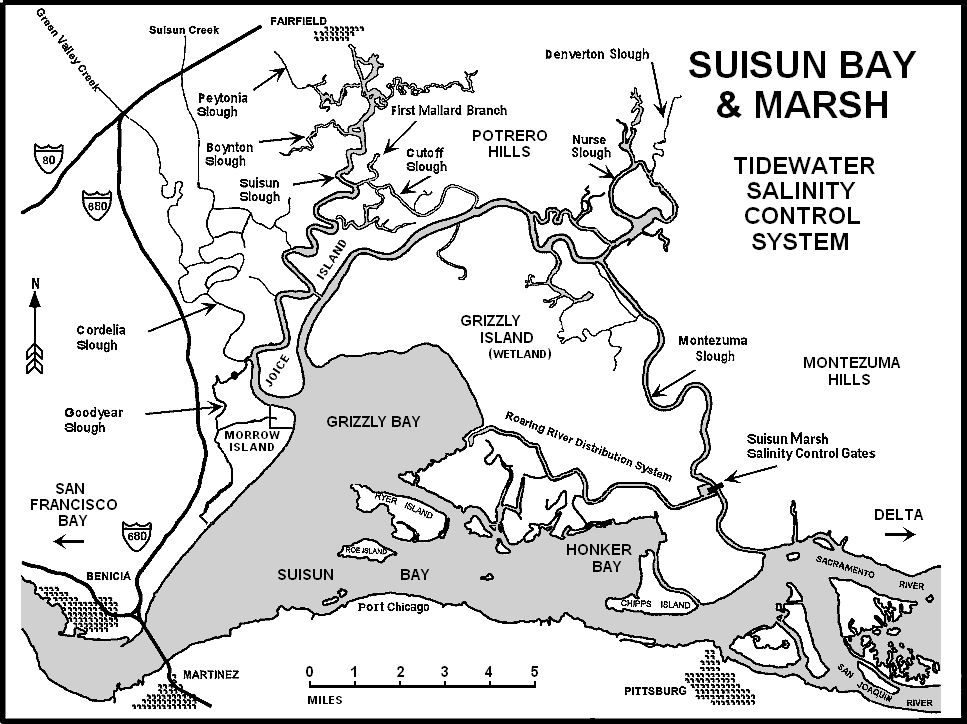
Montezuma Slough, to the north and east of Grizzly Island, is the key to wetland management.

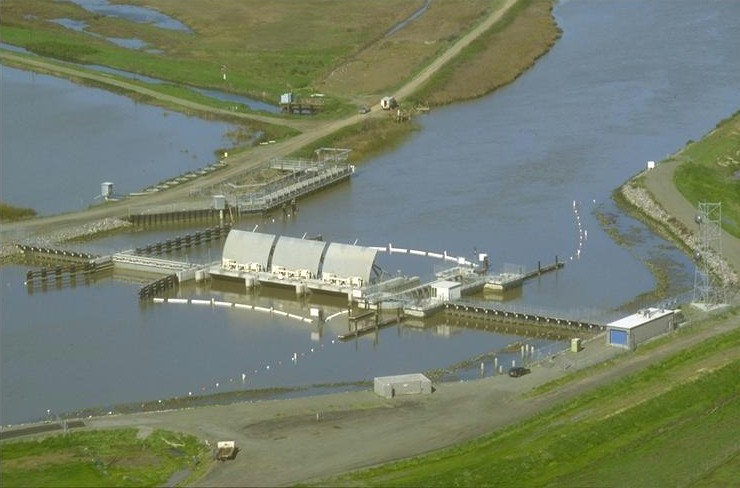
Suisun Marsh Salinity Control Gates, open to allow freshwater into the Montezuma Slough.

The wetland managers for both the private hunting clubs and the state's public land take water from major and minor sloughs throughout the marsh. Montezuma Slough, one of the largest, is open at both ends, and its flood tide current is longer and stronger than its ebb tide current, causing a net west-to-east flow which draws higher saline water eastward from Grizzly Bay.

The flood tide pushing through the slough takes half an hour longer to traverse the marsh than does the matching flood tide following the more direct route in the main Suisin Bay channel. Thus, high tide at the east end of the slough arrives out of phase with high tide in the main channel, and rather than being pushed back, as it would be in the main channel or in a dead-end slough, the slough water keeps flowing eastward, drawing more saline water with it.

To meet the salinity requirements stipulated by the California Water Resources Control Board to support "beneficial uses" in Decision-1485, the California State Water Project and the federal Central Valley Project built the Montezuma Slough Salinity Control Gates. They began operation in 1989. The gates span Montezuma Slough near the Roaring River intake and are periodically operated from October to May to meet the more recently established salinity standards set by Decision-1641, to block the salty flood tide from Grizzly Bay but allow passage of the freshwater ebb tide from the mouth of the Sacramento-San Joaquin Delta.

Because the Salinity Control Gates are more effective than anticipated other proposed salinity control measures were abandoned. The gates operate as needed from October through May.

== Fish ==
Although the Suisun Marsh is managed for waterfowl, it is also an important fish habitat, especially for wild salmon. Monitoring stations throughout the marsh measure the impact of water management activities on fish populations, and fish screens prevent the diversion and entrapment of fish in the waterfowl ponds.

The Marsh supports 80% of the state's commercial salmon fishery by providing important tidal rearing areas for juvenile fish allowing them to grow twice as fast as those reared in the upper watershed, thus, greatly enhancing their survival. And is an important area for native fishes including the delta smelt which is protected by the federal Endangered Species Act.

== Flora ==
Suisun Marsh is home to the only two known occurrences of the Suisun thistle, Cirsium hydrophilum var. hydrophilum, a variety of thistle which is a federally listed endangered species. The Suisun thistle is perennial and stays in its juvenile stages of life until it is ready to flower and once the rosette reaches its mature phase it can take up to a year or more to develop the leafy stem.
