= Francisco Solano (Spanish writer) =

Francisco Solano is a Spanish writer and literary critic. He was born in Burgos in 1952. He published his debut novel La noche mineral in 1995, to critical acclaim. His next novel, Una cabeza de rape, won the Premio de Novela Jaén in 1997. He has also published a travel book on Mexico and a biography of the model and activist Cora Van Millingen.

As a critic, he is best known for his contributions to the Babelia book supplement in the El País newspaper. In addition, he writes on literature for several other magazines and journals.
