= Rockville Hills Regional Park =

Park in California, United States

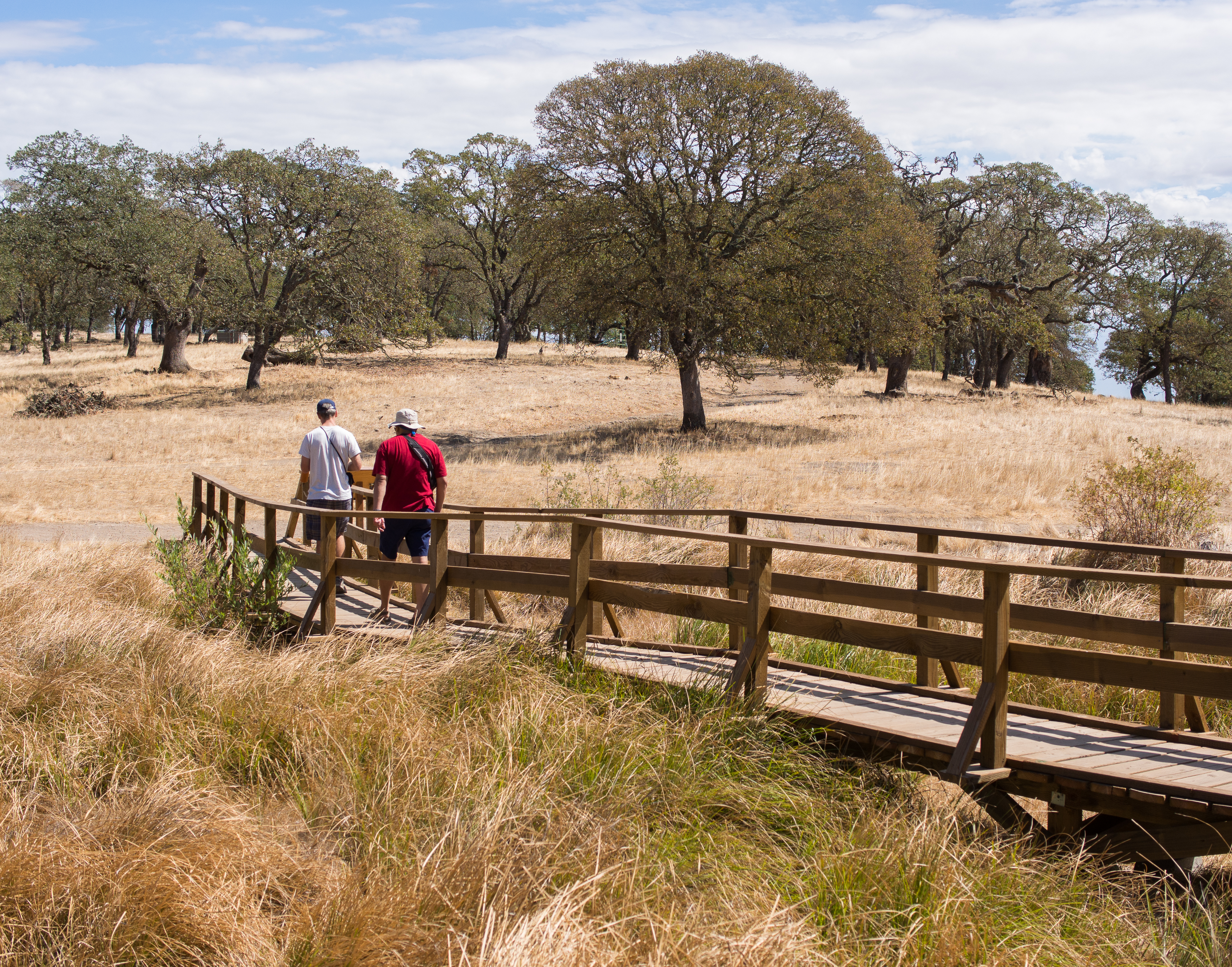

- Location within California Location within the United States
- Location: Solano County, California
- Nearest city: Fairfield
- Coordinates: 38.245°N 122.140°W
- Area: 633-acre (2.56 km^{2})

Rockville Hills Regional Park is a 633-acre (~256 hectare, 2.56 square kilometer) regional park in the city of Fairfield, Solano County, California, United States. The park is known for its volcanic rocks, thin topsoil, grasses, and blue oak trees. There are also oak woodlands, grassland savannas, chaparral and some aquatic habitats.

== History ==
During the 1960s, the city of Fairfield was going to build a golf course on the land. However, they decided to transform the area into a trailed park instead. In 2012, nearly 200 oak and manzanita trees were removed from the park at the behest of PG&E, the major California power company, to avoid sparking fires.

In 2015, it was reported to be one of the best mountain biking spots in the San Francisco Bay Area by the Sacramento Bee.

In 2018, the park was closed due to a red flag warning, a wildfire probability warning. This is despite the fact the park has never suffered from a conflagration. Also, in 2018, the local 4-H club cleaned garbage, planted endemic trees, and planted moss spores over graffiti covered stones.

== Wildlife ==
The park is home to cows and birds in addition to deer, fox, waterfowl, hawks and bobcats.
