= Chief Solano =

Native American chief

- Sem-Yeto

Suisun leader

Personal details
- Born: about 1798 Suisun Bay Area, California, USA
- Died: about 1851 Yulyul village (near present-day Rockville), California, USA
- Parent: Sulapy (father)

Sem-Yeto (c. 1798 – c. 1851) was a leader of the Suisunes, a Patwin people of the Suisun Bay region of northern California. Baptized as Francisco Solano and also known as Chief Solano, he was a notable Native American leader in Alta California because of his alliance, friendship, and eventually the support of his entire tribe to General Mariano Guadalupe Vallejo of Sonoma, in military and political excursions around Sonoma County and the San Francisco Bay Area. By allying with Vallejo and assisting him in quelling Native American uprisings north and west of Sonoma between 1836 and 1843, Sem-Yeto is regarded as a controversial historical figure. The California county of Solano is named for him.

== Childhood ==
Sem-Yeto, an epithet meaning "brave or fierce hand," was born about 1798–1800 in the Suisun Bay region of California and lived there the first years of his life. On July 24, 1810, he was baptized at the San Francisco Mission and there adopted the baptismal name of the Spanish saint Francisco Solano. The recorder noted he was a Suisun, about 10 to 12 years old with the native name Sina, and that his father's native name was Sulapy, and his mother was deceased. It also records both his parents as gentiles (meaning not recruited or baptized). Notably, this baptism took place two months after the tragedy of his tribe losing their men in Moraga's 1810 raid on the Suisunes. Sem-Yeto was possibly captured as a child in Moraga's raid of 1810, or else his tribe brought him to the mission to live within two months of the battle due to losing so many adults in the raid. The raid had demoralized the tribe, and instead of fighting or moving inland, many chose to join the mission and stop fighting. Others believe it was more the next year that the move to the mission occurred, giving support to the view that Sina was among the approximately twelve children taken hostage in the battle.

He presumably grew to adulthood at the San Francisco Mission, where he lived for seven years. He learned Spanish at the mission. In the 1820s he reached manhood and became known as the leader of his people, "Sem-Yeto" or "Chief Solano."

== Sonoma (1823–1846) ==
In 1823, Sem-Yeto moved to the present-day town of Sonoma, California, to help build and populate the Mission San Francisco de Solano, along with many of the Suisunes tribe who had grown up at the San Francisco Mission. Mission Solano was the final Franciscan mission north of the San Francisco Bay and built under Mexican rule. Traveling from the San Francisco Mission to the Sonoma Mission was a good move for Suisunes as they were much closer to their homeland at the second mission.

In 1835, however, the Mexican government began to close down and secularize the missions, dispersing the land and properties. General Mariano Guadalupe Vallejo was sent to Sonoma to become the comandante of the new pueblo project, to administer the secularization of the mission, and to keep military control in the region. Sometime that year Sem-Yeto clashed against General Vallejo at Suscol. Although initially successful, Sem-Yeto had to make peace with the Mexicans after Vallejo sent for reinforcements from Monterey. After this, Sem-Yeto and the Suisunes became allies of Vallejo. In addition, he became a very valuable patron and friend to Sem-Yeto.

According to the book Historica de California, their first meeting and treaty was remembered by General Vallejo as taking place in June 1835 on Vallejo's first day arriving into present-day Sonoma County: General Vallejo recounts sailing into Sonoma in 1835, just assigned by the Mexican military to extend Mexican domain in the North Bay to maintain a Mexican stronghold against the Russians at Fort Ross. Vallejo described coming to San Rafael, stopping to form an alliance with a Coast Miwok tribe there, then proceeding past Novato to the rancheria of Captain Pulpula near present-day Schellville where he found over 3,000 curious Native Americans amassed, led by Sem-Yeto. Vallejo pitched tents and dispatched messengers to ask all Native Americans in the region to make treaties with the Mexican government. Vallejo claims that within 48 hours a gathering of 11,000 natives had formed, and only a third of them seemed friendly to him. He remembers Sem-Yeto acted as his interpreter, and remembers how Sem-Yeto urged and harangued the gathering crowds to be friendly to the arriving Mexicans, persuading them that alliance meant Mexican military aid, and suggesting they could better punish enemy tribes. Thus Sem-Yeto not only formed an alliance with the Mexicans, he also gained a following, of many natives in the region in addition to his own tribe, the Suisunes.

Once the alliance with General Vallejo was formed, Sem-Yeto and the Suisunes led many expeditions with the object of quelling the other tribes of the region, the "Wappo, the Satisyomis [aka Sotoyomes, a Wappo tribe], and the Cainameros [aka the South Pomo Indians of Cainama in the region toward Santa Rosa]" who were attempting to throw off Mexican domination. Sem-Yeto led both military expeditions against the other tribes and some peacemaking missions. His main reputation was a man of peace. Sem-Yeto eventually helped to keep the peace between the region's Native Americans and the Mexicans. A peace treaty was signed in 1836.

In order to impress the Mexican government, Vallejo arranged for and sent Sem-Yeto with 100 of his Suisun warriors down to Monterey, California to impress and seek military support from Juan Bautista Alvarado, governor of Alta California (1836–1837, 1838–1842). Sem-Yeto and his warriors traveled the distance but missed meeting Alvarado.

When the smallpox epidemic of 1837 decimated the Native American population of the Sonoma-Marin region, Sem-Yeto was one of the few natives to be vaccinated and thus survived.

Due to his friendship with and support of General Vallejo, Sem-Yeto was one of only two natives to receive a land grant rancho from the Mexican government. (The other native to be granted land was Camilo Ynitia.) In 1842 he received four square leagues known as Rancho Suisun. However, he was not able to retain it for his people after his death; most of the land went to Archibald A. Ritchie in 1857, another section to J.H. Fine. Rancho Suisun was recorded in California state records as follows:

"Suisun (Ritchie) #91-A, Solano Co., Grant of 4 sq. leagues (including Suisun [Fine], #91-B), made in 1842 by Gov. Alvarado to Francisco Solano. Patent for 17,754.73 acres (71.8508 km^{2}) issued in 1857 to Archibald A. Ritchie. In T 5N, R 2W, MDM."
"Suisun (Fine) #91-B, Solano Co., Grant of 4 sq. leagues (including Suisun [Ritchie], #91-A), made in 1842 by Gov. Alvarado to Francisco Solano. Patent for 482.19 acres (1.9514 km^{2}) issued in 1882 to J. H. Fine. In T 5N, R 2W, MDM."

— California Ranchos: Patented Private Land Grants Listed by County, Shumway 1988:105

Sem-Yeto remained a leader of many regional banded tribes and an influential ally and friend of General Vallejo until the Mexicans lost control of the state in 1846.

== California statehood (1846–1850s) ==
In 1846, at the end of the Bear Flag Revolt when California became part of the United States, General Vallejo was taken prisoner by Americans at Sutter's Fort and presumed dead. Sem-Yeto thought he had lost his closest ally, so fled north and found refuge with tribes as far north as Oregon, Washington and possibly Alaska. He returned to California in 1850 and died soon after of pneumonia at the old Yulyul village site in present-day Rockville.

== Legends ==
The following legends exist about the popular chief:

=== Heir of Chief Malica (1817) ===
One legend (unconfirmed) that has been handed down is that Sem-Yeto was the heir of Chief Malica and was present as a child at the tribe's capture and mass suicide of 1817. In this legend, young Sem-Yeto was convinced by Chief Malica to flee the battleground suicide as the rightful leader of the remainder of the tribe, with the few that fled into the hills. For six years, from 1817–1823, Sem-Yeto's whereabouts are not recorded; possibly he lived freely in the hills, or lived with another tribe, or was captured and Christianized, then he turned up to bring the people to the Mission of Sonoma. However for this to be true, Sem-Yeto was not living at the San Francisco Mission all that time. (Note: the battles that Sem-Yeto is alleged to have survived, that of 1810 and 1817, have several similarities: both are a legend of a childhood leader being saved from a fiery battleground death to become the leader of the people. This legend might have conflated two battles into one and placed Sem-Yeto at the scene with Malica, in order to emphasize his leadership of the people.)

=== Gravesite ===
After dying of pneumonia, Chief Solano was reputedly buried under a buckeye tree in the area of Rockville, California; he was also supposedly 6 feet, 7 inches tall, but excavations of local Native American graves have not revealed any unusually tall remains. According to legend his gravesite is on the campus of Solano Community College, where sightings of a tall Native ghost have been reported.

== Recognition ==
In a Fourth of July speech of 1876, General Vallejo describes a deep friendship and appreciation for Sem-Yeto whom he says should be called a prince. The speech was reprinted in The Sonoma Index of December 4, 1880.

A statue of Chief Solano was sculpted by Bill Huff in 1934. It was first mounted on a rock above Cordelia, and was later moved to a library in Fairfield.

Solano County is named directly after Chief (Sem-Yeto) Solano.

== Notes ==
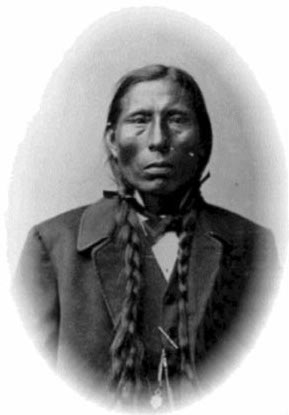
The photo that is commonly but incorrectly captioned as being Chief Solano. This is Mi-Wa-Kan Yu-Ha-La, also known as George Sword, of the Oglala Lakota. 1875

== Sources ==
- Fink, Augusta. Monterey, The Presence of the Past. San Francisco, CA: Chronicle Books, 1972. ISBN 978-8770107204
- The Huntington Library, Early California Population Project Database, 2006.
- Lewis Pub. A Memorial and Biographical History of Northern California. Chicago, IL: Lewis Publishing Co., 1891. (For post-mission era, intertribal battles)
- Lynch, Robert M. The Sonoma Valley Story. Sonoma, CA: Sonoma-Index Tribune, 1997. ISBN 0-9653857-0-1.
- Milliken, Randall. A Time of Little Choice: The Disintegration of Tribal Culture in the San Francisco Bay Area 1769-1910. Menlo Park, CA: Ballena Press Publication, 1995. ISBN 0-87919-132-5 (alk. paper)
- Shumway, Burgess M., California Ranchos: Patented Private Land Grants Listed by County. San Bernardino, CA: The Borgo Press, 1988. ISBN 0-89370-935-2.
- History of Solano County, California
- Sonoma State Historic Park
- Interview with historian Clyde Low on Sem-Yeto and the Patwin Indian presence in Suisun Valley, produced by the City of Fairfield
