= California genocide =

Genocidal massacres of Native Americans

- Part of the California Indian Wars and the Native American genocide in the United States
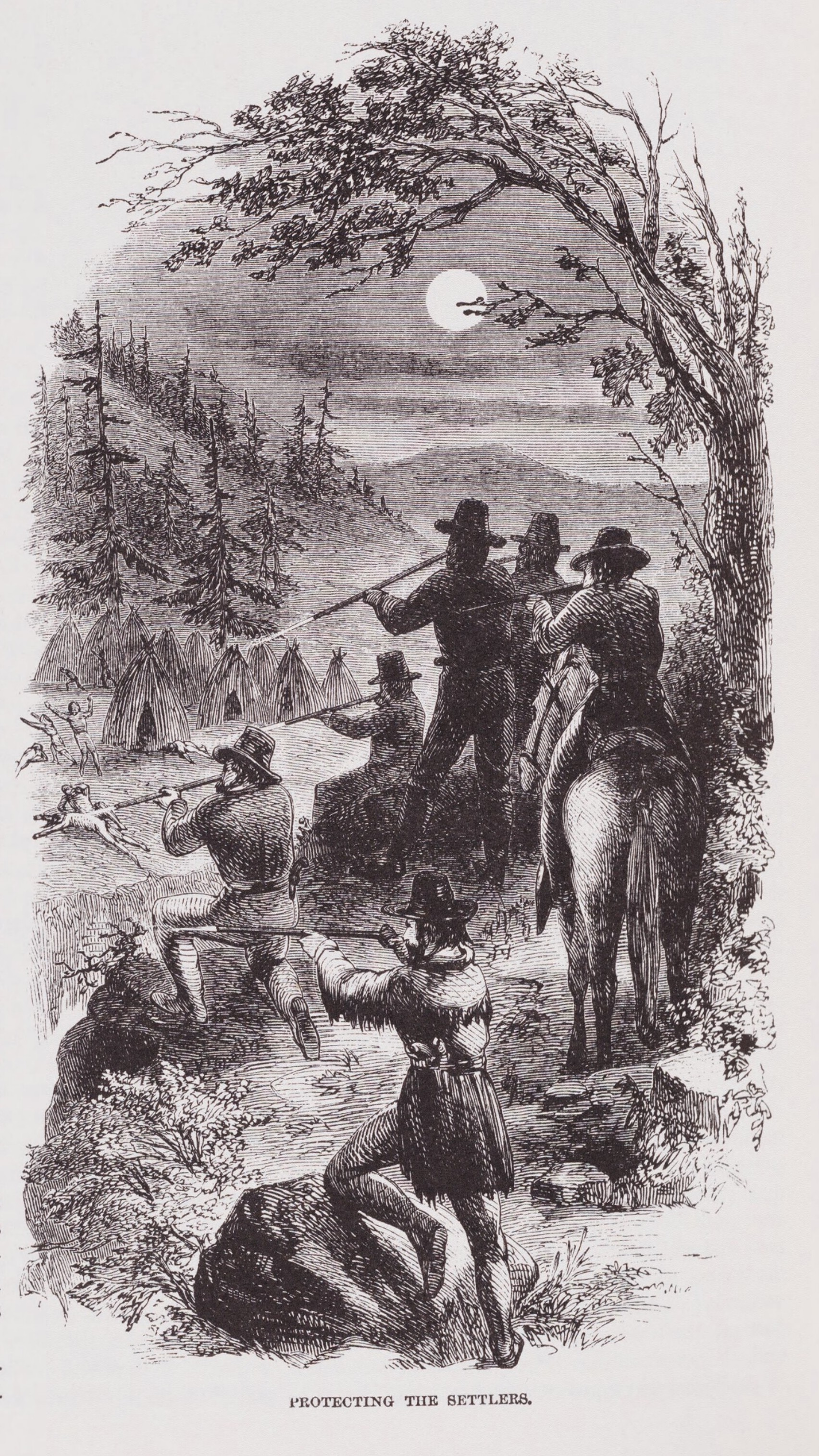
- "Protecting The Settlers", illustration by J. R. Browne in The Indians Of California, 1864
- Location: California
- Date: 1846–1873
- Target: Indigenous Californians
- Attack type: Genocide, ethnic cleansing, human hunting, mass murder, slavery, rape, Indian removal
- Deaths: Estimates for violent deaths: No more than 2,000 (per Anderson); 4,300 (per Cook); 4,500 (per California Secretary of State); 9,492–16,094 (per Madley)
- Injuries: 10,000–27,000 taken as forced laborers by white settlers; 4,000–7,000 of them children
- Victims: ▼80% (1846–1870) The genocide accelerated the decline of the Indigenous population, which decreased from 150,000 to 30,000.
- Perpetrators: United States Army, California Militia, American pioneers
- Motive: Settler colonialism

The California genocide was a series of genocidal massacres of the Indigenous peoples of California by United States governments, soldiers and settlers during the 19th century. It began following the American conquest of California in the Mexican–American War and the subsequent influx of American settlers to the region as a result of the California gold rush. Between 1846 and 1873, it is estimated that settlers killed between 9,492 and 16,094 Californian Natives; up to several thousand were also starved to death or worked to death. Forced labor, kidnapping, rape, child separation, and forced displacement were widespread during the genocide, and were encouraged, tolerated, and even carried out by California government officials, American government officials, and military commanders.

Prior to the Spanish arrival, California's Indigenous population was estimated as high as 300,000. It decreased further from roughly 150,000 in 1848 to 30,000 in 1870 and 16,000 by 1900 as a result of disease, low birth rates, starvation, and genocide. Between 10,000 and 27,000 were also subject to forced labor by U.S. settlers, with California officials repeatedly passing legislation which disenfranchised Californian Indians.

Since the 2000s, historians have characterized the period immediately following the conquest of California as one in which U.S. miners, farmers, and ranchers on the American frontier engaged in the systematic genocide of Californian Indians. In 2019, the governor of California, Gavin Newsom, described the events as "genocide", adding, "...that's the way it needs to be described in the history books." He also apologized for the "violence, discrimination and exploitation sanctioned by state government throughout its history". In a 2019 executive order, Newsom announced the formation of a "Truth and Healing Council" to better understand the genocide and inform future generations of what occurred.

== Background ==
=== Indigenous Californians ===
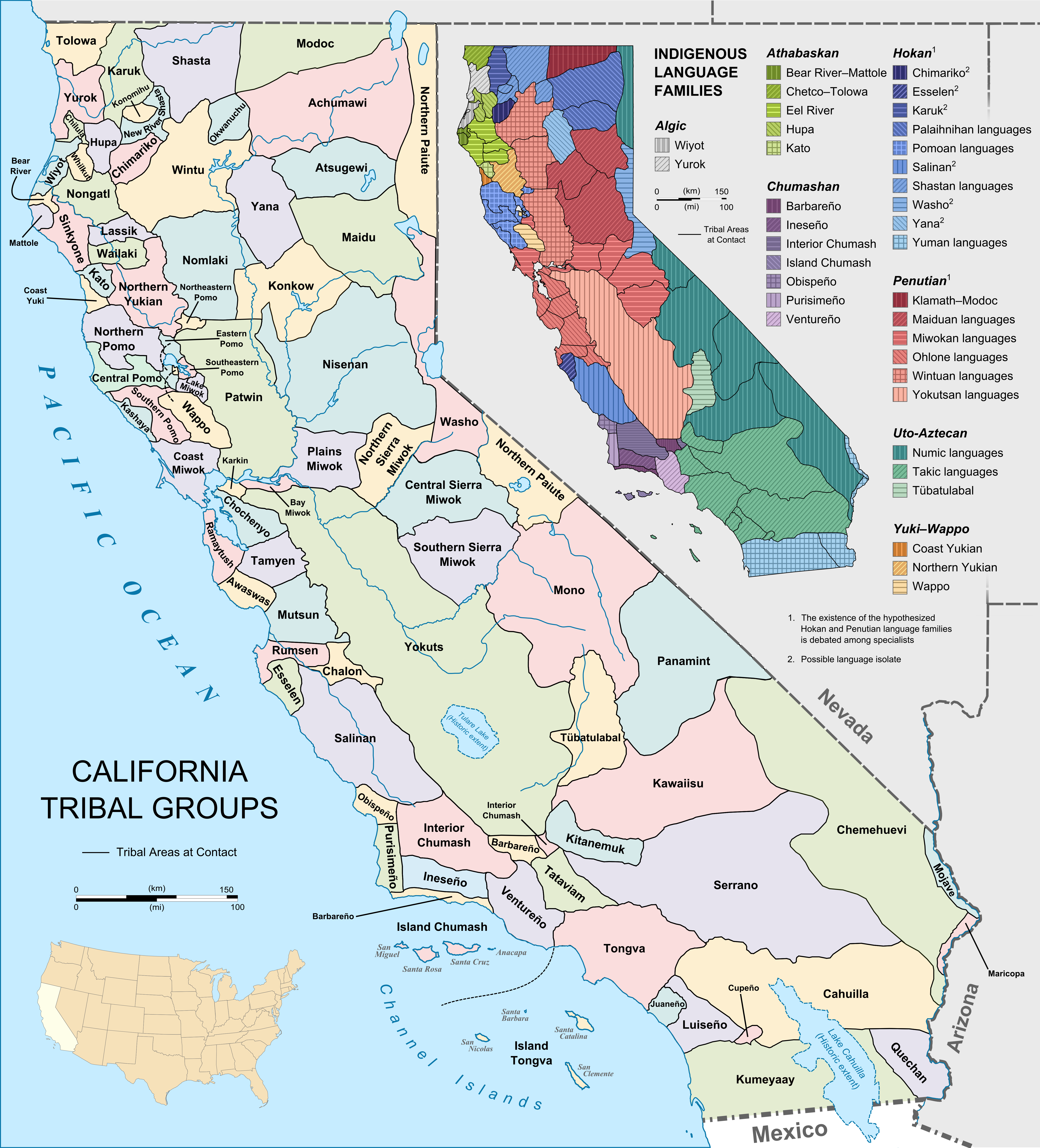
Ethnic and (inset) linguistic groups of California prior to European arrival

Prior to Spanish arrival, California was home to an American Indian population thought to have been as high as 300,000. The largest group were the Chumash people, with a population around 10,000. The region was highly diverse, with numerous distinct languages spoken. While there was great diversity in the area, archeological findings show little evidence of intertribal conflicts.

The various tribal groups appear to have adapted to particular areas and territories. According to journalist Nathan Gilles, because of traditions practiced by the Native people of Northern California, they were able to "manage the threat of wildfires and cultivate traditional plants". For example, traditional use of fire by Californian and Pacific Northwest tribes, allowed them to "cultivate plants and fungi" that "adapted to regular burning. The list runs from fiber sources, such as bear-grass and willow, to foodstuffs, such as berries, mushrooms, and acorns from oak trees that once made up sprawling orchards". Many practices were used to manage the land without tremendous destruction in other ways including "tillage, pruning, seed broadcasting, transplanting, weeding, irrigation, and fertilizing". These groups worked to stimulate the growth and diversity of botanical resources across landscapes. Traditional practices allowed for the "extraordinarily successful management of natural resources available to Native Californian tribes". Because of traditional practices of Native Californian tribes, they were able to support habitats and climates that would then support an abundance of wildlife, including rabbits, deer, varieties of fish, fruit, roots, and acorns. The Native people largely followed a hunter-gatherer lifestyle, moving around their area through the seasons as different types of food were available.

The American Indian people of California, according to sociologist Kari Norgaard, were "hunting and fishing for their food, weaving baskets using traditional techniques" and "carrying out important ceremonies to keep the world intact". It was also recorded that the American Indian people in California and across the continent had used "fire to enhance specific plant species, optimize hunting conditions, maintain open travel routes, and generally support the flourishing of the species upon which they depend, according to scholars like the United States Forest Service ecologist and Karuk descendent Frank Lake".

=== European contact ===
California was one of the last regions in the Americas to be colonized by European colonists. Spanish Catholic missionaries, led by Franciscan administrator Junípero Serra and military forces under the command of officer Gaspar de Portolá, did not reach this area until 1769. The mission was intended to spread the Catholic faith among the region's American Indian population and establish and expand the reach of the Spanish Empire. The Spanish built San Diego de Alcalá, the first of 21 missions standing in modern-day California, at what developed as present-day San Diego in the southern part of the state along the Pacific. (The Spanish also built 30 missions and 11 visitas in Baja California.) Military outposts were constructed to house the soldiers sent to protect the missions.

Before American rule, Spanish and Mexican rule were devastating for the American Indian populations, and "as the missions grew, California's Native population of Indians began a catastrophic decline." Gregory Orfalea estimates that pre-contact population was reduced by 33% during the Spanish and Mexican regimes. Most of the decline stemmed from imported diseases, low birth rates, and the disruption of traditional ways of life, but violence was common, and some historians have charged that life in the missions was close to slavery. According to George Tinker, an American Indian scholar, "the Native American population of coastal population was reduced by some 90 percent during seventy years under the sole proprietorship of Serra's mission system".

According to journalist Ed Castillo, member of the Native American Caucus of the California Democratic Party, Serra spread the Christian faith among the Native population in a destructive way that caused their population to decline rapidly while he was in power. Castillo writes that "The Franciscans took it upon themselves to brutalize the Indians, and to rejoice in their death...They simply wanted the souls of these Indians, so they baptized them, and when they died, from disease or beatings... they were going to heaven, which was a cause of celebration". According to Castillo, the Native American population were forced to abandon their "sustainable and complex civilization" as well as "their beliefs, their faith, and their way of life". However, artifacts found at an archaeological site on San Clemente Island suggested that a group of Indigenous people were practicing traditional ways after the arrival of Europeans and Americans in other parts of California, and until potentially the 1850s. The artifacts included subsistence remains, middens, and flaked stone tools.

=== Timeline ===
The following is a rough timeline of some of the key events and policies that contributed to the genocide. It is by no means comprehensive.

- 1542: California is discovered by Spain. Juan Rodríguez Cabrillo, a Portuguese explorer sailing under the Spanish flag, explores the California coast and lands in San Diego Harbor, naming it San Miguel. His crew peacefully interacts with Kumeyaay people for six days trading goods and discussing cultural differences. The larger California area is named from a fictional paradise described in the early 16th-century novel "Las Sergas de Esplandián" by Garci Rodríguez de Montalvo.
- 1769: Spanish colonizers extended the Mexican Catholic mission system into the mission system in California, which led to the forced conversion and enslavement of California area Native Americans.
- 1821–1823: Mexico gained independence from Spain and took control of California, continuing the Spanish government's policies of forced labor and conversion of Indigenous peoples.
- 1845–1846: John C. Frémont leads US Attacks against Native Americans in California and Oregon Country. Frémont is employed by US Senator Thomas Hart Benton and US President Andrew Jackson to explore land routes to California and prepare to conquer the territory from Mexico. Frémont travels Northern California, committing several Native massacres along the way.
- 1846–1848: The Mexican–American War led to the annexation of California by the United States. The settlers and U.S. military formed an alliance and were joined by some Indigenous people, although the military had "murdered many Natives". After the war Commodore Robert F. Stockton appointed John C. Frémont military governor of the Territory of California.
- 1848: The discovery of gold in California led to the influx of a massive horde of settlers, who formed militias to kill and displace Indigenous peoples.
- 1850: The California Act for the Government and Protection of Indians was passed, legalizing the enslavement of Native Americans and allowing settlers to capture and force them into labor.
- 1851–1852: The Mariposa War broke out between white settlers and the Ahwahnechee, resulting in the displacement and killing of Native Americans by the Mariposa Battalion in the Sierra Nevada region.
- 1851–1866: Shasta city and the communities of Marysville and Honey Lake paid bounties for the killing of Native Americans.
- 1860s: The federal government began a policy of forced removal of Native Americans peoples to reservations, which led to violence and displacement.
- Late 1800s–early 1900s: Indigenous children were forcibly removed from their families by the California government and placed in boarding schools, where they were subjected to abuse and forced assimilation.
- 1909: The California state government established the California Eugenics Record Office, which promoted the forced sterilization of people declared by the government to be "unfit", including "Black, Latino and Indigenous women who were incarcerated or in state institutions for disabilities".

== History ==
=== 1846–1850 ===
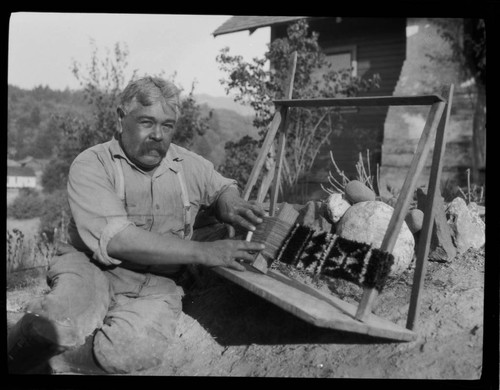
William Ralganal Benson, Pomo basket maker who published a Pomo narrative on the Bloody Island massacre in Clear Lake.

Starting with the conquest of California in 1846, early US incursions into Alta California, then a part of Mexico, saw several massacres take place. Military expeditions led by John C. Fremont saw the earliest massacres of California Indigenous peoples orchestrated by US forces. In April 1846, the first of these massacres occurred on the Sacramento River against the Wintu, which killed anywhere from 150 to 1000 people. Later that month, Fremont's contingent was attacked by the Klamath leading to two or three deaths. As a result, massacres took place against the Klamath. A total of 14 people were killed. More massacres would be perpetrated by Fremont throughout his campaign in California. At that time, non-Indigenous settlers were outnumbered 15 to 1 in California.

In 1847, John Sutter was appointed the first federal Indian Subagent in California. As Subagent, Sutter was known to participate extensively in the human trafficking of Indigenous Californians. Sutter had kidnapped over two thousand people to work at his ranch in near slave like conditions. The workers were often from the Pomo and Nisenan tribes. Sutter had ordered those around him to keep the Natives under fear. The conditions at the Sutter Ranch were very poor.

Over the course of 1848, gold miners poured into California from other parts of the US, bringing further violence. The Whitman massacre in Oregon spurred revenge killings against Indigenous communities in California. As violence escalated, more settlers arrived 1849. This wave of immigration popularized the term "forty niners" for gold miners in California. That year, Pomo, and Wappo laborers killed rancher Andrew Kelsey, a man known for selling indentured Native people.

==== Quechan war ====
In late 1849, the Quechan people came into conflict with white outlaws known as the Glanton gang in Southern California, who ran competing ferrying businesses. The gang committed numerous crimes on local Natives and Mexicans living in the area. In part due to the brutality of these outlaws, some settlers reached a deal with the Quechan to run a ferrying business for a quarter of the price that the gang charged. The outlaws killed an Irish ferryman named Callaghan who was ferrying people on behalf of the Quechan and had threatened the tribe. The Quechan attempted to negotiate a compromise, but were beaten by the outlaws in response.

In 1850, the gang's leader, John Glanton, and 10 others were killed by the Quechan. Soon afterwards the government of California would respond, organizing the first state supported militia campaign against California Natives. The Gila Expedition would lead to a massacre of Quechan people and would be used as a model for later operations. Other massacres would take place that year in places such as Clear Lake, Mendocino, and other areas in the northern regions of California.

=== 1851–1855 ===
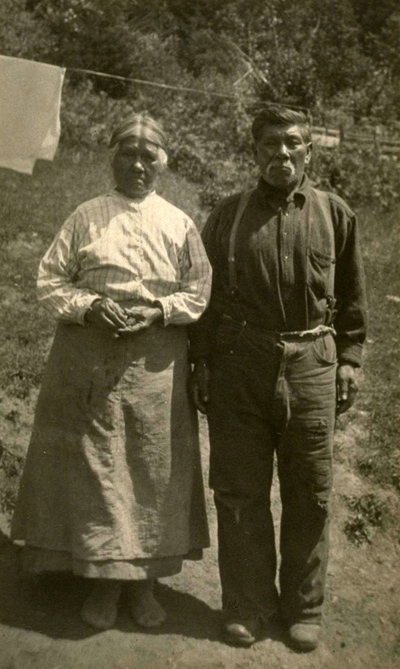
Sally Bell, a survivor of the Needle Rock massacre, standing next to her husband.

In 1851, numerous treaties were negotiated with California tribes, though none were ratified. Tribes were required to sign and acknowledge such agreements. Resistance to the treaty process was often met with violence, as happened to the Yokuts, who refused to attend treaty negotiations.

The 1850 "Act for the Government and Protection of the Indian" legalized the indentured servitude of Indigenous children in California, as well as Indigenous people who had committed "Indian crimes." The act intensified the kidnapping and forced labor of Indigenous Californians. As conditions worsened, calls were made for a "war of extermination" by governor Peter Burnett in 1851; Burnett had argued the extinction of Natives was inevitable and nearing.

==== Mariposa war ====
As conflicts worsened, Cupeño leader Antonio Garra launched a rebellion against the US. Initially having hoped to negotiate with the settlers, Garra lost patience after taxes were forcibly imposed on the Cupeño and called for an uprising of local Indigenous nations, inviting Hispanic Californians to join him. The short lived rebellion lasted only a few months before the Cahuilla leader Juan Antonio captured Garra and handed him over to American forces. The rebellion served to heighten settler panic.

The Mariposa War which targeted the Yokuts, Miwok, and Paiute peoples in the Yosemite region, was one of the major early conflicts of the genocide. Over the course of the war, the Mariposa Battalion carried out massacres against those Indigenous communities living within what is now the modern day Yosemite National Park.

The head of the Mariposa Battalion, trader James Savage, having learned that some of the tribes wished to fight the settlers, warned that:

It is better for the Indians and white men to be friends, if the Indians make war on the white men every tribe will be exterminated; not one will be left. I have just been where the white men are more numerous than wasps and ants; and if war is made and the Americans are aroused to anger, every Indian engaged in the war will be killed before the whites will be satisfied.

Savage dismissed attempts to resolve the war through treaties, arguing that tribes in the mountains would continue to resist. He blamed the Treaty Commission for temporarily preventing further attacks by the Mariposa Battalion, claiming that this led to the deaths of eight settlers. Savage also prevented treaty negotiations with the Ahwahneechee, who had sought negotiations, by telling the Treaty Commissioner that their interest was simply a ploy to ambush Savage.

The war continued, with the Mariposa Battalion's primary strategy being to starve out resisting tribes by burning their food supplies. The Mariposa War largely ended when Ahwahneechee leader Tenaya was captured. Soon after the tribe was marched to Fresno. Expeditions and massacres would take place targeting the Nissenan,Wintu, Yana, Nomlaki, and Modoc as well, in 1851. These actions were somewhat subdued by the Treaty Commission who were hoping to secure agreements that year.

==== Northern California conflicts ====
In 1852, due to the previous year's massacres by settlers, Modoc began attacking emigrant caravans which passed through their territory. Several massacres of these caravans took place as a result of this, such as at Bloody Point. Ben Wright, a settler who had participated in previous massacres against the Modoc, called for a truce. When individuals from the tribe came down to negotiate, Wright massacred all those who had arrived. Those killed included the father of future Modoc leader Captain Jack, the death toll was said to be between 30 and 90.

Wright was later killed by a Rogue River Indian man named Enos, after Wright had sexually assaulted an indigenous woman who worked as an interpreter. Enos was soon hanged for the murder. The treaties signed in 1851 were rejected in 1852, when the California Senate voted against ratification. Reasonings given included, that the senators believed too much land granted to the tribes and much of the granted lands were rich in minerals which could be mined and should not be controlled by indigenous communities. Additional massacres occurred throughout 1852 in Northern California, such as those against Shasta, Tolowa, Wintu, and Sinkyone people, killing hundreds.

In 1853, a letter sent to the Superintendent of Indian Affairs in California by a district attorney outlined the conditions in which native indentured laborers, particularly those kidnapped from Clear Lake, were living. The letter stated that many who were kidnapped and brought to ranches in Napa County had already died due to the inhumane conditions. The Superintendent later forwarded this information to the Secretary of the Interior and added that the Indigenous population of California in 1853 was between 75k-100k. Superintendent Edward Beale would write to the secretary of Interior:

The unanimity of the vote for hanging the old man is, with me, no sign of its justice; and as for his courage in dying, that is natural to the Indian character, and especially in these California Indians, who are reduced to despair—their country, and all support, taken away from them; no resting-place, where they can be safe; death on one hand from starvation, and on the other by killing and hanging.

In 1853, there were documented instances of settlers attempting to infect Native Californians with smallpox, there was also multiple cases of Natives being deliberately poisoned by settlers, poisoned food was left out for the starving Indigenous people to find and eat, this would lead to their death. Several massacres occurred that year, the largest being the Yontocket massacre against the Tolowa. Settlers surrounded the village of Yontocket, the largest village of the Tolowa, where many had gathered for a religious ceremony. They set fire to the village and shot those who tried to escape, the death toll was anywhere from 150 to 600. Smaller massacres would take place elsewhere throughout the year.

In 1854, an act was passed banning Indigenous Californians from owning firearms, possession of firearms resulted in a fine, and a one to six-month prison sentence, this law would remain in effect till 1913. During this period, the Shasta Expedition would lead to further massacres, sporadic killings continued elsewhere. The winter months saw a rise in conflict, after settlers attempted to assault a Karuk girl, four settlers were killed by the Karuk in retaliation. The Klamath River War began when settlers tried to forcibly disarm the Indigenous people in the region and met resistance.

The war continued into 1855, after two Natives were killed along the Salmon River, the tribes fled to the mountains. Later retaliatory attacks would kill 22 settlers on the same day. The Klamath River War would be a predecessor to the Bald Hills War. From 1855 onwards, it became an increasingly common practice for Indigenous people to be kidnapped from reservations and forced into indentured servitude, particularly women and children. A report issued that year accused the officials who ran the Reservations as being highly corrupt.

=== 1856–1860 ===
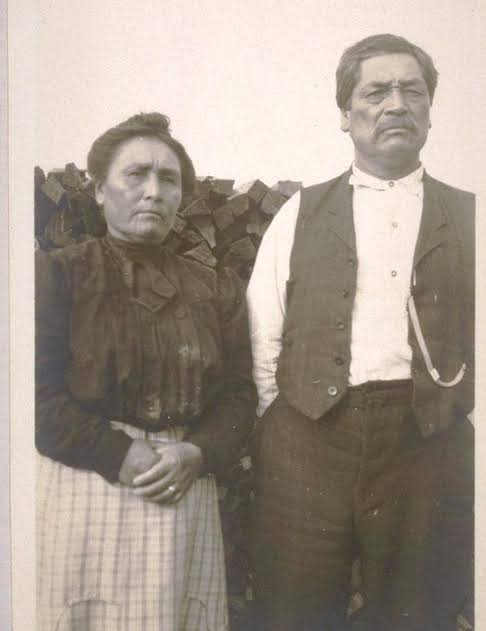
Jerry James, a survivor of the Indian Island massacre as an infant, standing next to his wife.

In 1856, Indigenous people living in San Diego faced significant danger. Public lynchings occurred, it was a frequent practice for police in Southern California to kill Natives who had not yet been trialled by hanging them in their cell. Starving Yokuts who engaged in cattle rustling were attacked by militiamen, after a number of operations, 14 Yokuts had been killed. Soon afterward, militiamen received intelligence of a large Yokut gathering and planned an ambush. Although taken by surprise, the Yokuts managed to repel the ambush and they retaliated by following the retreating militia and burning settler houses and property. That same year, California militiamen killed 185 Indigenous people during the Modoc expedition. "Slave marts" were reported to be operating in Los Angeles, selling Indigenous Indentured laborers.

==== Bald Hills war and Round Valley massacres ====
In 1857, massacres intensified in Mendocino and the Round Valley region, where settlers were encouraged to settle by the California Superintendent of Indian Affairs. One of the earliest settlers killed by the Yuki was William Mantle, Mantle was known to keep "Pet Indians" who were individuals that had been kidnapped from Round Valley and forced into labor. A total of 14 Yuki were killed in retaliation for his murder. That year, a massacre of the Yahi people saw 50 people killed, while 81 Achumawi people, and 10 Washoe were killed in numerous separate massacres. Throughout these operations no settlers were killed.

By 1858, Indigenous Californians living in settler towns often subsisted off discarded food, and many Indigenous women were forced into prostitution. Women who were kidnapped were frequently forced into sexual exploitation and attempts by tribes to resist these actions caused further violence. Starvation was widespread on reservations in California, on the Round Valley reservation, eight to ten people were dying per day to syphilis and inadequate rations. Hunger frequently drove Natives to killing livestock, which would lead to further attacks on Native villages.

Massacres in Round Valley between 1858 and 1860 killed more than 500 people. The term "Indian depredations" was commonly used around Mendocino and Round Valley to justify attacks on Native communities, although oftentimes livestock deaths came from other causes. The Wintoon War lead to at least 200 deaths and forced 6 tribes to relocate onto reservations. The Mendocino War followed soon after, the immediate catalyst was the killing of three horses by the Yuki, one of which being a prized stallion. Much of the violence committed against Indigenous Californians in Mendocino between 1859 and 1860 was done by a militia known as the Eel River Rangers, organized by a prominent "Indian Hunter" Walter Jarboe.

In the aftermath of the horse killings, a two-week operation by settlers in Round Valley killed over 240 Indigenous people. The Eel River Rangers were known to consume local cattle during their operations. Settlers worried they would not be compensated for this loss of cattle. In 1859, an Indigenous boy, who was between 12 and 15 years old, was lynched in Tehama County after being accused of setting fire to his master, Col Stevenson's home, leading to at least seven deaths. Expeditions were done against the Yana and Maidu in retaliation for the fire, leading to the deaths of at least 42 Yana and Maidu. Expeditions along the Pit River that year resulted in hundreds more deaths among Indigenous communities.

In early 1860, a large massacre targeted the Wiyot. Although Wiyot had maintained peaceful relations with settlers prior, over 285 were killed within a week. Additional massacres took place in northeastern California throughout the year. In Round Valley, the practice of settler raiding parties routinely kidnapping women and children was common. Amendments to the Act for the Government and Protection of Indians resulted in the age of majority altered for indigenous minors from 18 to 25 for boys, and 15 to 21 for girls respectively.

=== 1861–1865 ===
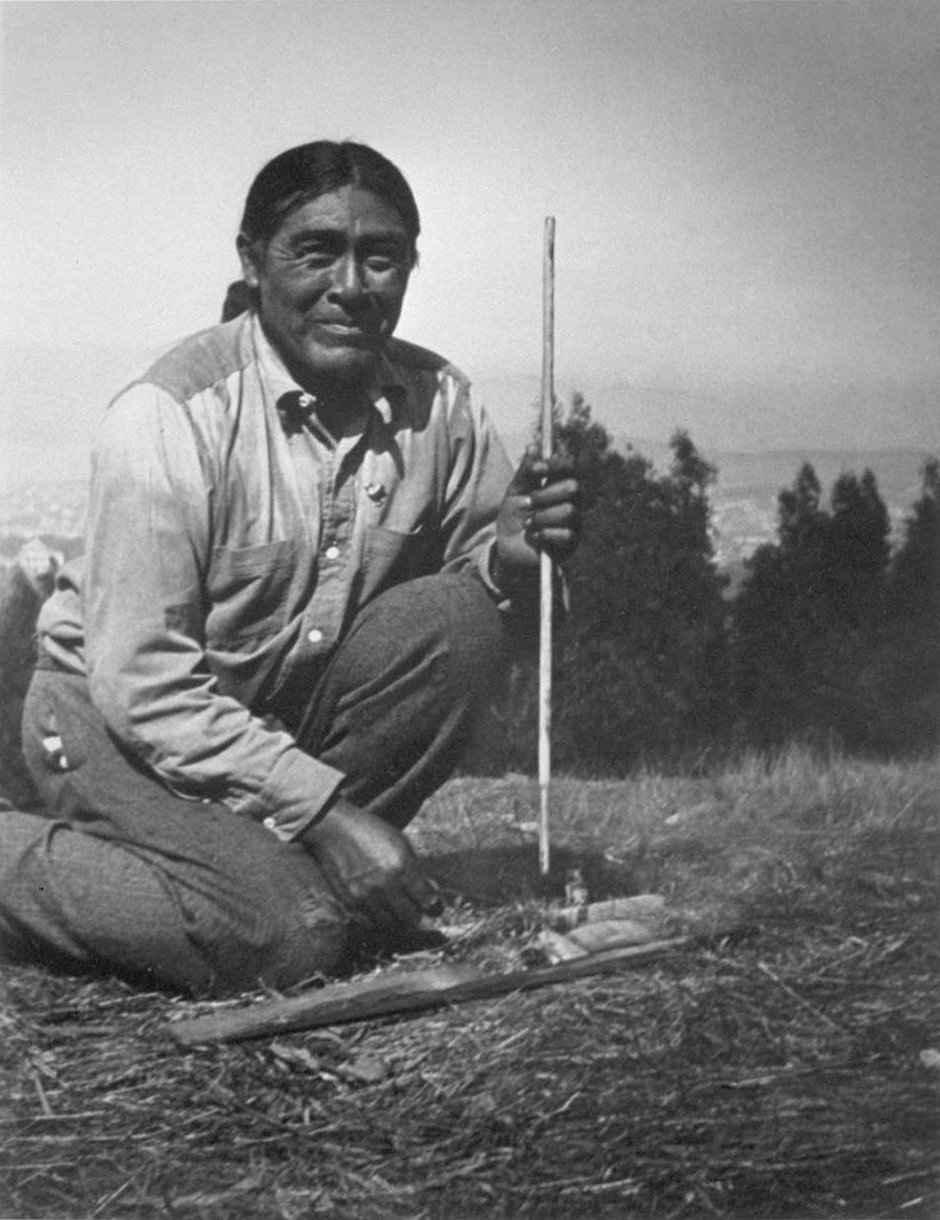
Ishi, the last known member of the Yahi.

In 1861, forced labor was widespread in Round Valley. Orphaned children of massacre victims were prime targets to be taken by settlers. Two Yuki boys tried poisoning their master, the former California Superintendent of Indian Affairs, Thomas Hanley. Hanley, after discovering the poison, found one of the children and hanged them in public. The Horse Canyon massacre in Mendocino killed up to 200 Wailaki people, the massacre was carried out after the Wailaki had killed livestock. Konkow Maidu were persuaded to participate in the massacre by settlers, and the Round Valley Reservation Superintendent, despite not wishing to do so.

In 1862, a trial took place involving George H. Woodman, a prominent kidnapper of Indigenous children in Mendocino County, during the trial. Over 40 people testified to Woodman's innocence, arguing he saved starving children from turning to theft or "being shot like coyotes." Other witnesses, however, noted that he held exhibitions, in which he displayed his "little brown cubs," commanding them to "lie down" or "roll over" like a dog.

Conditions in Round Valley deteriorated further, and multiple massacres occurred, the largest of which killed 45 Wailaki people. The Konkow fled the reservation that winter. Facing starvation, and aware that killing settler livestock would provoke massacres, they chose to make the journey back to their homelands in Butte County. The Yahi had killed three children that year, sparking outrage.

In 1863, the Konkow Maidu were forced to undertake a return march to Round Valley. the Yahi were implicated in further raids, and the murder of two more children. In 1864, massacres would continue along the Sacramento River, targeting the Yana, Achumawi and other tribes. The death toll would be 361. Yahi in Northern California would continue to face massacres from 1865 to 1871, resulting in over 200 deaths.

==== Owens Valley war ====
In 1862, Owens Valley Paiutes began raiding settler livestock. The livestock, which had consumed and destroyed much of the Valley's resources, forced the Paiutes into food scarcity. Settlers responded by raping three Paiute women. After Paiutes killed two settlers, a retaliatory massacre resulted in the deaths of over 73 Paiutes and the burning of a village. Further skirmishes lead to costly victories for the Paiutes. Although managing to defend their villages from settlers, they suffered many casualties while doing so. Tribes elsewhere in Southern California, including Tejon, were reported to have aided the Owens Valley Paiutes.

In 1863, Paiutes in Owens Valley murdered three settlers, and two soldiers soon afterwards. Settlers responded with further massacres. By April, 150 Paiutes had been killed. In May, the Owens Valley Paiutes surrendered. Starvation led Owen Valley Paiutes to kill cattle, reigniting conflict the following year. In 1865, over 100 Paiutes were coralled and killed in a single incident. Sporadic killings would continue into 1866.

== Consequences for Native populations ==
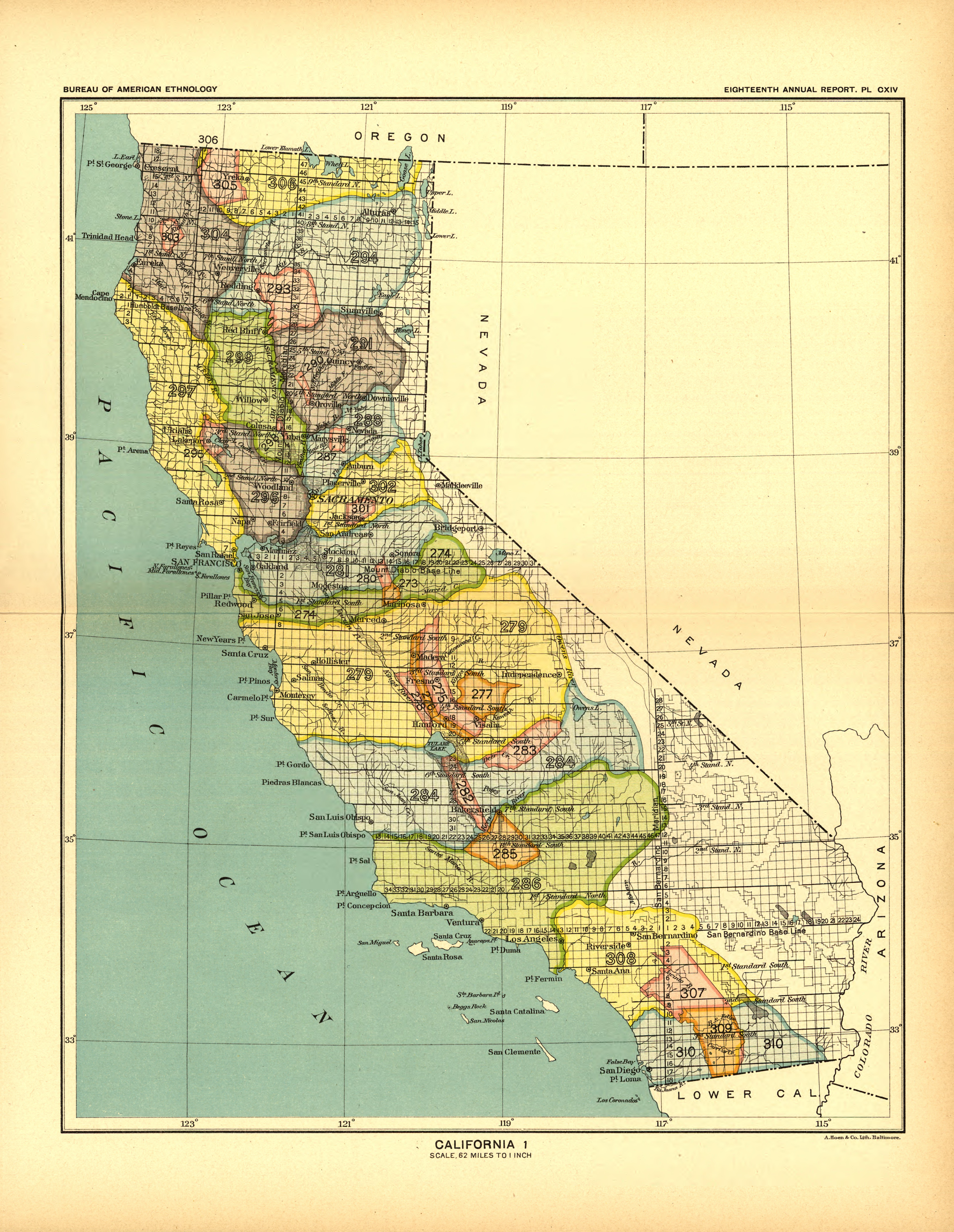
Map of California from Indian Land Cessions in the United States

Following the American Conquest of California from Mexico, the influx of American settlers due to the California Gold Rush in 1849, and the statehood of California in 1850, state and federal authorities incited, aided, and financed the violence against the American Indians. The California Natives were also sometimes contemptuously referred to as "Diggers", for their practice of digging up roots to eat. On January 6, 1851, at his State of the State address to the California Senate, 1st Governor of California, Peter Burnett said: "That a war of extermination will continue to be waged between the races until the Indian race becomes extinct must be expected. While we cannot anticipate this result but with painful regret, the inevitable destiny of the race is beyond the power or wisdom of man to avert." During the California genocide, reports of the decimation of American Indians in California were made to the rest of the United States and internationally.

I have the honor to report to the general commanding the Department of the Pacific that I have been in this valley fifteen days, carrying out my instructions to chastise these Indians, or the Indians of Owens River; that I have killed several, taken eleven prisoners, and destroyed a great many rancherias and a large quantity of seeds, worms, &c., that the Indians had gathered for food.

— George S. Evans, Lieutenant-Colonel Second Cavalry California Volunteers, Commanding Owens River Expedition (1862), War of the Rebellion: Operations on the Pacific Coast. Chapter LXII.

A notable early eyewitness testimony and account: "The Indians of California" (1864) is from John Ross Browne, Customs official and Inspector of Indian Affairs on the Pacific Coast. He systematically described the fraud, corruption, land theft, slavery, rape, and massacre perpetrated on a substantial portion of the aboriginal population. This was confirmed by a contemporary, Superintendent Dorcas J. Spencer.

=== Forced labor ===
The California Act for the Government and Protection of Indians was enacted in 1850 (amended 1860, repealed 1863). This law provided for "apprenticing" or indenturing Indian children to white settlers, and also punished "vagrant" Indians by "hiring" them out to the highest bidder at a public auction if the Indian could not provide sufficient bond or bail. This legalized a form of slavery in California. Settlers took 10,000 to 27,000 California Native Americans as forced laborers, including 4,000 to 7,000 children.

Prior to 1850, instances of forced indenture of Indigenous Californians were already occurring amongst American settlers. The first federal Indian subagent, John Sutter, owned up to 2000 indentured workers in 1847. In 1848, the New York Herald commented that Indigenous people in California were being held in conditions akin to slavery, and were regularly punished and flogged. High mortality rates were common among indentured laborers in California. Indigenous Indentured labor was driven primarily by a worker shortage created by the gold rush, with most settlers working in the gold fields, Indigenous people were forced to fill the gaps in the workforce. Indigenous children were often kidnapped and sold in towns far from their communities, at auctions. At these auctions, Natives were generally sold for between $50 to $250 each. The indenture of children served to deprive them of their families and culture.

=== Starvation and disease ===
Starvation was acute during the California genocide, and led to a large number of deaths amongst the Indigenous population. Reservations experienced large losses of life due to starvation. At the Round Valley Reservation, the population had fallen from 3,450 to 250 between 1857 and 1858, with a large portion having died from starvation. Those at the reservation who were unable to work were not given food. Indigenous food sources were destroyed by settler fisheries, and the depletion of local wildlife. In 1852, it was stated in the Senate, that the Superintendent of Indian Affairs had received information, that over 15,000 Natives had died of starvation in California the previous year.

Diseases were widespread, and many died after having already been weakened by malnutrition. Indigenous women commonly contracted sexually transmitted infections(STIs), which often proved fatal, and were often due to prostitution, into which women were reportedly forced into by officials and reservation employees.The Nome Cult Farm was particularly known for lack of food and prevalence of STIs.

=== Violence statistics ===
In 1943, a study by demographer Sherburne Cook, estimated that there were 4,556 killings of California Indians between 1847 and 1865. Contemporary historian Benjamin Madley has documented the numbers of Californian Indians killed between 1846 and 1873; he estimates that during this period at least 9,492 to 16,092 Californian Indians were killed by non-Indians, including between 1,680 and 3,741 killed by the U.S. Army. Most of the deaths took place in what he defined as more than 370 massacres (defined as the "intentional killing of five or more disarmed combatants or largely unarmed noncombatants, including women, children, and prisoners, whether in the context of a battle or otherwise"). Madley also estimates that fewer than 1,400 non-Indians were killed by Indians during this period. The Native American activist and former Sonoma State University Professor Ed Castillo was asked by The State of California's Native American Heritage Commission to write the state's official history of the genocide; he wrote that "well-armed death squads combined with the widespread random killing of Indians by individual miners resulted in the death of 100,000 Indians in [1848 and 1849]." Another contemporary historian, Gary Clayton Anderson, estimated that no more than 2,000 Native Americans were killed in California. Jeffrey Ostler has critiqued Anderson's estimate, calling it "unsubstantiated" and "at least five times too low". In the early 1850s, the California legislature authorized payment for multiple expeditions against the Native Americans of California. Some scholars believe that state legislators and officials "created a legal environment in which California Indians had almost no rights, thus granting those who attacked them virtual impunity which is defined as freedom from punishment." In addition, state legislators raised up to $1.51 million to pay for state militia expeditions against California Native Americans.

=== List of recorded massacres ===
| Year | Date | Name | Current location | Description | Reported casualties | References |
|---|---|---|---|---|---|---|
| 1846 | April 6 | Sacramento River massacre | Sacramento River in Shasta County, Northern California | Captain John C. Frémont's men attacked a band of Indians (probably Wintun) on the Sacramento River in California, killing between 120 and 200 Indians. | 120–200 | Madley, 2016 p. 49–50 |
| 1846 | June | Sutter Buttes massacre | Sutter Buttes in Sutter County, Northern California | Captain John C. Frémont's men attacked a rancheria on the banks of the Sacramento River near Sutter Buttes, killing several Patwin people. | 14+ | |
| 1846 | December | Pauma massacre | Pauma Valley in San Diego County, Southern California | 11 Californios captured at Rancho Pauma were killed as horse thieves by Indians at Warner Springs, California, leading to the Temecula massacre. | 11 (settlers) | |
| 1846 | December | Temecula massacre | Temecula in Riverside County, Southern California | 33 to 40 Luiseño Indians killed in an ambush in revenge for the Pauma Massacre east of Temecula, California. | 33–40 | |
| 1847 | March | Rancheria Tulea massacre | Napa Valley in Napa County, Northern California | White slavers retaliate to a slave escape by massacring five Indians in Rancheria Tulea. | 5 | |
| 1847 | March 29 | Kern and Sutter massacres | Mill Creek in Tehama County, Northern California | In response to a plea from white settlers to put an end to raids, U.S. Army Captain Edward Kern and rancher John Sutter led 50 men in attacks on three Indian villages. | 20 | Madley, 2016 p. 62 |
| 1847 | late June/early July | Konkow Maidu slaver massacre | Chico in Butte County, Northern California | Slavers kill 12–20 Konkow Maidu Indians in the process of capturing 30 members of the tribe for the purpose of forced slavery. | 12–20 | Madley, 2016 p. 64 |
| 1850 | May 15 | Bloody Island massacre | Clear Lake in Lake County, Northern California | Nathaniel Lyon and his U.S. Army detachment of cavalry killed 60–100 Pomo people (possibly more, by other accounts) on Bo-no-po-ti island near Upper Lake; they believed the tribe had killed Andrew Kelsey and Charles Stone, two Clear Lake settlers who had been abusing and murdering Pomo and Wappo people. (The Island Pomo had no connections to the enslaved Pomo.) This incident led to a general outbreak of settler attacks against and mass killing of Native people all over Northern California. The site is now California Registered Historical Landmark #427. | 60–100 | |
| 1851 | January 11 | Mariposa War | Various sites in Mariposa County, Northern California | The gold rush increased pressure on the Native Americans of California, because miners forced Native Americans off their gold-rich lands. Many were pressed into service in the mines; others had their villages raided by the army and volunteer militia. Some Native American tribes fought back, beginning with the Ahwahnechees and the Chowchilla in the Sierra Nevada and San Joaquin Valley leading a raid on the Fresno River post of James D. Savage, in December 1850. In retaliation Mariposa County Sheriff James Burney led local militia in an indecisive clash with Native people on January 11, 1851, on a mountainside near present-day Oakhurst, California. | 40+ | |
| 1851 | | Old Shasta Town Massacre | Shasta in Shasta County, Northern California | Miners killed 300 Wintu Indians near Old Shasta, California and burned down their tribal council meeting house. | 300 | |
| 1852 | April 23 | Bridge Gulch massacre | Hayfork Creek in Trinity County, Northern California | 70 American men led by Trinity County sheriff William H. Dixon killed more than 150 Wintu people in the Hayfork Valley of California, in retaliation for the killing of Col. John Anderson. | 150 | |
| 1853 | | Howonquet massacre | Smith River in Del Norte County, Northern California | Californian settlers attacked and burned the Tolowa village of Howonquet, massacring 70 people. | 70 | |
| 1853 | | Yontoket Massacre | Yontocket in Del Norte County, Northern California | A posse of settlers attacked and burned a Tolowa rancheria at Yontocket, California, killing 450 Tolowa during a prayer ceremony. | 450 | |
| 1853 | | Achulet Massacre | Lake Earl in Del Norte County, Northern California | White settlers launched an attack on a Tolowa village near Lake Earl in California, killing between 65 and 150 Indians at dawn. | 65–150 | |
| 1853 | Before December 31 | "Ox" incident | Visalia in Tulare County, Central Valley | U.S. forces attacked and killed an unreported number of Indians in the Four Creeks area (Tulare County, California) in what was referred to by officers as "our little difficulty" and "the chastisement they have received". | | |
| 1855 | January 22 | Klamath River massacres | Klamath River in Del Norte County, Northern California | In retaliation for the murder of six settlers and the theft of some cattle, whites commenced a "war of extermination against the Indians" in Humboldt County, California. | | |
| 1856 | March | Shingletown | Shingleton in Shasta County, Northern California | In reprisal for Indian stock theft, white settlers massacred at least 20 Yana men, women, and children near Shingletown, California. | 20 | |
| 1856–1859 | | Round Valley Settler Massacres | Round Valley in Mendocino County, Northern California | White settlers killed over a thousand Yuki Indians in Round Valley over the course of three years in an uncountable number of separate massacres. | 1,000+ | |
| 1859–1860 | | Mendocino War | Various sites in Mendocino County, Northern California | White settlers calling themselves the "Eel River Rangers", led by Walter Jarboe, killed at least 283 Indian men and countless women and children in 23 engagements over the course of six months. They were reimbursed by the U.S. government for their campaign. | 283+ | |
| 1859 | September | Pit River | Pit River in Northern California | White settlers massacred 70 Achomawi Indians (10 men and 60 women and children) in their village on the Pit River in California. | 70 | |
| 1859 | | Chico Creek | Big Chico Creek in Butte County, Northern California | White settlers attacked a Maidu camp near Chico Creek in California, killing indiscriminately 40 Indians. | 40 | |
| 1860 | Exact date unknown | Massacre at Bloody Rock | Mendocino National Forest in Mendocino County, Northern California | A group of 65 Yuki Indians were surrounded and massacred by white settlers at Bloody Rock, in Mendocino County, California. | 65 | |
| 1860 | February 26 | 1860 Wiyot massacre | Tuluwat Island in Humboldt County, Northern California | In three nearly simultaneous assaults on the Wiyot, at Indian Island, Eureka, Rio Dell, and near Hydesville, California, white settlers killed between 80 and 250 Wiyot in Humboldt County, California. Victims were mostly women, children, and elders, as reported by Bret Harte at Arcata newspaper. Other villages were massacred within two days. The main site is National Register of Historic Places in the United States #66000208. | 80–250 | |
| 1863 | April 19 | Keyesville massacre | Keyesville in Kern County, Central Valley | American militia and members of the California Volunteers cavalry killed 35 Tübatulabal men in Kern County, California. | 35 | |
| 1863 | August 28 | Konkow Trail of Tears | Chico in Butte County to Covelo in Mendocino County, Northern California | In August 1863 all Konkow Maidu were to be sent to the Bidwell Ranch in Chico and then be taken to the Round Valley Reservation at Covelo in Mendocino County. Any Indians remaining in the area were to be shot. Maidu were rounded up and marched under guard west out of the Sacramento Valley and through to the Coastal Range. 461 Native Americans started the trek, 277 finished. They reached the Round Valley on September 18, 1863. | 184 | |
| 1864 | | Oak Run massacre | Oak Run in Shasta County, Northern California | California settlers massacred 300 Yana Indians who had gathered near the head of Oak Run, California, for a spiritual ceremony. | 300 | |
| 1865 | | Owens Lake massacre | Owens Lake in Inyo County, Northern California | To avenge the killing of a woman and child at Haiwai Meadows, white vigilantes attacked a Paiute camp on Owens Lake in California, killing about 40 men, women, and children. | 40 | |
| 1865 | | Three Knolls massacre | Mill Creek in Tehama County, Northern California | White settlers massacred a Yana community at Three Knolls on the Mill Creek, California. | | |
| 1868 | | Campo Seco | Mill Creek in Tehama County, Northern California | A posse of white settlers massacred 33 Yahis in a cave north of Mill Creek, California. | 33 | |
| 1871 | | Kingsley Cave massacre | Ishi Wilderness in Tehama County, Northern California | Four settlers killed 30 Yahi Indians in Tehama County, California about two miles from Wild Horse Corral in the Ishi Wilderness. It is estimated that this massacre left only 15 members of the Yahi tribe alive. | 30 | |

=== Population decline ===
Estimated Native California population based on Handbook of the Indians of California (1925) (Cook 1978)

| Groups | Population by year All minimum sources below cite: | |
| Groups | 1770 | 1910 |
|---|---|---|
| Yurok | 2,500 (up to 3,100) | 700 |
| Karok | 1,500 (up to 2,000 to 2,700 ) | 800 |
| Wiyot | 1,000 | 100 |
| Tolowa | 1,000 | 150 |
| Hupa | 1,000 | 500 |
| Chilula, Whilkut | 1,000 | (*) |
| Mattole | 500 (up to 2,476) | (*) |
| Nongatl, Sinkyone, Lassik | 2,000 (up to 7,957) | 100 |
| Wailaki | 1,000 (up to 2,760) | 200 |
| Kato | 500 (up to 1,100) | (*) |
| Yuki | 2,000 (up to 6,000 to 20,000) | 100 |
| Huchnom | 500 | (*) |
| Coast Yuki | 500 | (*) |
| Wappo | 1,000 (up to 1,650) | (*) |
| Pomo | 8,000 (up to 10,000 to 18,000) | 1,200 |
| Lake Miwok | 500 | (*) |
| Coast Miwok | 1,500 | (*) |
| Shasta | 2,000 (up to 5,600 to 10,000) | 100 |
| Chimariko, New River, Konomihu, Oakwanuchu | 1,000 | (*) |
| Achomawi, Atsugawi | 3,000 | 1,100 |
| Modoc in California | 500 | (*) |
| Yana/Yahi | 1,500 | (*) |
| Wintun | 12,000 | 1,000 |
| Maidu | 9,000 (up to 9,500) | 1,100 |
| Miwok (Plains and Sierra) | 9,000 | 700 |
| Yokuts | 18,000 (up to 70,000) | 600 |
| Costanoan | 7,000 (up 10,000 to 26,000 combined with Salinan) | (*) |
| Esselen | 500 | (*) |
| Salinan | 3,000 | (*) |
| Chumash | 10,000 (up to 13,650 to 20,400) | (*) |
| Washo in California | 500 | 300 |
| Northern Paiute in California | 500 | 300 |
| Eastern and Western Mono | 4,000 | 1,500 |
| Tübatulabal | 1,000 | 150 |
| Koso, Chemehuevi, Kawaiisu | 1,500 | 500 |
| Serrano, Vanyume, Kitanemuk, Alliklik | 3,500 | 150 |
| Gabrielino, Fernandeño, San Nicoleño | 5,000 | (*) |
| Luiseño | 4,000 (up to 10,000) | 500 |
| Juaneño | 1,000 (up 3,340) | (*) |
| Cupeño | 500 (up to 750) | 150 |
| Cahuilla | 2,500 (up to 6,000 to 15,000) | 800 |
| Diegueño, Kamia | 3,000 (up to 6,000 to 19,000) | 800 |
| Mohave (total) | 3,000 | 1,050 |
| Halchidhoma (emigrated since 1800) | 1,000 (up to 2,500 (Note: Franciscan missionary-explorer Francisco Garcés)) | ........ |
| Yuma (Total) | 2,500 | 750 |
| Total of groups marked (*) | .......... | 450 |
| | | 15,850 |
| Less river Yumans in Arizona | 3,000 (up to 4,000) | 850 |
| Non-Californian Indians now in California | .......... | 350 |
| Affiliation doubtful or not reported | .......... | 1,000 |
| Total | 133,000 (up to 230,407 to 301,233) | 16,350 |

== Select ethnic groups targeted ==
While many groups were targeted in the genocide the circumstances of individual groups can be illustrative of the on the ground happenings of the killings.

=== Yuki ===
The Yuki people experienced catastrophe by the events of 1847–1853. The United States took possession of California from Mexico in January 1847, with the Gold Rush arriving swiftly in 1848. Hundreds of thousands came in the search of wealth, placing pressure on Indigenous Californians. More than 1,000 Yuki are estimated to have been killed in the Round Valley Settler Massacres of 1856–1859 and 400 in the Mendocino War; many others were enslaved and only 300 survived. The intent of the massacres was to exterminate the Yuki and gain control of the land they inhabited. U.S. Army soldiers deployed to the valley stopped further killings and in 1862 the California legislature revoked a law which permitted the kidnapping and enslavement of Native Americans in the state.

A few specific attacks of which there is witness testimony are:

- A local paper reported 55 Indians killed in Clinton Valley on October 8, 1856.
- A white farmer, John Lawson, admitted an attack killing eight Indians, three by shooting and five by hanging, after some of his hogs were stolen. He stated that these killings were a common practice.
- A white farmer, Isaac Shanon, testified to killing 14 Indians in a revenge attack after a white man was killed in early 1858.
- White persons from the Sacramento Valley came into Round Valley and killed four Yuki Indians with the help of locals in June 1858, despite having been warned against it by Indian Agents.
- White settlers attacked and killed nine Indians in the mountains edging the valley in November 1858.
- Former Superintendent of Indian Affairs, Thomas Henley (fired two months earlier for embezzling funds), led a massacre of 11 Yuki Indians in August 1859.

Due to the overwhelming number of killings, an exact death toll is unknowable. The following estimates were made by government agents and newspapers at the time:

- 1856: 300 total killed over the course of the year.
- Winter 1856–57: About 75 Yuki Indians killed over the course of the winter.
- March–April 1858: 300–400 male Yukis killed in three weeks.
- November 1858 – January 1859: 150+ or 170 Yuki Indians killed between November and January
- March–May 1859: 240 Yuki killed in assaults led by H.L. Hall in revenge for the slaughter of Judge Hastings's horse and a total of 600 men, women, and children killed within the previous year.

Yuki women and children were frequently kidnapped by raiders and sold to ranchos and landowners in California, particularly in Round Valley, where settler kidnapping rings operated. One example of this is provided by Round Valley Elder Ernestine Ray, who stated:

"They treated Grandma pretty bad . . . She had scars on her back. Mom, she used to cry . . . 'My poor mother she died with scars on her back. They beat her.'"

These estimates suggest well over 1,000 Yuki deaths at the hands of white settlers. (See Cook, Sherburne; "The California Indian and White Civilization" Part III, pg 7, for an argument in favor of the approximate reliability of figures of Indians killed at this time.)

=== Yahi ===
The Yahi were the first of the Yana people to suffer from the Californian Gold Rush, for their lands were the closest to the gold fields. Prior to the Gold Rush that began with the discovery of gold at Sutter's Mill in January 1848, the U.S. military had been involved in the destruction of California Natives which included the Yana people. The processes included removals of people from ancestral land, massacres, confinement to small reservations, and the separation of families. In California, miners, ranchers, farmers, and businessmen engaged in acts outlined in the Genocide Convention. They suffered great population losses from the loss of their traditional food supplies and fought with the settlers over territory. They lacked firearms, and armed white settlers intentionally committed genocide against them in multiple raids. These raids took place as part of the California genocide, during which the U.S. Army and vigilante militias carried out killings as well as the relocation of thousands of Indigenous peoples in California. The massacre reduced the Yahi, who were already suffering from starvation, to a population of less than 100.

On August 6, 1865, seventeen settlers raided a Yahi village at dawn. In 1866, more Yahis were massacred when they were caught by surprise in a ravine. Circa 1867, 33 Yahis were killed after being tracked to a cave north of Mill Creek. Circa 1871, four cowboys trapped and killed about 30 Yahis in Kingsley cave.

The last known survivor of the Yahi was named Ishi by American anthropologists. Ishi had spent most of his life hiding with his tribe members in the Sierra wilderness, emerging at the age of about 49, after the deaths of his mother and remaining relatives. He was the only Yahi known to Americans.

=== Tolowa ===
In 1770 the Tolowa had a population of 1,000; their population soon dropped to 150 in 1910; this was almost entirely due to deliberate mass murder in what has been described as genocide. Among these killings, the Yontoket Massacre left 150 to 600 Tolowa people recorded dead. Because their homes had burned down, the place received the name "Burnt Ranch." The Tolowa themselves date the first massacre at 1853, stating that between 450 and 600 people were killed. The second dated massacre at 1854 stating that about 150 people were killed. The Yontoket massacre decimated the cultural center of the Tolowa peoples. The Native people from the surrounding areas would gather there for their celebrations and discussions. The survivors of the massacre were forced to move to the village north of Smith's River called Howonquet. The slaughter of the Tolowa people continued for some years. They were seemingly always caught at their Needash celebrations. These massacres caused some unrest which led in part to the Rogue River Indian war. Many Tolowa people were incarcerated at Battery Point in 1855 to withhold them from joining an uprising led by their chief. In 1860, after the Chetco/Rogue River War, 600 Tolowa were forcibly relocated to Indian reservations in Oregon, including what is now known as the Siletz Reservation in the Central Coastal Range. Later, some were moved to the Hoopa Valley Reservation in California. Adding to the number of dead from the Yontoket Massacre and the Battery Point Attack, are many more in the following years. These massacres included the Chetco Massacre with 14 dead, the Illinois Creek massacre with 8 to 15 dead, the Howonquet Massacre with 70 dead, the Achulet massacre with 65 dead, (not including those whose bodies were left in the lake) and the Smith River Massacre(s) where hundreds may have been killed. Contemporary Tolowa recall the conditions of the Klamath Reservation as being reminiscent of a concentration camp. In 1857, desperate Tolowa organized an uprising in hopes of escaping these conditions, which led to 10-20 Tolowa being killed by the U.S. military when soldiers arrived to suppress the uprising.

=== Wiyot ===
Wiyot people were found primarily around Humboldt Bay at the time of their first encounters with settlers. The Wiyot were known to be friendly, and did not engage in conflict with settlers. Early incidents included: the murder of 2 Wiyot by white settlers in 1850, with further incidents soon following in the area.

Multiple massacres of Wiyot took place in 1852, along the Eel River, including one incident in which at least 15 Wiyot were killed. Massacres at Humboldt Bay in 1855, resulted in at least 15 killed, with the justification given that Indians "attempted violence upon a lady". Further massacres occurred in 1856 killing 6 Wiyot, and in 1859, a further 15.

The largest series of massacres came in 1860, when five separate massacres over the course of a week resulted in the deaths of over 285 Wiyot. Before the Indian Island massacre, Wiyot men had left the village to hunt. The volunteer company that arrived noted this absence, and upon encountering unarmed women and children, chose to conserve ammunition, and kill the Wiyot with axes and knives. Journalist Bret Harte, who reported and published a scathing article condemning the massacre, was forced to flee Humboldt, after receiving threats of lynching.

Following the massacres, some Wiyot were forcefully removed to the Klamath reservation. One survivor, Jane Sam, later recounted the starvation and destitution which was found on the reservation. Wiyot who were confined to reservations often returned to Humboldt Bay. In 1862, a further 28 to 46 Wiyot were massacred in two separate massacres at Light's Prairie and Little River.

== Economic aspects in Southern California ==
At the outset, the European-American population of Los Angeles County identified a practical application for the utilization of Indian labor within an economy that was experiencing a labor shortage due to the mass migration of working-age EuroAmericans to the gold fields. During the 1850s, white Americans in the Western United States depended on individuals of Amerindian descent to cultivate vast areas of land in return for minimal or non-existent monetary compensation. During the period of the Gold Rush, numerous rancho owners were able to reap significant benefits by driving their livestock into the Central Valley and Sierra foothills, thereby capitalizing on the relatively prosperous years of gold mining. Due to Economic expansion because of the increased need for mining, even Indigenous groups in remote locations, such as those in the Coso Range, were incorporated into the economy.

Forced labor, especially of children, was widespread in Southern California, and "Domesticated Indians" made up a significant portion of the early population of the region. These domestics were forcibly indentured labourers, often kidnapped and brought to towns like Los Angeles and San Francisco to work in households or as laborers.

The rise of forced labor severely impacted many tribes, particularly those in the south, they being heavily affected by the practice. In 1852, a third of Indigenous boys were indentured, and 65% of native women were bound out before the age of 15. Indigenous children were often brought to towns in southern California by kidnappers who would conduct raids in the north.

Indigenous girls who were held under indenture often experienced sexual abuse. Girls were frequently kidnapped directly from reservations and subject to extreme abuse. Indigenous women made up nearly half of all indentured. Indigenous people charged with vagrancy, or any other crimes, could also be summarily forced into indentured servitude. 3/4s of all indentured natives in California were under 14.

Over the course of the genocide, Native people in Southern California often lived in near-famine conditions, and had taxes imposed upon them. The Cupeno leader Antonio Garra organised people in San Diego County to revolt against these conditions, Garra's rebellion became one of the largest in Southern California, till his capture by Cahuilla leader Juan Antonio.

Epidemic disease and famine also decimated the Indigenous population of the state. Tribes in Southern California would suffer through epidemics of smallpox, and massacres. Tribes such as the Cahuilla, Gabrielino, and Yokut, frequently driven by starvation, would steal horses and livestock. Almost all "Mission Indians" in California were left landless over the course of the genocide, as their communities were forcibly dispersed, and lands taken by settlers.

== Legacy ==
=== Land grab and value ===
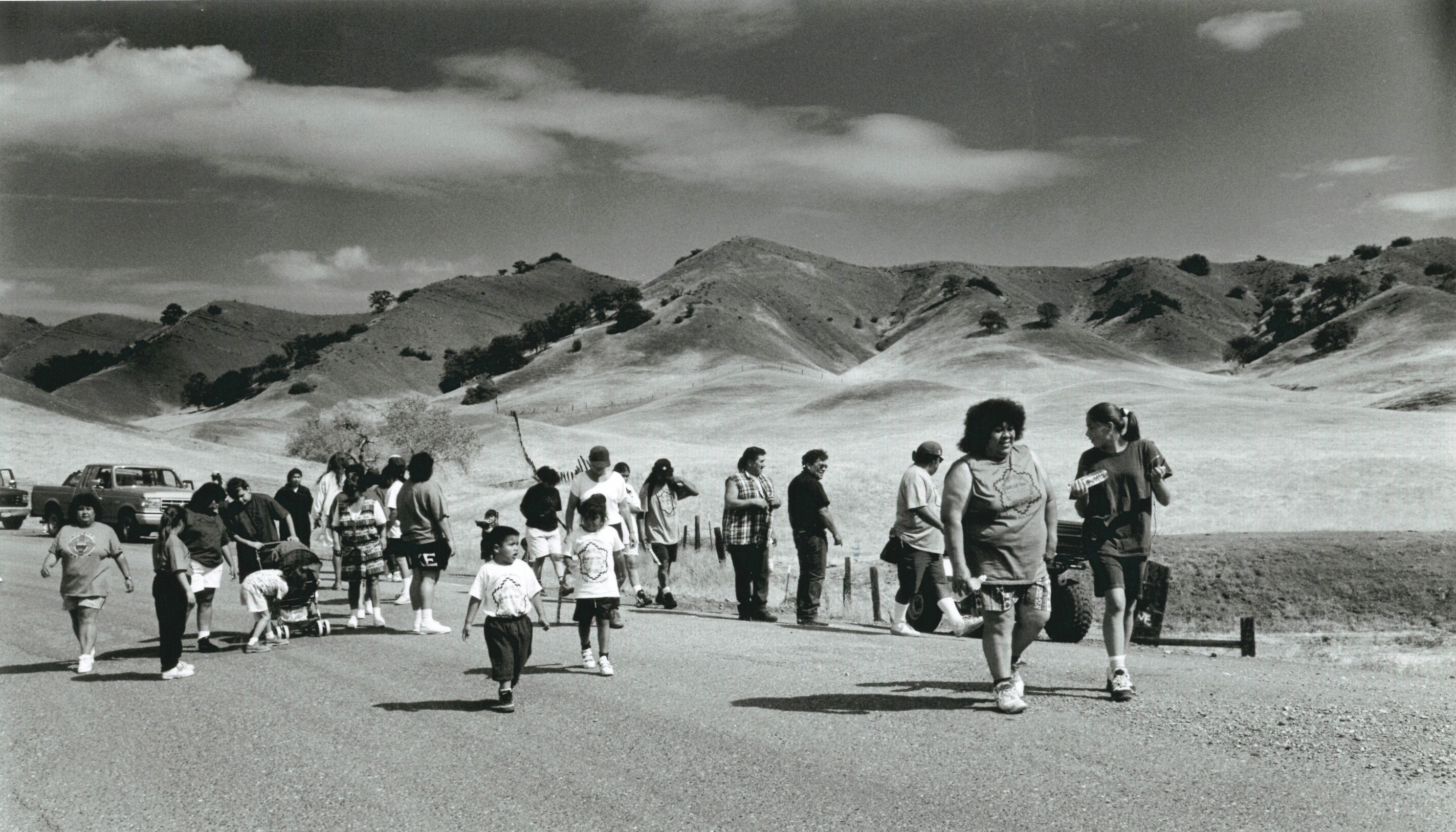
In 2013, members of the Round Valley Indian Tribes retraced the path of the 1863 forced relocation of Konkow Maidu people along the Nome Cult Trail.

According to M. Kat Anderson, an ecologist and lecturer at University of California, Davis, and Jon Keeley, a fire ecologist and research scientist with the U.S. Geological Survey, after decades of being disconnected from the land and their culture, due to Spanish and U.S. settler violence, Native peoples are slowly starting to be able to practice traditions that enhance the environment around them, by directly taking care of the land. Anderson and Keeley write, "The outcomes that Indigenous people were aiming for when burning chaparral, such as increased water flow, enhanced wildlife habitat, and the maintenance of many kinds of flowering plants and animals, are congruent and dovetail with the values that public land agencies, non-profit organizations, and private landowners wish to preserve and enhance through wildland management". Through these returned practices, they are able to commit and practice their culture, while also helping the other people in the area that will benefit from the ecological differences.

California Landmark 427, built in 2005 represents the Bloody Island Massacre of the Pomo people that took place on May 15, 1850. The monument is used as a center point of an annual festival beginning in 1999 held by Pomo descendants. Candles and tobacco are burned in honor of their ancestors.

=== Call for tribunals ===
American Indian scholar Gerald Vizenor has argued in the early 21st century for universities to be authorized to assemble tribunals to investigate these events. He notes that United States federal law contains no statute of limitations on war crimes and crimes against humanity, including genocide. He says:

Genocide tribunals would provide venues of judicial reason and equity that reveal continental ethnic cleansing, mass murder, torture, and religious persecution, past and present, and would justly expose, in the context of legal competition for evidence, the inciters, falsifiers, and deniers of genocide and state crimes against Native American Indians. Genocide tribunals would surely enhance the moot court programs in law schools and provide more serious consideration of human rights and international criminal cases by substantive testimony, motivated historical depositions, documentary evidence, contentious narratives, and ethical accountability.

Vizenor believes that, in accordance with international law, the universities of South Dakota, Minnesota, and California Berkeley ought to establish tribunals to hear evidence and adjudicate crimes against humanity alleged to have taken place in their individual states. Attorney Lindsay Glauner has also argued for such tribunals.

=== Apologies and name changes ===
In a speech before representatives of Native American peoples in June 2019, California governor Gavin Newsom apologized for the genocide. Newsom referring to the proposed California Truth and Healing Council said, "California must reckon with our dark history. California Native American peoples suffered violence, discrimination and exploitation sanctioned by state government throughout its history .... It's called genocide. That's what it was, a genocide. No other way to describe it. And that's the way it needs to be described in the history books. We can never undo the wrongs inflicted on the peoples who have lived on this land that we now call California since time immemorial, but we can work together to build bridges, tell the truth about our past and begin to heal deep wounds." After hearing testimony, a Truth and Healing Council will clarify the historical record on the relationship between the state of California and American Indians.

In November 2021, the board of directors of the former "University of California Hastings College of Law" voted to change the name of the institution because of its founder and namesake S. C. Hastings's alleged involvement in the killing and dispossessing of Yuki people in the 1850s. The name change was approved via an act of the California Legislature (California Assembly Bill 1936, 2021–2022 regular session) and was signed into law by the governor on 23 September 2022. The name change took effect on January 1, 2023. The institution is now known as the University of California College of the Law, San Francisco.

In April 2024, Governor Newsom announced California's support for returning ancestral tribal lands to Indigenous communities, describing the initiative as "an acknowledgment of past sins, a promise of accountability, and a commitment to a better future". The California Truth and Healing Council, established pursuant to Newsom's 2019 executive order, was charged with examining the historical relationship between the state and Native Americans, with authority to make recommendations on reparation and restoration measures.

=== Archaeological evidence of violence and refugeeism in California ===
Research made in 2015 on Native burial mounds in the San Francisco Bay Area found that Indigenous people would move to different places in order to avoid genocide. The movement can be traced by the dating of the burial mounds since multiple Native tribes found these burial mound spaces as places of religious and cultural freedom.

The Amah Mutsun are a group of Indigenous peoples who were reported to be unable to pass on their traditions during this time, their practices remained untold for a number of years. People of this group, descendants, and archaeologists participate in conducting collaborative, ethnographic research to bring light to previous practices like burial practices and vegetation patterns.

== Academic debate on the term "genocide" ==
There is vigorous debate over the scale of American Indian losses after the discovery of gold in California and whether to characterize them as genocide. The application of the term "genocide", in particular, has been controversial. According to historian Jeffrey Ostler, the debate mostly rests on disagreements regarding the definition of the term. He writes that by a strict ("intentionalist") definition, genocide "requir[es] a federal or state government intention to kill all California Indians and an outcome in which the majority of deaths were from direct killing", while by a less strict ("structuralist") definition, it "requir[es] only settler intention to destroy a substantial portion of California Indians using a variety of means ranging from dispossession to systematic killing". Under the former definition, Ostler argues that "genocide does not seem applicable," whereas under the latter definition, "genocide seems apt."

In 1948, Article 2 of the UN Convention on the Prevention and Punishment of the Crime of Genocide defined genocide as

... any of the following acts committed with intent to destroy, in whole or in part, a national, ethnic, racial or religious group, as such:

(a) Killing members of the group;
(b) Causing serious bodily or mental harm to members of the group;
(c) Deliberately inflicting on the group conditions of life calculated to bring about its physical destruction in whole or in part;
(d) Imposing measures intended to prevent births within the group;
(e) Forcibly transferring children of the group to another group.

— Convention on the Prevention and Punishment of the Crime of Genocide, Article 2

=== For use of the term ===
Historians who argue the term "genocide" is appropriate point out that the Indian population of California fell quickly and argue that extreme violence was integral to this process. Benjamin Madley, a UCLA historian, is one of the most prominent historians espousing this view, writing that "[i]t was genocide, sanctioned and facilitated by California officials" who, according to him, "established a state-sponsored killing machine". Historian Brendan C. Lindsay, argued that "rather than a government orchestrating a population to bring about the genocide of a group, [in California] the population orchestrated a government to destroy a group", while William T. Hagen wrote that "[genocide] is a term of awful significance, but one which has application to the story of California's Native Americans". James J. Rawls argued that Californian whites "advocated and carried out a program of genocide that was popularly called 'extermination'". Militias were called out by the governors of California for "expeditions against the Indians" on a number of occasions.

Supporters of the use of the term "genocide" stress the involvement and complicity of federal and state authorities in perpetrating atrocities against the Indigenous Californians, and point to their statements and policies as evidence of direct genocidal intent. For example, historian Richard White, in a review of Madley's An American Genocide, argues that "no reader of his book can seriously contend that what happened in California doesn't meet the current definition of "genocide"," citing the "relentless attacks by federal troops, state militia, vigilantes, and mercenaries [that] made the enslavement of Indians possible and starvation and disease inevitable". White continues, "in California, what Americans have often called "war" was nothing of the sort. For every American who died, 100 Indians perished. They died horribly—men, women, and children. The men who killed them were brutal. Nor did the killings result from a moment of rage; they were systematic." White stresses the complicity of the US federal government, noting that "the funding that the US government provided for California's militia expeditions made attacking Indians possible and profitable". Writing about the experience of Indigenous Californian women during this period, Women's studies scholar Gail Ukockis argues that "government officials were quite explicit about their genocidal intent," citing the 1851 State of the State address given by the 1st Governor of California, Peter Burnett, in which he said: "That a war of extermination will continue to be waged between the races until the Indian race becomes extinct must be expected."

Jeffrey Ostler, too, endorsed the usage of the term, writing that it "rests on a substantial body of scholarship". Ostler argues that there is a "general consensus" that genocide took place in at least "some times and places in the state's early history". Responding to critics of the "genocide" charge that have argued that epidemics were the primary cause of Native mortality, Ostler writes that "depopulation from disease more often resulted from conditions created by colonialism—in California, loss of land, destruction of resources and food stores, lack of clean water, captive taking, sexual violence, and massacre—that encouraged the spread of pathogens and increased communities' vulnerability through malnutrition, exposure, social stress, and destruction of sources of medicine and capacities for palliative care". He continues, "since the United States' colonization of California was intended to dispossess Indigenous peoples and since that intention had the predictable consequence of making communities vulnerable to multiple diseases which led to massive population loss, disease in this case qualifies as a crucial factor contributing to genocide".

Karl Jacoby, in his review of An American Genocide, argues that the book removes "any doubt that genocide against Native people took place in the most populous and prosperous state in the US" and that it establishes "conclusively the reality of genocide in the Golden State". He also notes that Madley "illuminates the ways that federal and state policies facilitated popular violence against Indians". William Bauer Jr. argues that Benjamin Madley "has settled the issue on whether or not genocide occurred in California". He writes also that "federal and state governments, those bodies that could or should have protected California Indians from the devastating violence, condoned and perpetrated genocides" and that "civilian leaders in California passed legislation that enabled genocide". Margaret Jacobs writes that Madley has made it "nearly impossible to deny that a genocide took place against Native peoples in at least one location and one time period in American history" and that he shows how "the genocide started out as the work of vigilante groups but soon gained state funding and federal support". Jacobs points out, for example, that "in 1854, Congress agreed to pay off California's war debt, and by the end of 1856, the federal government had given California more than $800,000 to distribute to bond holders who had financed the genocidal killing in the state."

In his book The Rediscovery of America, historian Ned Blackhawk argues that "historians have located genocide across Native American history" and cites California as a specific example. Blackhawk writes that in California, "settlers used informal and state-sanctioned violence to shatter Native worlds and legitimate their own" and also notes that "in February 1852, for example, the state legislature appropriated $500,000 to fund anti-Indian state militias". Regarding the role of the federal government, he writes that they had "earlier attempted an alternate scenario to the genocide at hand. In 1851 and 1852, officials negotiated eighteen treaties across the state; however, bowing to California representatives, the Senate rejected these treaties, essentially authorizing the continued use of settler violence to aid colonization."

William S. Kiser also concurs that genocide took place in California, writing that "state-sponsored scalp warfare rose to the level of genocide", noting that "well-organized participants acted systematically and relentlessly in their attempts to exterminate racial groups."

=== Against the use of the term ===
Other scholars and historians dispute the accuracy of the term "genocide" to describe what occurred in California, as well as the blame which has been placed directly on the federal government and the state government of California, pointing to the fact that disease was the primary factor in the depopulation of California Indians and arguing that mass violence was undertaken primarily by settlers and that the state and federal governments did not establish a policy of physically killing all Indians. One of the most prominent historians espousing such a view is Gary Clayton Anderson, a University of Oklahoma professor of history who describes the events in California as "ethnic cleansing", arguing that "If we get to the point where the mass murder of 50 Indians in California is considered genocide, then genocide has no more meaning". Historian William Henry Hutchinson, wrote that "the record of history disproves these charges [of genocide]", while historian Tom Henry Watkins stated that "it is a poor use of the term" since the killings were not systematic or planned.

In a critical review of Brendan Lindsay's Murder State: California's Native American Genocide, 1846–1873, Michael F. Magliari notes that "[Sherburne] Cook never described the terrible events of 1846–1873 as a genocide, and neither had any of his leading successors in California Indian history". While acknowledging that actions against some tribes native to California were genocidal, he opts for the term ethnocidal for actions against other tribes, considering the former term's application to all cases "highly problematic". (He rejects the UN Genocide Convention's "sweeping definition" of genocide, whereas Lindsay embraces it.) In a subsequent review of Benjamin Madley's An American Genocide, he says that some scholars may find Madley's use of the UN Genocide Convention as an "overly broad and elastic definition", that the evidence of genocide "varies considerably from place to place and is far stronger in some cases", and that Madley's case against the federal government is "not nearly so strong" as that against "frontier miners, farmers, and ranchers". Magliari also argues that "epidemics, not violence, still remained by far the greater factor in Native mortality". He nevertheless concludes : "Beyond the shadow of any reasonable doubt (and by the standards of any reasonable definition), genocide did in fact play a significant role in the US conquest and subjugation of Native California."

== See also ==
- Bibliography of California history
- List of genocides committed by the United States
- American Indian Wars
- California Indian Reservations and Cessions
- California Indian Wars
- California mission clash of cultures
- Comanche campaign
- Cupeño trail of tears
- Genocides in history
- Genocide of Indigenous peoples
- History of California
- List of genocides
- List of Indian massacres
- Long Walk of the Navajo
- Northern Cheyenne Exodus
- Serranus Clinton Hastings
- Trail of Tears
- Yavapai Wars
- Peter Hardeman Burnett
- George S. Evans
- Genocide definitions
- Genocide Convention
- Outline of genocide studies
