= An American Genocide =

2017 non-fiction book by Benjamin Madley

- Author: Benjamin Madley
- Subject: California genocide
- Genre: History
- Publisher: Yale University Press
- Publication date: 27 June 2017
- Media type: Print (hardback and paperback)
- Pages: 712
- ISBN: 978-0300230697

An American Genocide: The United States and the California Indian Catastrophe, 1846-1873 is a 2017 non-fiction book about the California genocide written by University of California, Los Angeles professor Benjamin Madley.

== Background and publication ==
An American Genocide was the first book to fully document the U.S. government-sanctioned California genocide. The book was published by Yale University Press and is used by Yale University.

== Synopsis ==
The chronologically arranged book documents the U.S. federal government's role in the 19th-century California genocide. The book details killing of Native Americans by the European Americans who violently colonised California. It documents the pre-1846 history of the state, when Spanish colonisers used Native Americans as a source of low-cost labour, and how Native Americans suffered from both disease and land theft. When the Americans arrived, they started a program of genocidal extermination, killing 80% of the Native American population, who lacked access to firearms. The book documents the enslavement of Native American women by Americans and the abuse of children:

“[Some] white men came. They killed my grandfather and my mother and my father. . . . Then they killed my baby sister and cut her heart out and threw it in the brush where I ran and hid.”

The book's author names the actions as genocidal and devotes 200 pages of the book to documenting almost every killing that took place during the time period that the book covers.

== Critical reception ==
The book won the Los Angeles Times Book Award for History in 2016 and was a New York Times Book Review Editors’ Choice.

In 2018, the Pacific Historical Review described the book as "monumental." The Journal of the Early Republic described it as "impressive" and praised the author for the quality of his research.
