= Act for the Government and Protection of Indians =

California statute

California State Legislature
- Full name: Act for the Government and Protection of Indians
- Assembly voted: April 19, 1850
- Signed into law: April 22, 1850
- Sponsor(s): Chamberlin, Bidwell
- Code: California Statutes, 1850
- Section: Chapter 133

Status: Repealed

The first Constitution of California, ratified in November of 1849, denied Native Americans the right to vote. Less than six months later, the first session of the California State Legislature enacted the Act for the Government and Protection of Indians (Chapter 133, Cal. Stats., April 22, 1850), nicknamed the Indian Indenture Act. It was signed into law by the first Governor of California, Peter Hardeman Burnett.

This legislation regulated employment terms, redefined criminal activity and punishment, and led to the forced labor of many Native Americans in California. It played a crucial role in enabling the California genocide, in which thousands of Native Californians were killed or enslaved by white settlers during the California gold rush.

Burnett stated in 1851 that the fact "[t]hat a war of extermination will continue to be waged between the races until the Indian race becomes extinct must be expected". The act facilitated the removal and displacement of Native Californians from their traditional lands, separating at least a generation of children and adults from their families, languages, and cultures from 1850 to 1865.

Although it required a relative's consent to adopt a Native child, in practice the Act contained a loophole which allowed white frontier settlers to adopt seemingly orphaned Native children. Armed militias rapidly began attacking isolated villages, murdering parents, abducting their children, and selling them into child slavery. In 1862, the Alta California daily newspaper reported that these militias sold children for as high as $150 "depending on their quality."

Due to the nature of California court records, it is difficult to estimate of the number of Native Americans enslaved as a result of the legislation. During the time period between 1850 and 1870 in which the legislation was in effect, the Native Californian population of Los Angeles decreased from 3,693 to 219 people. Although the California legislature repealed parts of the statute after the Thirteenth Amendment to the United States Constitution abolished involuntary servitude in 1865, it was not repealed in its entirety until 1937. In 2019, Governor Gavin Newsom apologized on behalf of the state of California for the legislation.

== Background ==
=== California gold rush ===
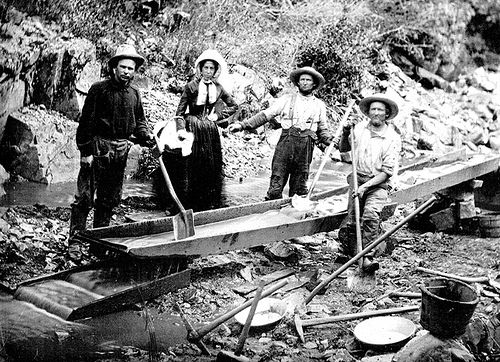
Men and women in the 1850 California gold rush

Prior to 1846, the non-native population of California was limited to less than 15,000 people. However, as a result of the California gold rush, this population rose to 100,000 people by 1849. Tensions built between Anglo-American miners and Native Californians in the area. Early on in the gold rush, miners banded together in what were essentially militia groups, contributing to harassment and murder of Indigenous peoples in the area. This led to many instances of massacre, with groups of natives becoming smaller in size and weaker in their ability to fight back. They were already battling disease and lack of food.

Some communities during the California gold rush offered bounties for Indian heads or scalps. Hence, Indian raiders could bring the evidence of their kill in, and receive direct local compensation, leading to sanctioned genocide in the area and setting a precedent of horrific violence against Native Americans in California.

Beginning in July 1846, The United States occupied California. In an effort to mediate conflict, General Stephen Kearny, governor of California, appointed John Sutter and Mariano Vallejo to offices as subagents for the Indians, near Sacramento and San Francisco, respectively, in April 1847 to secure information pertaining to Native Californians in their respective areas, establish local regulations, and considered themselves protectors of those Indigenous to the area. However, the interactions that took place were not protective and not peaceful. As a result, Lieutenant William Tecumseh Sherman authorized any person to shoot those Native to the area, if caught stealing a horse. Natives that were employed were required to have certification on them beginning November 1, 1847, and those caught without these certificates were to be considered horse-thieves, and arrested and punished as such. At the same time, the United States ruled that Native Americans in the area did not have the right to sell or lease the lands on which they resided.

Thomas Butler King was appointed to analyze conditions in California, particularly pertaining to Indigenous relations, by the President in 1849. "Indian agents" and "subagents" were as by the commissioner of Indian affairs in various areas, appointed to study land titles and further understand Indigenous relations. Thomas Butler King's report misrepresented the Native Californians in the area, conveying that those Indigenous to the land were of the lowest grade of being, and held little inclination to work or improve their status. King made the assumption that they could benefit from teachings of arts of civilization. Adam Johnston had a similar report, concluding that Indigenous groups were in a low stage of development, and were being pushed out of their homes by migrants. These reports most likely held influence over the policies that came to follow, enforcing the concentration and distribution of resources by the federal government.

=== First California Constitution ===
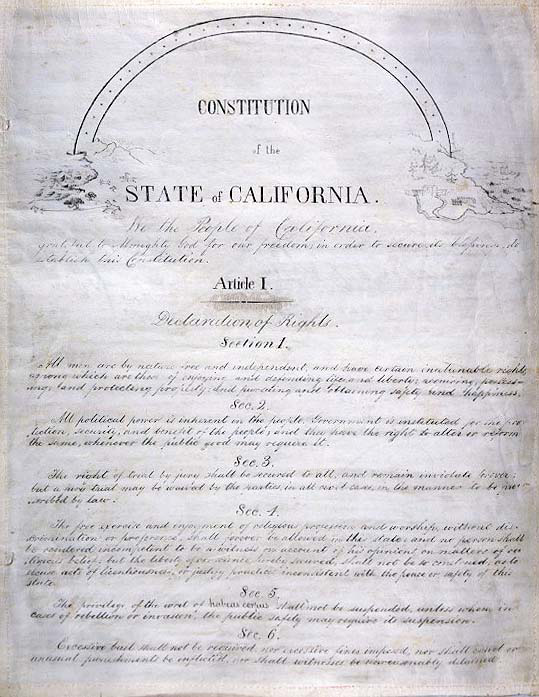
The California Constitution, circa 1849

In 1849, the first constitution of California was created by the delegates of the California Constitutional Convention. There was debate over whether those considered native to California should have the right to vote. A minority cited the Declaration of Independence and taxation without representation as reason to allow it, though ultimately the majority won, and those considered native to the area of California were not allowed to vote.

On April 22, 1850, the first California Legislature passed An Act for the Government and Protection of Indians, initially introduced as An Act relative to the protection, punishment, and government of Indians by Senator Chamberlin.

== Provisions of the Act ==
The Act did provide some protections to Native Americans. It prevented them from being "forced to abandon their homes or villages where they have resided for a number of years," and required people adopting Native children to get the consent of their relatives, clothe them, "suitably feed" them, and treat them humanely. It required employment contracts between white men and Native workers to be in writing and approved by a judge. And it prevented Native Americans from being kidnapped and enslaved without the intervention of the justice system.

However, it also protected white people from being "convicted of any offence upon the testimony of an Indian." Which required any Native American accusing a white person of these, or other offenses, to find another white person willing to testify on their behalf. On April 16, the 1850 Act specifically banned Native Americans with 1/2 Indian blood from providing testimonial confirmation against white settlers in criminal cases. A couple days later, Native Americans were prohibited from serving as jurors. Furthermore, on February 19, 1851, the law restricted Indians with 1/4 Indian blood from serving as witnesses in cases including white settlers based on unsubstantiated claims that Native Americans were "mentally unstable".

Its impact upon low-income and poor Native people was the harshest. It allowed any white person to post a bond for any fine charged to a Native American in court, and enslave them for an amount of time chosen by the Court to pay it off. White people were also allowed to have them arrested for crimes as minor as "strolling about" and "leading an immoral or profligate course of life," and then effectively sold to the highest bidder for up to four months if they could not post bail.

=== Amendments ===
The Act was amended in 1860 to effectively codify the Spanish practice of forcing California Indians into slavery. Under the amendment of Section 3, settlers could indenture Native children in their care for employment or training, continuing into adulthood. Boys below the age of fourteen could be forced to work until they turned twenty-five; girls, until they turned twenty-one. Teenagers aged fourteen through nineteen could be forcibly indentured until the age of thirty for boys, and twenty-five for girls. Forcing minors into employment or trade apprenticeship no longer required a parent or friend to consent.

It further allowed them to effectively enslave Native Americans aged twenty or older who had "no settled habitation or means of livelihood, and have not placed themselves under the protection of any white person," for up to ten years at the discretion of a judge. Beginning in November 1847, Native Americans were required to carry a certificate of employment on them at all times; being caught without it could be considered proof of vagrancy sufficient for enslavement.

The only requirement for what the law called "indenture of apprenticeship" was that the settler take over their "care, custody, control" - and earnings.

Section 7 was amended subjecting any person indenturing a Native American, except as provided in the Act, to prosecution and fines. In 1872, section 6 was repealed. In 1872, the California Constitution was amended, granting Native Americans the right to testify in courts of law.

== Implementation ==
This act allowed for any Native American that was strolling about to be declared vagrant by a white person and taken before a justice, to be subsequently sold at public auction, and was very much exploited in the overuse of this allowance by white Americans. At the time, it was common for ranchers and land owners to pay their workers, many of whom were Native Americans, in alcohol. Thus, public intoxication was almost encouraged, leading to frequent arrests and ensuing enslavement. After a few months of employment, it was common for enslaved Native Americans to be returned to the streets, typically in an area with alcohol in order to be declared a vagrant once again and be returned to labor. Workers were forced to work until their debt was paid, and these citizens did not have the right to vote or testify in court. One example of this is demonstrated when a white individual named Edward Simmons was atrociously murdered in Santa Barbara. The authorities expeditiously captured and arrested a Native American man due their baseless assumption of the man being strongly suspicious. On another note, these auctions occurred in the streets of present-day Los Angeles, acting as a flourishing slave market from 1850 to 1870. Many men made livings off of these auctions, with young Native Californians being sold anywhere from $30 to $150.

In the years of 1851 and 1852, the California Legislature financially incentivized harassment of Natives, authorizing pay of $1,100,000 for the "suppression of Indian hostilities." These bonds were continued in the year 1857 in the amount of $410,000. In April 1863, after the Emancipation Proclamation, the indenture and "apprecenticeship" of Native Americans was abolished by the California Legislature. The law was repealed in 1866, after the 14th Amendment was added to the United States Constitution. This stated that no state should infringe on any citizen's privileges or immunities, nor deprive any person of life, liberty, or property without due process of law, nor deny any one person the equal protection of the law. Lingering slave trafficking faded out in the 1870s, largely due to the decreasing population of Native Americans in the area as well as the increase in immigrants from other nations, namely China and European countries.

=== Treaties and negotiations ===
In 1851, a process of treaty writing began following the appointment of three commissioners by the federal government, with 18 treaties negotiated with various tribes in the California region by 1852. Cumulatively, these treaties set aside almost 7.5 million acres of land, close to one third of the land in California, specifically for Native use. These treaties also consisted of substantial nourishment, providing money for meals and resources in a hope to have the tribes be self-sufficient. Almost immediately, these treaties were opposed in the State Senate, and ordered to be opposed in ratification, calling for the removal of Indians due to the dislike of assigning large portions of promising agricultural land to those Native to the land. The United States government failed to ratify these treaties.

In 1852, the first Superintendent of Indian Affairs in California, Edward F. Beale, was appointed, with a plan to establish at least five reserves. $250,000 was appropriated by Congress, and the Tejon Reserve was established in September 1853. Around 2,000 Natives were brought to the 50,000-acre land (20,000 ha). In focusing on these efforts, Beale neglected many other vulnerable Native Californians. In 1854, he was removed from his position.

His replacement in 1854, Col. Thomas J. Henley, established the Nome Lacklee Reservation; Nome Cult, Mendocino; Fresno Indian Farm; and Kings River Indian Farm. These reservations suffered from crop damage and a lack of water, resulting in poor living conditions. Eventually, federal ownership was relinquished and once again those native to the land were forced to move. In 1870, oversight of the reserves was turned over to the Quaker Church, in addition to the Methodists, Baptists, and other churches, which were generally intolerant of Native American's traditional beliefs. Turning reservations into missions began the first tool in California-Native American relations used in attempt to assimilated Natives into the general population.

== Concurrent legislation ==
The Act for the Government and Protection of Indians is in line with other laws passed in the state of California during this time, such as the Greaser Act in 1855 and the Foreign Miners' Tax Act of 1850 (repealed in 1851 and reinstated in 1852).

== Impact ==
This act had devastating impacts on the population of those native to the area of California. Under the 1850 Act for the Government and Protection of Indians, there were many policies that supported the forced relocation of Native Americans. For example, the Maidu people were forced to cross the Sacramento River, which resulted in many of the Maidu people drowning, including infants and young children. Prior to the Gold Rush, it is estimated that there were between 100,000 and 125,000 Native Californians living in the state. The location of these instances of violence and disregard of human rights have become significant in present-day movements. Native groups have since used this auction location as a common protest site, emphasizing the location's history of injustice. There were lasting effects of the tenets of the act itself, and many lingered far past the original repeal of the law. Those Native to California were not allowed the right to vote, even after the 15th Amendment of the United States was ratified, affirming the right of all US citizens to vote. Native Californians were not granted the right to vote until the federal Indian Citizenship Act was passed in 1924.

== See also ==
- California genocide
- Convict leasing
- Forced labor in California
