= William Thomas Hagan =

American professor (1918–2011)

William Thomas Hagan (December 19, 1918 – August 5, 2011) was a history professor at the University of Oklahoma and an author. He was born in Huntington, West Virginia. He served in World War II. He studied at Marshall College (now Marshall University) and the University of Wisconsin. He taught at the University of North Texas in Denton, in the SUNY system, and then joined the University of Oklahoma faculty where he was a professor emeritus. He was married to Charlotte "April" Hagan with whom he had four children.

== Work ==
- The Sac and Fox Indians (1958)
- American Indians (1961)
- Indian Police and Judges (1966)
- United States-Comanche Relations (1976)
- The Indian Rights Association : the Herbert Welsh years, 1882–1904 (1985)
- Quanah Parker, Comanche Chief (1995) *Theodore Roosevelt and Six Friends of the Indians (1997)
- Taking Indian Lands: The Cherokee (Jerome) Commission, 1889–1893 (2003), *Charles Goodnight: Father of the Texas Panhandle (2007)
