= Nome Cult Trail =

Forced removal of Californian Concow Maidu people (1860s)

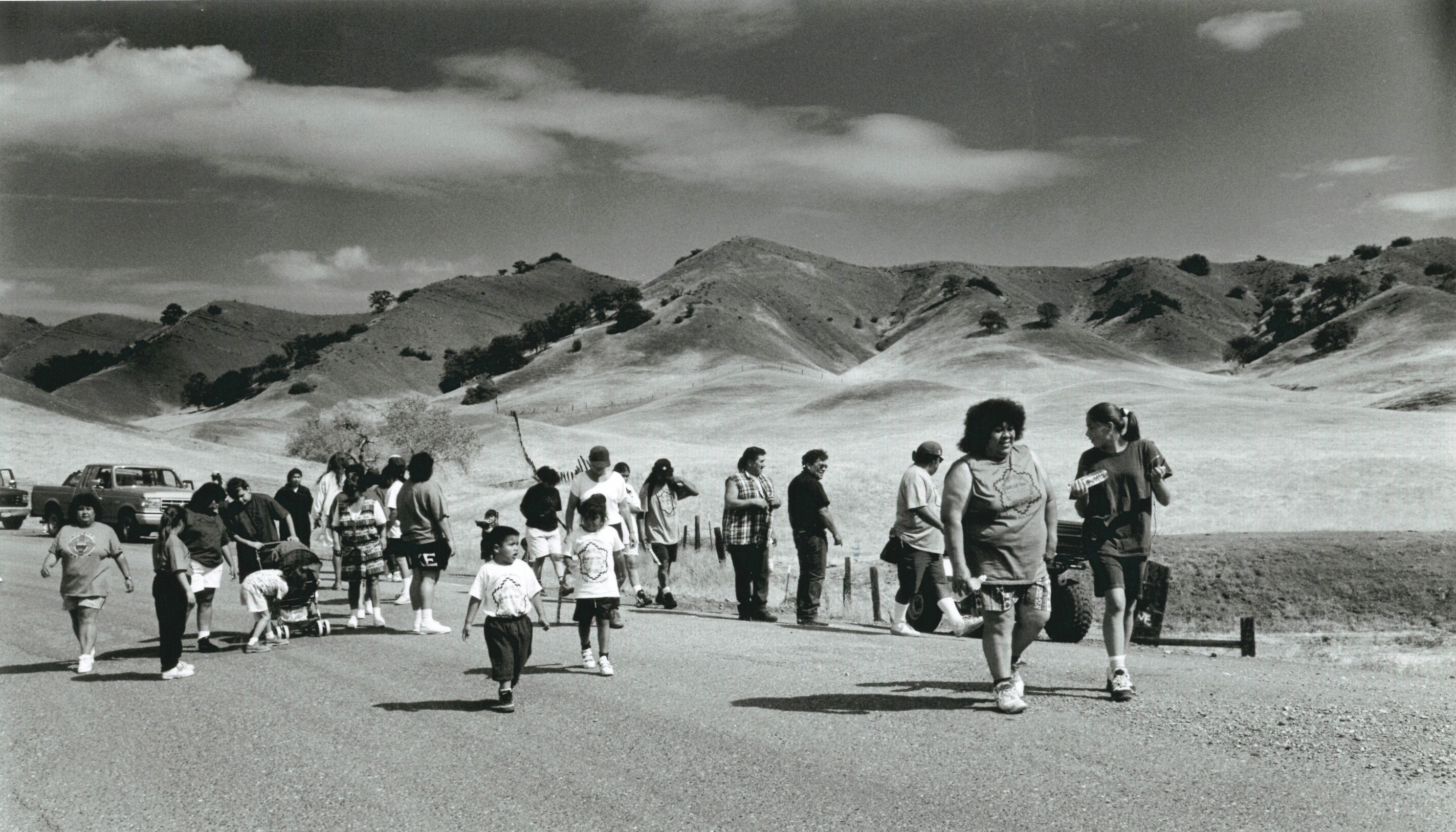
Members of the Round Valley Indian Tribe retrace the 1863 route of the Nome Cult walk, a forced relocation of Indians from Chico to Covelo.” – U.S. Forest Service

The Nome Cult Trail also known as the Concow (or Koncow) Trail of Tears refers to the state-sanctioned forced removal of the Northern Californian Concow Maidu people during the 1860s to Round Valley Reservation. This historic trail is located in present-day Mendocino National Forest which follows Round Valley Road, through Rocky Ridge and the Sacramento Valley. On August 28, 1863, the Konkow Maidu were ordered by the California state militia to report to Camp Bidwell near Chico to be removed to the Round Valley Reservation at Covelo in Mendocino County. Any Native Americans remaining in the area were to be shot. 461 Concow Maidu were forced to march under guard west out of the Sacramento Valley and through to the Coastal Range. Only 277 reached Round Valley reservation on September 18, 1863, as 150 were too ill and malnourished to finish the march, 32 died en route, and 2 escaped.

Today, there are close to 2,000 Maidu people who currently belong to the Federally Recognized Native Tribes of Berry Creek, Enterprise, and Mooretown Rancherias in Northern California. The Maidu people continue to make contributions to their Nation, their communities, and the world, especially through establishing strong administrative and financial systems at the rancherias aiming to improve tribal health. The current residents of the Round Valley Reservation host an annual walk on the Nome Cult Trail to commemorate the 1863 Removal of their Concow Maidu ancestors.

== History ==
Four hundred sixty-one members of the Concow Maidu were rounded up and, on 4 September 1863, were forced to march more than 100 miles (160 km) from Chico, California to the Round Valley Indian Reservation, escorted by twenty-three U.S. cavalrymen under the command of Captain Augustus Starr.

=== Historical context and California State Legislature ===
The California Gold Rush of 1849 led to an influx of miners and ranchers who settled in the Sierra Nevada and Northern California goldfield regions. The mining of gold disrupted indigenous California communities through the degradation of the environment on which they depended, violent attacks on Native California villages by white settlers, and the implementation of a state-sanctioned system of unfree labor.

In 1850, the California Legislature passed the Act for the Government and Protection of the Indians which established vagrancy clauses for Native Californians. Under these vagrancy clauses, Native Americans were hired out to white ranchers and farmers in a system of coerced labor. The Act also allowed white settlers to post bail for Native Californians accused of misdemeanors and compel them to work to pay off their bond. The law also permitted white settlers to hold Indigenous children as indentured servants with parental consent.

The establishment of a state-sanctioned bounty system in 1851–1852 in Northern California further perpetuated violence against Indigenous communities. By 1856, the governor issued a bounty of $0.25 per Native American scalp which was included to $5.00 by 1860. Bounty hunters were reimbursed for the ammunition and other supplies required to murder and scalp Native Northern Californians in addition to collecting the bounty award for the scalps. Citizen of the Round Valley Reservation and historian William Bauer states in his book We Were All Like Migrant Workers Here, “[a]t its worst, this law created a system of Indian slavery in California.”

=== Establishment of the Nome Cult Farm ===
In June 1856, under the orders of Simmon Storms, an immigrant rancher and worker at the Nome Lackee Reservation near modern-day Red Bluff, and Weimer, a Grass Valley Nisenan leader, traveled from the Nome Lackee Reservation to Red Valley, California. Storms named Round Valley “Nome Cult” as a mispronunciation of the Nomlaki phrase nome kechl meaning “western tribe” or “western language.” Storms and his party established the Nome Cult Farm in the homeland of the Yuki Native Californians.

Storms’ report to Thomas J. Henley, California's Superintendent of Indian Affairs describes his impressions Round Valley and his intention to establish a reservation in the area:

On the 14th we got an early start and arrived at the Valley a little after sun rise – this day as well as the 15th, 16th, & 17th we spent in exploring the Valley, and getting all the Information I could in regard to the Indians, their Numbers, habits, xxxx &c. On the first day of my arrival I was satisfied in my own Mind, that of all the places I have ever seen, this was the place for an Indian Reservation. And accordingly I laid claim to the Valley in the name of the Government for that purpose. In the afternoon I called my party around me and christened it ‘Nome Cult’ Valley.

The Yuki, Nisenan, and Atsugewis performed the manual labor necessary to provision the farm and build its infrastructure. Once established, these groups performed most of the agricultural work including planting and harvesting crops and tending to livestock. As Native labor was necessary for the operation of the Nome Cult Farm, government officials established a system of unfree labor in which Round Valley Native Americans did not have a choice of where or when they worked. Under this system, white wageworkers held the right to quit their job and had protection against corporal punishment in the workplace. In contrast, unfree workers of color could neither quit their job nor were offered protection against violent reprimand, most commonly in the form of whipping.

The Nome Cult Farm was under-resourced, with food shortages and lack of clothing leading to increased spread of illness and high death rates. As the Nome Cult Farm was not established by a treaty, the Nome Cult workers depended solely on U.S. government allocations, rather than treaty annuities which typically provide a higher degree of protection against resource shortages. Government agents failed to protect Indigenous women and children from kidnapping by white settlers who sold these individuals into slavery. Violence between white squatters and indigenous workers was also common at the farm and there were many instances of indigenous workers being murdered by white squatters who suffered no repercussions. By late 1858–1859, many Yukis and Nisenans had fled from the Nome Cult farm in an act of resistance, leading to a labor shortage.

=== Civil War era removals to Round Valley Reservation ===
The beginning of the Civil War in 1861 exacerbated labor conditions in Round Valley and diverted the military to the war front which made Native Americans increasingly vulnerable to kidnappings and enslavement. California also amended the Act for the Government and Protection of the Indians (1850) which expanded the permitted length of indentured servitude, revoked the requirement for parental consent, and permitted the indenture of “orphaned” children. During this time, the Nome Cult Farm was renamed Round Valley Reservation.

Many Indigenous families fled to the Round Valley Reservation in search of protection from the state militia and many others were forced onto the reservation involuntarily. The California state militia led removal campaigns against the Pit Rivers, Concows, and other northern Californian groups to the reservation. The relocated Concows fled the reservation in mid-1862, as an act of resistance against the violence they faced at Round Valley, returning to their homeland near what is today known as Chico, California. In the summer of 1863, General George Wright ordered Captain Augustus Starr to forcibly remove the Concows from John Bidwell's ranch to Round Valley reservation.

=== 1863 removal of the Concow Maidu ===
Starting at Camp Bidwell, the Concow Maidu were forced to march ten miles and camped at Colby's Ferry on the Sacramento River to rest, where there was food and water available. While the cavalry rode horses, those unable to travel by foot were brought via wagon along with additional supplies.

On 5 September, the group ferried across the Sacramento River and marched another ten miles to Stoney Creek, where the water was too salty to drink. The cavalry forced the weary and tired group to march another five miles before finally resting at Kirkpatrick Ranch. During the hot late summer night, nine Native Americans died from exhaustion and thirst. The mourners were given nearly no time to grieve and were forced by the cavalry to march another twelve miles from Kirkpatrick Ranch to James Ranch. During that night more perished from malnutrition and illness.

On 8 September the Native Americans were forced to hike six miles to Lacock Ranch on Thomas Creek. The wagons which had been transporting elders, children, and those too sick to walk, were returned to Chico at this point, and the group waited for four days along Thomas Creek for a mulepack train from Round Valley.

On the fifth day, Captain Starr marched the group of Native Americans to Mountain Home camp, moving three miles on foot. The party stayed at Mountain Home between 12 and 14 September. When the mule pack train arrived on 14 September, the group set out again, the majority of them on foot; those who were sick but well enough to travel rode muleback; one wagon carried the children. They left behind 150 Maidu who were too ill from malnourishment and the hardship of the journey, with only enough food supplies for a month. The weary group then traveled to camp at Cedar Springs, on a seven-mile march high into the Coast Range. The next day the group marched another six miles onward into the mountains, camping at Log Springs.

On 16 September their only wagon was abandoned at Log Springs. The group continued on foot and many struggled to continue the trip during the ten mile ascent into the mountains to Log Cabin, now known as "Government Camp" camping area. Continuing on, the Maidu were forced to climb the final three mile hike up to elevations beyond 6,000 ft (1,800 m), spending their last night on the journey at the junction of the South and Middle Forks of the Eel River, before their final descent into Round Valley. During the last difficult days of the journey, some mothers reportedly tried to kill their babies fearing their children would be abandoned if they were to die.

When news of the abandonment at Mountain House reached Fort Wright, the commandant Captain Douglas sent Superintendent James Short to bring food to those dying along the trail and several wagon teams to bring them back to the fort. After 13 days, Short was able to save only "a portion of them". According to a later report, Short described the horrific scene:

... about 150 sick Indians were scattered along the trail for 50 miles ... dying at the rate of 2 or 3 a day. They had nothing to eat ... and the wild hogs were eating them up either before or after they were dead.

Only slightly more than half of the original 461 members survived the march. Along with the 150 left behind at Mountain House, 32 others died en route, and 2 others escaped before the remaining 277 Maidu eventually arrived at the reservation on 18 September. Left there by the cavalrymen, they had too few supplies for the winter. Tribal members and their descendants tell stories of impatient soldiers using whips on the marchers, shooting anyone trying to escape, and beating the children against rocks and trees.

Tom-ya-yem, a Concow Maidu man forced on this march recounted the experience in a letter to Lieutenant Tassin:

The Indians continued their journey onward until reaching their destination. So I went with my people and camped in a meadow some five miles from Chico, and my brave and my mi-hi-nas [women] went out and worked for the Ad-sals for a whole year. But many of them became very sick with chills [probably malaria as well as the flu] and when the time came for us to go back to Nome-Cult they were so weak that they could scarcely walk, and many died on the trail, lying down sick and dying all the way from Chico to this place [Nome Cult Reservation’.

And when we got here there was nothing for us to eat, and my people began to fall as thick as the acorns in the fall of the year .. and there was no one here to do anything for us – the White Chief Doughlas [Capt. Doughlas, commander of the Army troops at Fort Wrigh], who sent his medicine man to take care of my sick, and Ad-sals and mules all the way to Chico to bring my people left dying on the trail – and here have remained ever since.

Are we happy here? No my brother [Lieutenant Tassin], no we have not been happy since we left our home.”

=== Historical context ===
The removal of the Concow Maidu along the Nome Cult Trail follows from a long history of settler colonialism and colonial resource extraction. As Bauer states in We Were All Like Migrant Workers Here:

“After the discovery of gold, white miners and ranchers poured into northern California. They found lush valleys that were amenable to raising livestock, rivers that promised to yield easy mineral wealth, and wild life teeming in the mountains. In order to reap the bounty, ranchers and farmers demanded access to Indian workers.”

Professor Jesse Dizard, Chair (2018) CSU Chico Department of Anthropology gives the following context:

The Concow Trail of Tears was not an isolated event. Tension between white settlers and Native American communities had been growing for years. The Gold Rush of 1849 brought hundreds of thousands to California, most of them young men who cared very little for the indigenous population and its way of life, or their claims to traditional lands. Indeed, the concept of human rights either did not exist or was strictly reserved for European-Americans. Native Americans were forced from their lands, had their children kidnapped, were forced into indentured servitude, or quite simply were murdered. Retaliatory action from Native Americans was met with swift and often violent retribution.

== Impact and legacy ==
Many scholars, including historian Benjamin Madley, have linked indigenous removal to Round Valley Reservation to the broader California genocidal campaign. In his journal article entitled “California’s Yuki Indians: Defining Genocide in Native American History,” Madley argues that six key characteristics that defined the treatment of Yuki at Round Valley Reservation as a holocaust:

First, vigilantes – rather than state employees – carried out most of the killing, kidnapping, and violence. Second, state and federal decision-makers enabled these acts. Third, the violence was almost entirely one-sided. Fourth, large numbers of Yuki died due to willful neglect under federal custody. Fifth, this catastrophe fits the Genocide Convention definition. Finally, the Yuki case challenges Cook’s long-standing supposition that disease was the leading cause of death among California Indians under United States rule.

While Madley focuses specifically on the Yukis, the Konkow Maidu were also present at the reservation and experienced the same violence and destruction under the same system as the Yuki at the Round Valley Reservation.

Professors Frank Chalk and Kurt Jonassohn echo Madley's argument in their book The History and Sociology of Genocide: The authors argue that the violence against the Yuki in Northern California is “a clearer case of genocide” as “the impact of kidnapping, epidemics, starvation, vigilante justice, and state-sanctioned mass killing” contributed to the dramatic population decline of the Yuki people.

Scholars have also argued that the establishment of the Nome Cult Farm / Round Valley reservation set the stage for further labor and land exploitation as Baumgardner explains in his book Killing for Land in Early California:

In Round Valley, California, as well as in numerous other frontier settlements throughout the West, many Native Americans lived out their lives working to help build Euro-American farms and ranches that were the forerunners of the agribusiness corporate giants of today.

The removal of indigenous Northern California has also been viewed through the lens of environmental injustice. Land dispossession and natural resource exploitation (through unsustainable agricultural production and cattle ranching) encouraged the exploitation of Indigenous bodies through removal, enslavement, kidnapping, and sexual violence. Through an analysis of newspaper articles published in the Red Bluff Beacon, Dr. Brendan Lindsay argues that:

Settlers and ranchers, particularly those who had lost animals in stock raid, were tempted by a new, easily accessible source for replacement animals. Worse still, the human resources represented by Native people, especially women and children, made Nome Cult and Nome Lackee popular places to obtain low-cost laborers, slaves, and women to rape.

An annual 100-mile Nome Cult Trail Walk is hosted annually by members of the Round Valley Reservation to commemorate the trek their ancestors were forced to make from Chico to Round Valley. This walk was established in 1996 and as scholars Dr. Damon Akins and Dr. William Bauer state, the walk "has been instrumental in the process by which Round Valley Indians heal historical trauma.”

A small 4-mile (6.4 km) section exists and is part of the Nome Cult Mountain House Trail as part of a number of hiking trails in Mendocino National Forest.
