= Mill Creek (Tehama County) =

Stream in northern California, US

Mill Creek is a large stream in northern California. It is an eastside tributary of the Sacramento River, draining an area of 134 square miles (350 km^{2}) and flowing for 56.5 miles (90.9 km). The creek begins in Shasta County, California, but almost immediately flows into Tehama County, California. The creek's source is a thermal spring at an elevation of 8,200 feet (2,500 m) in Lassen Volcanic National Park. At first, the creek flows roughly south while meandering to the east and west, but the lower two-thirds of the creek flow roughly southwest until it reaches the Sacramento River at an elevation of only 200 feet (61 m), just north of Los Molinos, California.

In the creek's upper reaches, it flows through meadows and dense forests. Later, it descends through a steep canyon and flows into the Sacramento Valley. It flows about 8 miles (13 km) in the valley before it reaches its confluence with the Sacramento River. The creek is in excellent condition, due to the upper two-thirds of it being in the protected lands of Lassen Volcanic National Park and Lassen National Forest. There are no storage dams or reservoirs on the creek, but there are several diversion dams after it reaches the Sacramento Valley. The creek is home to Spring Run Chinook Salmon and Central Valley Steelhead (both endangered), Fall Run Chinook Salmon, and Pacific Lamprey.

Mill Creek received its name in the 1840s by an explorer who proposed watermills be built along its course.

Mill Creek is primarily in private ownership. Many of the property owners participate in the Mill Creek Conservancy, a 501(c)(3) organization formed in 1994 by local landowners, local community, and others committed to the continued protection and management of Mill Creek's historically pristine ecosystem by promoting resource protection and compatible land usage through cooperative efforts between landowners, federal and state agencies and other stakeholders. Partners include the Los Molinos Mutual Water Company, California’s Department of Fish & Wildlife, the U.S. Fish & Wildlife Service, the Nature Conservancy, and many other agencies and conservation organizations to create ongoing programs that protect and enhance the survival of Mill Creek's threatened and endangered Chinook salmon and steelhead populations.
