= Kari Norgaard =

American sociologist

Kari Marie Norgaard
- Education: Humboldt State University; Washington State University; University of Oregon
- Scientific career
- Fields: Sociology
- Workplaces: University of Oregon
- Thesis: Community, place, and privilege: double realities, denial, and climate change in Norway (2003)

Kari Marie Norgaard is a professor of sociology at the University of Oregon, a post she has held since 2017. She is known for her research into Indigenous environmental justice, climate change denial and the politics of global warming.

== Indigenous environmental justice ==
Norgaard has worked with the Karuk tribe on many projects, including undamming the Klamath River.

== Research into social denial ==
To investigate the lack of response in Western societies to the implications of global warming, Norgaard collected ethnographic data and took interviews in a rural community in west Norway during the winter of 2000–2001 when unusually warm conditions damaged the skiing industry and prevented ice fishing. Both local and national media linked the problems to global warming, and while the public treated this as common knowledge, they failed to demand a political response or change their own fuel usage. She investigated described this form of denial on various levels. The conventional information deficit model explained opposition or indifference by assuming that the public are ill-informed or misinformed, but in Norway a well informed public showed declining interest in the issue. Her interviews revealed that their response to an apparently insuperable problem was comparable to the condition called psychic numbing. Adopting Eviatar Zerubavel's concept of socially organized denial, she saw this as a collective form of what Stanley Cohen had called implicatory denial.

She published her research in journals, changing the names of individuals and giving the fictional name of "Bygdaby" to the community.

The work was then developed into the book Living in Denial: Climate Change, Emotions, and Everyday Life, published by the MIT Press in March 2011.

== Responses to research ==
The Oxford Handbook of Climate Change and Society published in August 2011 described the uniqueness of the research, and the relevance for people worldwide.

In a statement on 5 January 2012 announcing its decision on use of terms when discussing climate change denial, the National Center for Science Education highlighted Norgaard's concept of implicit denial as discussed in her book, which they said was getting increasing interest from academics investigating climate change controversy.

On 28 March 2012, Norgaard co-chaired a session of the "Planet Under Pressure Conference" in London, which a paper she had co-authored with Robert Brulle and Randolph Haluza-DeLay. Two days in advance, the University of Oregon issued a press release which opened by describing their message as "Resistance at individual and societal levels must be recognized before real action can be taken to effectively address threats facing the planet from human-caused contributions to climate change." Her work suggests a need to recognise climate denial and address it with dialogue. She returned from the conference to find that Rush Limbaugh had targeted the opening paragraph of the press release on his show, and at his urging several hundred individuals had sent her acrimonious emails. Time magazine described this as bullying, comparable to the verbal abuse addressed to climate scientist Katharine Hayhoe.

== Videography ==
- “Talking Roads: Transportation and Climate Adaptation in Karuk Country” with Jenny Stormy Staats and Bruno Seraphin (12 minutes) March 2022
- “Fire Belongs Here” 2019 with Jenny Stormy Staats and Bruno Seraphin (2 minutes)
- “pananu’thívthaaneen xúus nu’êethtiheesh: We’re Caring For Our World” 2019 (30 minutes)
- “Revitalizing Our Relationship with Fire” 2018 with Jenny Stormy Staats and Bruno Seraphin (6 minutes)

== Selected works ==
=== Books ===
- Norgaard, Kari (2011). Living in Denial Climate Change, Emotions, and Everyday Life. Cambridge, Mass: MIT Press. ISBN 978-0-262-01544-8.
- Norgaard, Kari (2019). Salmon and Acorns Feed Our People: Colonialism, Nature ad Social Action. Rutgers University Press. ISBN 9780813584195.

=== Publications ===
- Norgaard, K. M. (2006a). ""People want to protect themselves a little bit": Emotions, denial, and social movement nonparticipation". Sociological Inquiry. 76 (3): 372–396. doi:10.1111/j.1475-682x.2006.00160.x.
- Norgaard, K. M. (2006b). """We Don't Really Want To Know" Environmental Justice and Socially Organized Denial of Global Warming in Norway". Organization & Environment. 19 (3): 347–370. doi:10.1177/1086026606292571. hdl:1794/19943. S2CID 145104308.
- Norgaard, K. M. (2019). "Making sense of the spectrum of climate denial". Critical Policy Studies. 13 (4): 437–441. doi:10.1080/19460171.2019.1671208. S2CID 204380155.

=== Research reports ===
- Norgaard, Kari M. (May 2016). Karuk Climate Transportation Plaun (Report).
- Norgaard, Kari M. (2019). Karuk Climate Adaption Plan (Report).
- Karuk Tribe (2016). Climate Vulnerability Assessment (Report).
- Karuk Tribe (2014). Karuk Traditional Ecological Knowledge and the Need for Knowledge Sovereignty: Social, Cultural, and Economic Impacts of Denied Access to Traditional Management (Report).
- Karuk Tribe (2014). Retaining Knowledge Sovereignty: Practical Steps Towards Expanding the Application of Karul Traditional Knowledge in the Face of Climate Change (Report).

=== Non-refereed publications and podcasts ===
- "On Indigenous Land Management and a Space Beyond Colonialism". Salmon and Acorns (Podcast). This is Hell. January 23, 2020.
- Norgaard, Kari M.; Worl, Sara (October 19, 2019). "What Western States can Learn From Native American Fire Management Strategies". The Conversation.
- Norgaard, Kari M. (October 2019). "Colonization, Fire Suppression, and Indigenous Resurgence in the Face of Climate Change". YES Magazine.
- Norgaard, Kari M. (January 17, 2016). "Climate Change is a Social Issue". Chronicle.

=== Research in the news ===
- "Challenging Colonialism: Weapons of Mass Destruction p.1" (Podcast). Apple Podcasts. February 2022.
