= Gary Clayton Anderson =

American historian and writer

- Born: 1948 (age 77–78)
- Education: Concordia College; University of South Dakota; University of Toledo
- Occupations: Historian, writer

Gary Clayton Anderson (born 1948) is an American historian and writer. He was the George Lynn Cross Research Professor in the department of history at the University of Oklahoma.

In 2023, Anderson wrote the book Will Rogers and His America, published by the University of Oklahoma Press.
