= Forced labor in California =

Labour laws in the United States

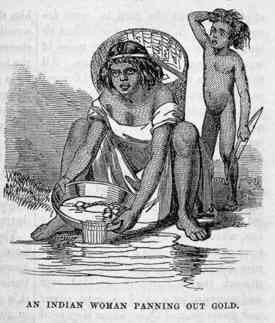
1850 depiction of an Indigenous woman panning for gold during the California gold rush

Forced labor of Native Americans in California spanned from the Spanish missions of the 18th century to the gold rush era of the mid-19th century. Native Californians were subject to systematic exploitation, forced labor, and cultural disruption.

== Background ==
=== Spanish California ===
Pre-European contact, the estimated population of Indigenous people in present day California varies with accounts ranging from 300,000 to nearly one million. Spaniards first arrived in California when explorer Juan Rodriguez Cabrillo landed in San Diego Bay in 1542, however, the Spanish didn't successfully settle the region until 1769 when Padre Junípero Serra founded the first Spanish mission, el Misión San Diego de Alcalá, located in modern-day San Diego.

While Native Californians were treated with differing levels of respect from the padres who oversaw them, many of the Spanish soldiers in the area at the time, saw them solely as manpower to be exploited. These soldiers would often force the Native Californians to perform most of the manual labor needed in their fortresses and would hunt down any Native people who refused or tried to escape. These fortresses consisted of four military installations, primarily in place to reinforce Spanish claims to Alta California. They were known as el Presidio Real de San Carlos de Monterey, el Presidio Real de San Diego, el Presidio Real de San Francisco, and el Presidio Real de Santa Bárbara. The soldiers occupying these fortresses would treat the Native people poorly, often raping the Native women of the villages.

Due to the conditions that the Native people were forced into, there were several recorded uprisings where Native Californians resisted Spanish rule. One of the earliest instances of these uprisings was the attack on Mission San Diego de Alcalá on November 4, 1775. The Tipai-Ipai organized around 800 Native Californians from nine different villages to destroy the mission, killing three Spaniards in the process. The Tipai-Ipai were successful in their goal, burning the original mission down prior to the reconstruction of it in 1769. Despite this instance, not every Native Californian uprising was violent. An example of this can be seen in September 1795, when over two hundred Native people deserted San Francisco in droves, citing their poor treatment at the hands of Spanish soldiers and priests as their reason for abandoning the area. Regardless of the nature of the uprisings conducted by Native Californians, they were met with harsh punishments at the hands of the Spanish. Even Native people who conducted nonviolent forms of resistance such as deserting missions were punished by being hunted down and forced to return to where they were attempting to flee from. Other punishments for instances of resistance include execution or imprisonment while subjected to harsh labor.

=== Mexican California ===
After Mexico gained its independence from Spain in 1821, California became a Mexican territory. In 1824, the Mexican constitution guaranteed citizenship to "all persons", which provided Native Californians with the right to continue occupying their villages. However, the same year, the Mexican National Congress passed the Colonization Act of 1824 which granted large sections of unoccupied land to individuals in an effort to promote agriculture and economic development in California. While this act can be seen as a negative for Native people during this time as it created and enforced a large class division between Native Californians and the new rancheros in the area, it also allowed for many Native people to learn how to grow crops which would prove to be an essential skill.

In August 1833, the Mexican government passed the Mexican Secularization Act, which secularized missions in an effort to transfer the land in which the missions were built from the Catholic Church to private individuals. In doing so, the Mexican government hoped to promote private enterprise and settlement throughout California, however, this would prove to be detrimental to the Native Californians who resided near or on these missions. While this act did state that around half of the mission's land was to be given to the Native people who resided and worked there, very few Native people actually received this compensation. Instead, many civil authorities confiscated most of the land for themselves as a majority of the Native people were ill-equipped to accept the land that they were promised. Rather, the Native people who lived on these missions were further exploited by the rancheros who took over, being forced to work for virtually nothing.

=== Population of Native Californians ===
Native California population, according to Cook 1978

Throughout the settlement of California, the Indigenous population of the state dropped from 300,000 during Spanish rule in 1769 to 250,000 in 1834. This significant population drop is widely attributed to increased contact with new diseases brought by settlers coming into California from other parts of the world. Additionally, after gaining independence from Spain in 1821 and the secularization of the coastal missions by the Mexican government in 1834, the Indigenous population suffered a much more drastic decrease in population.

In the wake of American settlers streaming into California during the 1820s, it was officially acquired by the United States in 1848. Under U.S. sovereignty, the Native American population plummeted from an estimated 150,000 to 30,000, reaching a low of 16,000 in 1900.

== Settlement of California ==
=== U.S. acquisition and consequences of the Gold Rush ===
The acquisition of California by the United States in 1848 drastically impacted the Native American population in the area. As settlers began flooding into the state during the subsequent Gold Rush in 1849, Native Californians found themselves once again drastically impacted by the ensuing societal upheaval.

The influx of settlers coming into California during this time resulted in further displacement of Native Californians from their land. Settlers seeking gold and agricultural opportunities in California would exploit the Native Americans they encountered for labor and economic gains, often subjecting them to harsh working conditions in various industries including mining, agriculture, and ranching. The arrival of these settlers also affected the lives of the Indigenous population by introducing new diseases that they had not encountered before. This would further deplete the Native American population within California, making them more vulnerable to exploitation and manipulation as their communities became weakened.

The establishment of reservation systems within the United States was promoted as a way to concentrate and protect Native American populations. However, it too became a mechanism for further labor control of Native people. Under the reservation system, life for the Indigenous population was harsh and labor was often a condition for receiving rations and other forms of support from the government. This would prove to be detrimental for Native Americans as it effectively destroyed Native autonomy and created a cycle of dependency within their community on the United States government.

=== California genocide ===
American settlers who came to California during the Gold Rush often found themselves at odds with the Native people of the area. The confrontation between Native people and Americans was often brutal, resulting in the enslavement, murder, and rape of Native Californian men, women, and children. As more hostile interactions began to take place between Native people and Americans, incidents such as the Bloody Island massacre near Clear Lake of 1849 began to take place. During the Gold Rush, the Native population of the Central Valley and adjacent hills and mountains decreased from around 150,000 to 50,000.

Between 1851 and 1852, the federal government appointed three Native American commissioners—Redick McKee, George W. Barbour, and O. M. Wozencraft—to negotiate treaties with Native Californians. At the time, Native tribes were recognized as foreign nations, making treaties the legal form of negotiation. However, the commissioners that were appointed knew nothing about Native Californians or their culture, making the process extremely difficult. 18 treaties were drafted, allocating 7.5% of the state of California to Native Californians residing in reservations. However, in June 1852, all of the treaties were rejected by the Senate and marked as classified documents; they were not seen again until 1905.

=== U.S. legislature ===
Despite being admitted to the Union as a free state on September 9, 1850, the 1850 Act for the Government and Protection of Indians allowed for the indenture of Native Californians. This act introduced a system of custodianship for Indigenous children and established convict leasing as a form of forced labor. These systems were supported by the legal authorization of corporal punishment for Native Americans and stripped them of numerous legal rights. In 1860, the Act was amended to allow any Native Californians who were not already indentured to be kidnapped under the guise of apprenticeship. In an 1867 analysis done for the Secretary of War, it was noted that the rapid advancement of American settlements had greatly depleted sources of fish, wild fowl, game, nuts, and roots. By 1870, the population of Native Californians had declined from 40,000 at the time of the United States acquisition of California to 20,000.

=== Abolition ===
During the American Civil War various political factions in opposition to slavery and other forms of forced labor united as the Union Party and began to slowly dismantle forced labor systems in California. Republicans had decried the kidnapping and forced apprenticeship of Native Americans but still viewed the arrests and leasing of Native Americans as a necessary evil to civilize them.

In April 1863, after the declaration of the Emancipation Proclamation, the California legislature abolished all forms of legal indenture and apprenticeship for Native Americans. Illegal slave raiding and holding continued afterwards but died out around 1870. The end came due to the increase in European and Chinese immigrants that served as cheap laborers, and the massive reduction of California's Indigenous population.

== Labor system ==
=== Illegal practices ===
In general, Californians interpreted these 1850 laws in a way that all Indians could face indentured servitude through arrests and "hiring out". Once the Indians had entered into this servitude, the term limit was often ignored, thus resulting in slavery; this was what Californians used to "satisfy the states high demand for domestic servants and agricultural laborers". Kidnapping raids became commonplace; these raids were done to acquire Indigenous people that settlers could press into servitude. Although technically an illegal practice, law enforcement rarely intervened. The well-being of those in forced labor was often easily disregarded since laborers could be acquired for prices as cheap as 35 dollars.

Acting Governor Richard B. Mason reported that, "over half the miners in California were Indians". The enforcement of the Act of 1850 was left with the local justices of peace, meaning they became crucial links in all interracial interactions. Many justices took advantage of the vague language and the power bestowed upon them to continue the kidnapping of Indian children through 1860.

An illegal trade of kidnapped slaves existed and was rarely stopped; it was only policed after the abolition of the forced labor systems.

=== Laws ===
After the Mexican-American War, the population of California began to grow, with predominantly new arrivals from states within the United States like Missouri, Kentucky, and other parts of Southern states where slavery was legal. The first Californian state legislature took place in April 1850, about five months before becoming the 31st state to be implemented as a free state in the United States. During this time the legislatures had enacted the Act for the Government and Protection of Indians, also known as the Indian Indenture Act, which was primarily used to overlay governance on Native Americans rather than implementing protection over them. In turn, this allowed White settlers to hire Native Americans for their labor. The Act was created to help employers deal with the high cost of labor and the mobility of free labor since the beginning of the Gold Rush. The Act was created to maintain and prolong the established workforce of Native Americans that was previously being used during the years of the Mexican government's reign. Both Mexico and the state of California, by the time of its establishment as a state in the United States, had officially outlawed slavery within their territories.

Unfree Native American labor can predominantly be seen in certain counties within California such as the county of Colusa. Between 1850 and 1865 the practice had great impacts on economic developments within the county. Native workers essentially filled the important gaps that were not met by free White-wage workers. This led a majority of Natives to engage in different forms of labor were women and children, who were usually from neighboring or distant Californian counties. Their legal restrictions led towards intensive labor that would be based on child custody and apprenticeship provisions that were outlined in section 3 of the Indian Indenture Act.

In section 3 of the law, authority was given to the employers to gain child custody of Native Americans until the age of maturity. Which was measured differently on the basis of gender, which would be the root of many provisions. Males would not reach the freedom of child custody till the age of eighteen and females till the age of fifteen. This would broadly need the consent of parents and/or friends. First needing to bring themselves and the child to the justice of peace, who had the authority to grant the certificate of custody. Following this, section 4 of the law would further expand on the certificate holder to feed, clothe, and care for their person. It would also extend to inhuman treatments punishable by a fine and ultimately the loss of the child.

Adjustments were made towards Section 3 of the act of 1860, which led to bound labor by transforming caretaker agreements for Native minors into a system on similar grounds to indentured servitude. After this adjustment, the section connected itself to apprenticeship, a broad term that not only affected Native children but also Native adults who would be identified as prisoners of war or broadly termed as vagrants by the courts. It included a shift to supervisory powers from township justice of the peace to higher levels of government and law, such as county and district court judges. Section 3's revelation mandated that employers offer forms of training to Native supervisees as apprentices in various forms of trade and employment. It granted employers authority to train Native American minors beyond the age cap. It was followed by an implementation that if individuals were indentured servants before reaching fourteen, their term of service would automatically be extended till the ages of twenty-five for males and twenty-one for females. Native indentured servants between the ages of fourteen and twenty would be extended even to further to the ages of twenty-five and thirty. Adults entering indentured servitude, or an apprenticeship would face a fixed term of ten years. Employers would retain control over all earnings of those under their control, also not being obligated to give compensation after the completion of the services conducted by Native Americans.

The Act for the Government and Protection of Indians was passed in California in 1850, It provided that:

- "White persons or proprietors could apply to the Justice of Peace for the removal of Indians from lands in the white person's possession"
- "Any person could go before a Justice of Peace to obtain Indian children for indenture. The Justice determined whether or not compulsory means were used to obtain the child. If the Justice was satisfied that no coercion occurred, the person obtains a certificate that authorized him to have the care, custody, control and earnings of an Indian until their age of majority (for males, eighteen years, for females, fifteen years)." In actual practice this section lead to a trade system of kidnapped Indian children, either stolen from their parents or taken from the results of militia attacks during the 1850s and 1860s. Frontier whites often eagerly paid $50–$100 for Indian children to apprentice and so groups of kidnappers would often raid isolated Indian villages, snatching up children in the chaos of battle.
- "If a convicted Indian was punished by paying a fine, any white person, with the consent of the Justice, could give bond for the Indian's fine and costs. In return, the Indian was "compelled to work until his fine was discharged or cancelled." The person bailing was supposed to "treat the Indian humanely and clothe and feed him properly." The Court decided "the allowance given for such labor."" Local authorities were often required to hire out the "convicts" within the next 24 hours to the highest bidder essentially creating a system of selling slaves out of jail.
- Indians could not testify for or against whites. It was illegal to sell or administer alcohol to Indians and if Indians were convicted of stealing any valuable or livestock, they could receive any number of lashes (as long as it was less than 25) and a fine of up to $200.

==== Laws in practice ====
The reality of the purpose of "The Act for the Government and Protection of Indians " is revealed through the initial name given to the bill "An Act relative to the Protection, Punishment and Government of Indians " proposed by Senator E. Kirby Chamberlain at the request of Senator John Bidwell. A note of interest is both congress members were involved in businesses that were labor-intensive ( such as owning gold mines or ranches) and The Act for the Government and Protection of Indians would help expand the labor supply for those industries. So commonplace were these kidnappings that William H. Brewer a member conducting the California Geological Survey on behalf of the state credited that most of "The Indian wars now going on, and those which have been for the last three years in the counties of Klamath, Humboldt, and Mendocino, have most of their origin in this. It has for years been a regular business to steal Indian children and bring them down to the civilized parts of the state, even to San Francisco, and sell them – not as slaves, but as servants to be kept as long as possible. ".

Another aspect of the Act that in practice was executed poorly was the role of the Justice of Peace. They essentially had complete control over the outcome of the trial and it is written in the act that no "white man" could be convicted due to testimony from an "Indian". The Act was designed to benefit those in power who were white men. It is revealed in the wording and the structure of the act itself. A white man could not be convicted by the very people they are taking to court. If a Native person attempted to defend themselves, once a Justice of the peace made a decision that was it, there was no process to file for an appeal on behalf of a Native person.

=== Labor roles ===
The Gold Rush brought many American migrants to California. As a result, this rapid population increase required an increase in food production. Many bound laborers are thought to have been used in California's new agricultural economy. A majority of the laborers leased were Native women and children, who were leased in response to California's population shortage of white women and children. Many would serve as domestic workers while others would be forced into prostitution by the often role outside of the auxiliary of the household needs.

== Prostitution as a system of forced labor ==
=== Trafficking of Indigenous women ===
Even before the Gold rush, the informal mechanism of forced labor for women was present in California. In the Spanish Mission period, Spanish soldiers who accompanied the missionaries and their supply lines were stationed near tribe settlements. Routinely assault or sexual extortion was compensated with food and money to avoid repercussions for soldiers to avoid punishment from the local mission authorities by claiming it was a trade of prostitution instead. These incidents were common through the Mission period leading to several altercations of Native Tribes and Spanish soldiers due to the assault of Indigenous women.

The assault on Indigenous women worsened as greater autonomy over California was given to the loyalists during the Mexican independence movement, with large sums of authority and land given to Californios rather than returned to the tribes upon the mission's dissolution. The resulting collapse of the formal institution of agriculture for the indentured Indigenous families led to an increase in famines, then saw an increase in dependency-based prostitution among Indigenous women trying to provide for their families. This informal system prevailed into the Mexican–American War annexation of California as new incursions of migrant male workers entered from all sides of California, exposing and dragging new tribes into the demand of the American West sex trade. American notions of ethnic and racial values placed Indigenous women at the lowest stratification under Chinese and Mexican women, making them prime candidates for physical abuse, economic exploitation, and trafficking for male sexual gratification.

During the Gold Rush era in California, a surge in immigration to the state led to a shortage of white women and children, which gave rise to a market of trafficked labor from Native American women and girls. This phenomenon, which thrived during the 1850s and 1860s, predates the California Gold Rush in rural areas and has historical roots in Indigenous and Spanish-Mexican communities.

Driven by the demand for labor because of the Gold Rush, specifically in the field of domestic work, Californio communities crept further and further into the state's interior to capture Native American women and girls. These abducted individuals would go on to fulfill a variety of purposes, including sex, domestic labor, marriage, and even childbearing for their captors. Over time, this exchange grew increasingly lucrative and highly profitable, attracting the attention of white entrepreneurs in the state.

In the decade following the California Gold Rush, the capture and exchange of Native American women and girls would become an integral part of the social fabric of Northwestern California. Legal frameworks in the region, especially wardship and apprenticeship laws, only partially covered the market of bound and trafficked women, with a significant portion being forced and bound illegally through captivity.

Regardless of the status of their captivity, either legal or illegal, Native American women and girls trapped in the traffics of their labor faced dual forms of exploitation as they were bought and sold to satisfy the needs for labor and sexual lust. Once ripped away from their families and communities, these women and girls suffered differing fates. Captive females often experienced control over both their labor and their sexuality as their captors would exchange them in the trafficking market to serve as domestic laborers and coerced sexual partners.

By 1860, the involuntary market of captive Native American women and girls had become so widespread that it drew the attention of the Sacramento Daily Union, a newspaper with ties to the northern branch of the Democratic Party, which officially declared that a new form of slavery was occurring in California at the hands of the white men who dominated the trade by the mid-1850s and that it degraded the free-state status of the state.

=== Trafficking of Chinese women ===
The rapid influx of Chinese migrants to California in the 19th century led to further diversification of the region's population. Many Chinese migrants were male workers, often working jobs to send money to their families back home. This rapid influx of male Chinese workers to California saw an influx in the male population without a proportional increase of women, leading to the commodification and exporting of Chinese women to the United States.

In San Francisco, the division of ethnicity along social disreputable stratification associated with Anglo-Americans that women of other ethnicities in these places as inherently immoral and made the generalization of all present ethnic and racial women participated in prostitution or were available for denigration with the intent of sexual gratification through coercion or violence.

In the year 1880 there were 27 Chinese men for every one Chinese woman in the United States. With this low percentage of the population, the stigma of Chinese women being prostitutes, as the total number of Chinese women in the state was low, and the number of prostitutes in this low demographic meant that the public eye saw all Chinese women as prostitutes. Chinese women who migrated to the United States often found themselves forced into prostitution, known as "yellow slavery" which in turn created a large stigma associated with Chinese women being lewd and prostitutes whether they found themselves in the industry or not.

Many of the women who were brought to California in the 19th century experienced this form of "yellow slavery" by being brought to California with the idea of becoming brides of the Chinese male labor force or the white Americans already there. Upon their arrival to the state, they found themselves forced into concubines or in worse conditions.

Many of the women who were not concubines for wealthy merchants found themselves in Chinatown brothels, forced to service the men of San Francisco. Many of these brothels saw a large influx of women, resulting in the older, less "desirable" women being forced into small rooms with windows facing the street with the job of attracting men from off the street to their location.

Women like Ah Toy, the first Chinese Prostitute in California, were able to claim an active role in the self-management of her sex work, like later Anglo prostitutes, but racially motivated retaliation forced her to return to China. Yet upon her return, she was relegated to racial stratification as Anglo Women and prostitutes' presence in San Francisco stratified Chinese women into similar denigration of low value-high demand forced labor. At the same time Chinese triads began to facilitate the growth of the sex industry in California through the trafficking of Chinese and other Asian women.

=== Trafficking of other women of color ===
While heavily focused on Indigenous and Chinese women, other affected groups in the forced sexual labor market of California, such as Hawaiian, Polynesian, and Latina women, were trafficked into prostitution because of the gender imbalance in California. Women of color made up the majority of the prostitution in California, and their limited economic opportunity in an increasingly anglicized California society exacerbated their conditions and vulnerability, making them susceptible to sexual violence and trafficking into the late 19th century.

== See also ==
- Convict leasing
- Peonage
- Slavery in the colonial history of the United States
- Slavery in the United States

== Bibliography ==
- Magliari, Michael (2012). "Free State Slavery: Bound Indian Labor and Slave Trafficking in California's Sacramento Valley, 1850–1864". Pacific Historical Review. 81 (2): 155–192. doi:10.1525/phr.2012.81.2.155. JSTOR 10.1525/phr.2012.81.2.155.
- Smith, Stacey L. (2013). Freedom's Frontier: California and the Struggle over Unfree Labor, Emancipation, and Reconstruction. University of North Carolina Press. ISBN 978-1-4696-0768-9. JSTOR 10.5149/9781469607696_smith.
