= Golden State Salmon Association =

American nonprofit conservation body

- Golden State Salmon Association
- Abbreviation: GSSA
- Formation: 2010
- Founded at: San Francisco, California, United States
- Type: Nonprofit
- Tax ID no.: EIN 27-4187163
- Legal status: Charitable organization
- Purpose: Restore California salmon for their economic, recreational, commercial, environmental, cultural and health values.
- Location: American Canyon, California, US
- Region served: California
- Official language: English
- Executive Director: Scott Artis
- Board of directors: board of directors
- Website: www.goldenstatesalmon.org
- Formerly called: Golden Gate Salmon Association

Golden State Salmon Association (GSSA) is a US non-profit organization dedicated to the conservation and restoration of California's salmon, primarily Chinook salmon, and their freshwater streams, rivers, and coastal habitats for their economic, recreational, commercial, environmental, cultural and health benefits. The organization began in 2010 in San Francisco, California, as the Golden Gate Salmon Association.

== History ==
Golden State Salmon Association was established in 2010 by a coalition of commercial and recreational salmon fishermen and women who were interested in accelerating the recovery of California's Central Valley fall-run Chinook salmon. The organization operated as Golden Gate Salmon Association before changing its name to Golden State Salmon Association in September 2019.

Golden State Salmon Association is a non-voting, member-based regional organization that works with state and federal elected and non-elected officials, regulatory agencies, conservation organizations, commercial and recreational fishing businesses, fishing clubs, Tribes, and legal organizations. The current president and executive director is Scott Artis, who has been with Golden State Salmon Association since March 2023.

The organization has developed various programs to help prioritize the restoration and conservation of salmon and their river and coastal habitats. These programs include a focus on water policy, hatchery improvement, habitat restoration, and experiential learning.

== Areas of focus ==
- Improving Water Flows and Providing Adequate Water Temperatures for Salmon: The organization develops and implements strategies for restoring California salmon and advocates for strong State and U.S. federal fish and water policies. They do this by mobilizing individuals to take action against water mismanagement, uses strategic litigation to defend salmon and the salmon industry, and works with agencies, nonprofit organizations, elected officials, policymakers, and businesses.
- Hatchery Improvement: The organization works to achieve state and federal fish hatchery improvements by advocating for and procuring funding to increase overall fish hatchery production goals, and working with the California Department of Fish and Wildlife and United States Fish and Wildlife Service to find suitable release locations, and influence when, where and how hatchery salmon fry and smolts are released into rivers or the San Francisco Bay to increase survival and salmon returns.
- Restoring Spawning and Rearing Habitat for Salmon: The organization advocates and facilitates floodplain and side channel restoration to improve spawning and rearing habitat for salmon. Tactics can include adding gravel to riverbeds, improving water depth and flow, and removing barriers that block fish passage.
- Experiential Education: The organization provides inner city and disadvantaged students with hands-on fisheries learning experiences including opportunities to participate in California Department of Fish and Wildlife hatchery salmon smolt releases and charter boat ocean fishing trips in the San Francisco Bay.

== Political action ==
On July 5, 2023, Tribes, and California fishing, conservation, and environmental justice organizations held a rally at the California State Capitol in response to the declining Central Valley fall-run Chinook salmon populations, which resulted in the closure of the 2023 California salmon fishing season, and diminishing water quality that has caused harmful algal blooms in the San Francisco Bay-Delta estuary. Shingle Springs Band of Miwok Indians, Winnemem Wintu Tribe, Hoopa Valley Tribe, Karuk Tribe, Round Valley Indian Tribes, Pit River Tribe, Mechoopda Indian Tribe, Sogorea Te Land Trust, Restore the Delta, Save California Salmon, Golden State Salmon Association, Sacred Places Institute, California Indian Environmental Alliance, Little Manila Rising, Indigenous Justice, San Francisco Baykeeper, North Coast Native Protectors, Sierra Club California, Friends of the River, and Tuolumne River Trust.

== Litigation ==
On January 23, 2024, Golden State Salmon Association, The Bay Institute, California Indian Environmental Alliance, Restore the Delta, San Francisco Baykeeper, and the Shingle Springs Band of Miwok Indians filed a lawsuit against the California Department of Water Resources for violating the California Environmental Quality Act (CEQA). The groups asserted that when the agency finalized approval for the state's Delta Conveyance Project (also known as the Delta Tunnel) in December 2023, it failed to consider, avoid, or mitigate the wide range of negative effects the project would have on Tribal and other historically marginalized communities, as well as on endangered fish populations and other wildlife.
