= Kabyai Creek =

Kabyai Creek Kaibai Creek

Location
- Country: United States
- State: California
- Region: Shasta County, Shasta County

Physical characteristics
- Source: Kabyai Creek
  - location: canyon on the west bank of McCloud River, within the Shasta–Trinity National Forest, Shasta County, California, United States
  - coordinates: 40°57′01″N 122°16′06″W
  - elevation: 2,320 ft (710 m)
- Mouth: Kabyai Creek
  - location: McCloud River, Shasta–Trinity National Forest, Shasta County, California
  - coordinates: 40°55′59″N 122°15′01″W
  - elevation: 1,079 ft (329 m)
- Discharge
  - location: McCloud River

Kabyai Creek or Kaibai Creek is a tributary of the McCloud River in Shasta County, California. It flows into the river opposite the McCloud Bridge Campground in the Shasta–Trinity National Forest.

== History ==
The mouth of Kabyai Creek, was the site of a Winnemem Wintu village, that suffered an attack by a party of white settlers, the Kabyai Creek Massacre on August 17, 1854. The burial site of the massacre is among those of the Winnemem Wintu being threatened with being submerged by Shasta Lake if the proposed raising of Shasta Dam occurs.
