= Coleman National Fish Hatchery =

Fsh hatchery in Shasta County, California

Coordinates: 40°24′2″N 122°8′40″W

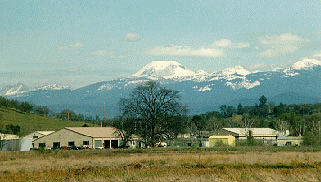
Coleman National Fish Hatchery (foreground), Mount Lassen (background).

In 1942, the Coleman National Fish Hatchery (Coleman NFH) was established under an act of the U.S. Congress to mitigate the loss of historic spawning habitat caused by the construction of dams. The fish hatchery is located in Shasta County, California, near the town of Anderson on the north bank of Battle Creek approximately 6 river miles (9.7 km) east of the Sacramento River. Coleman NFH covers approximately 75 acres (300,000 m^{2}) of land owned by the U.S. Fish and Wildlife Service (USFWS), with an additional 63 acres (250,000 m^{2}) of land in perpetual easements for pipelines and access. It is the largest salmon hatchery in the continental United States.

Before the construction of the Shasta and Keswick Dams, Chinook Salmon and steelhead were free to migrate to the upper reaches of the Sacramento, Pit and McCloud Rivers to spawn. Chinook salmon and steelhead returning from the ocean, travel up the Sacramento River and Battle Creek where they are enticed by water flow into the hatchery. Eggs are collected, fertilized and incubated artificially until they hatch. The young fish are then raised in ponds at the hatchery until they are sufficient size to be released and return to the ocean. Long term production goals for Coleman NFH Complex are as follows: 12,000,000 fall Chinook salmon, 1,200,000 late-fall Chinook salmon, 250,000 winter Chinook salmon, and 600,000 steelhead annually. Winter Chinook salmon are reared at the Livingston Stone National Fish Hatchery, a sub-station of Coleman NFH, located at the base of Shasta Dam.

Coleman NFH was constructed in 1942 as a mitigation measure to preserve Chinook salmon populations following construction of Shasta Dam. Shasta Dam permanently blocked approximately 50% of key spawning and rearing habitat(s) for Chinook salmon and steelhead (Skinner 1958). The Shasta Salvage Plan authorized the construction and operation of a fish hatchery (Moffett 1949; Black 1999) to offset natural production losses. Fish production began at Coleman NFH in 1943. Production objectives for Coleman NFH include two runs of salmon and steelhead. The facility goal(s) are to ensure contribution from upper Sacramento River salmonid populations to commercial (ocean) and sport fisheries (ocean and river). Coleman NFH contributes substantially to the multimillion-dollar commercial and recreational fishing industry in California.

Three intake structures and associated conveyance facilities are used to divert and convey water directly from Battle Creek and the Coleman Powerhouse tailrace (Figure 1). The primary intake (1) is located within the tailrace of Pacific Gas and Electric’s (PG&E) Coleman Powerhouse, on the north bank (Figure 2). Intake water is transferred through a 46 in (1,200 mm) conveyance pipe and diverted into Coleman Canal. The secondary intake (2) is located on the south bank of Battle Creek (across from intake 1). Intake 2 shares the conveyance pipe with intake 1 and diverts water to Coleman Canal. Intake 2 serves as an emergency back-up water diversion structure for intake 1, supplying water to Coleman Canal 17 days annually (10-year average 1990–2000). Intake 1 and 2 are approximately 1.6 miles (2.6 km) upstream of Coleman NFH. Intake 3 is 1.2 miles (1.9 km) upstream from Coleman NFH and acts as the tertiary diversion for the hatchery. Water is diverted 4,600 feet (1,400 m) from Intake 3 to the hatchery through 48 in (1,200 mm) pipe. Water from all intakes may be diverted to the ozone facility or sent directly to hatchery rearing units at Coleman NFH
