= Virginia Schau =

American photographer

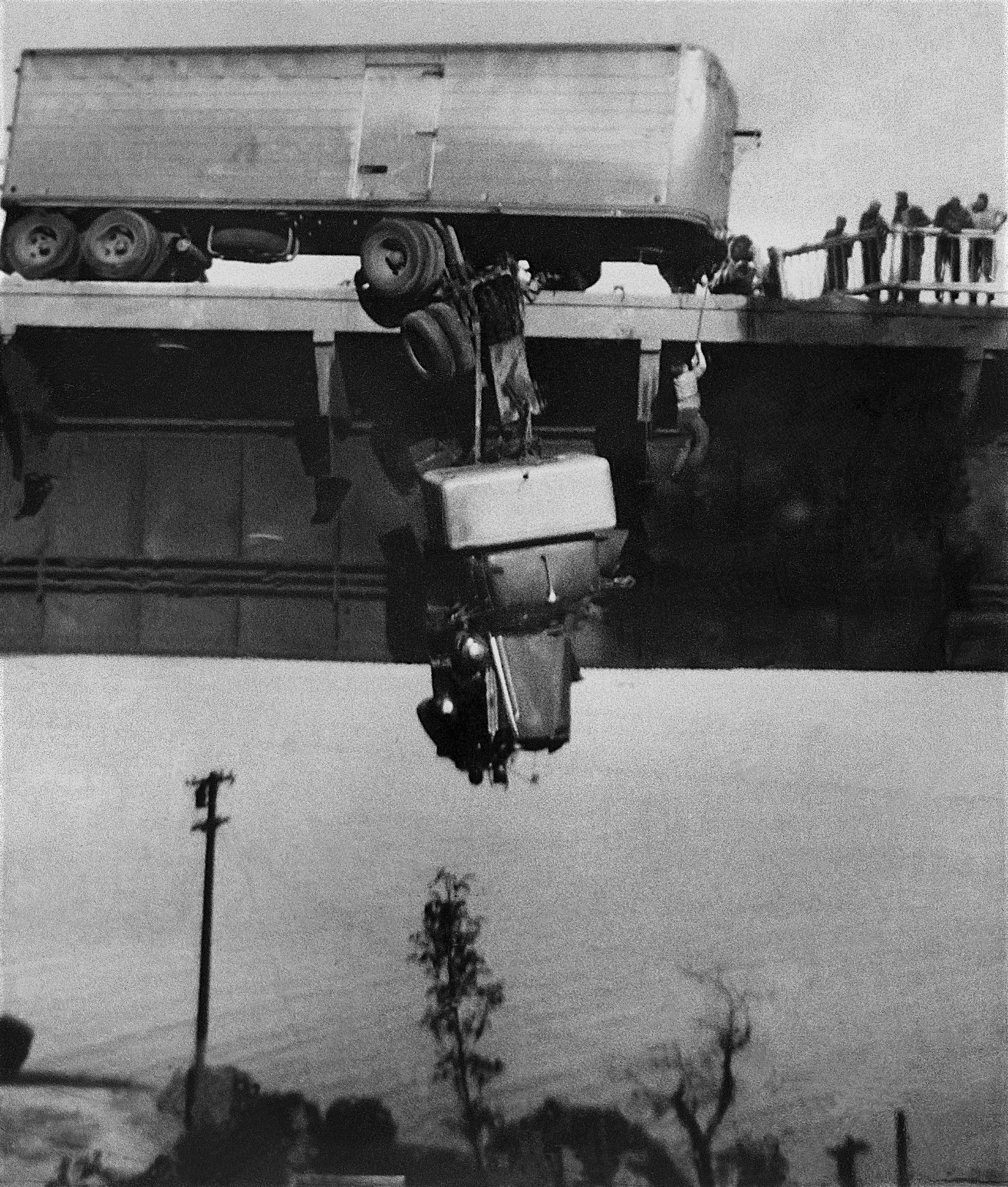
"Rescue on Pit River Bridge", Schau's Pulitzer Prize-winning photograph

Virginia Margaret (Brown) Schau (February 23, 1915 – May 28, 1989) was an American who was the first woman and second amateur to win the Pulitzer Prize for Photography, which she was awarded in 1954. The award-winning photograph was taken in Redding, California, at the Pit River Bridge and was titled "Rescue on Pit River Bridge". The photograph was taken with a Kodak Brownie camera.

== Early life ==
Virginia Margaret Brown was born in Sacramento, California, one of the two daughters of Henry R. and Mable L. (Masters) Brown; Mr. Brown ran a grocery in Sacramento. Virginia graduated from Sacramento High School in 1933 and then attended college at the University of the Pacific in Stockton, California, receiving a Bachelor of Music in 1937 and a Bachelor of Arts in 1941. She was also a member of the national music sorority Mu Phi Epsilon.

At the outbreak of World War II, Virginia Brown worked to support the war effort and by mid-1942 was the acting head of the Mail and Records Division of the U.S. Chemical Warfare Service for the San Francisco Procurement District. On April 19, 1942, Virginia married First Lieutenant Gilbert Burton Doolittle, U. S. Army at the Presidio in San Francisco, California. Promoted to captain, Gilbert Doolittle would be killed on February 1, 1945, in the Battle of Luzon as the Allies fought to retake the Philippines. Captain Doolittle's remains would be returned to the United States and in 1948 would be buried at Arlington National Cemetery. On May 22, 1949, in San Joaquin County, California, Virginia Doolittle married Army veteran Walter Miller Schau, a "cost accountant" for the Standard Oil Company in San Francisco and moved to the town of San Anselmo, California.

== "Rescue On Pit River Bridge" ==
On May 3, 1953, at the opening of the fishing season along the upper Sacramento River, Walter and Virginia Schau decided to take her parents, Mr. and Mrs. Brown, out for a day of fishing. Virginia Schau brought along a Brownie camera that her sister had given to her some years back, although she said later: "I'm the kind of person who always takes a camera on a trip and never takes a picture." This had been the first time she had picked up the camera in over a year, the previous Mother's Day, and there were still two exposures left on the roll.

The Schaus and the Browns were driving on a two-lane road approaching the Pit River Bridge north of the town of Redding, California, behind a semitrailer from Portland, Oregon, carrying fruits and vegetables. As the truck started over the bridge, the truck driver, Paul M. Overby, and his helper, Henry Baum, both of Portland, soon determined that something was wrong with the steering mechanism, but before they could stop, the steering failed. Overby lost control of the truck, which smashed through the bridge's steel railing.

The cab, with Overby and Baum trapped inside, was hanging off the bridge, 40 feet above the Sacramento River. The rear wheels of the cab were jammed between the side of the bridge and the trailer, which had miraculously remained on the bridge. Walter Schau, and the driver behind him, J. D. McLaren of Concord, California, stopped traffic, found a length of rope and with the help of other motorists, attempted to rescue Overby and Baum from the dangling cab. While Schau, McLaren and the others were working to save the lives of the truckers, Virginia Schau went to her car and got the camera and "ran out to a knoll on the right which was directly opposite to where the cab of the truck dangled in the air."

Walter Schau, hanging by his ankles, was able to lower the rope to Overby, who grabbed on to it and was pulled up by Schau, McLaren and others. Baum was still in the cab, semi-conscious, and when the cab caught fire, Walter Schau had to climb down and pull Baum out, before the cab, fully ablaze, fell into the Sacramento River. While the rescue operations were going on, Virginia Schau, from her vantage point, was able to get off two pictures, using the last two exposures in her camera. Schau's father reminded his daughter of the Sacramento Bee's weekly photo contest. She submitted the photograph, won the contest—and ten dollars—and the photograph was picked up by the Associated Press and distributed globally. Almost a year to the day later, Virginia Schau was "flabbergasted" to hear that her picture of the rescue had won the 1954 Pulitzer Prize for Photography. Virginia Schau received a $1,000 cash award as the prize as well as being paid by other news outlets for the use of the photographs.

== See also ==
- Arnold Hardy - First amateur to win the Pulitzer Prize for Photography
