= In the Light of Reverence =

2001 film by Christopher McLeod

- Narrated by: Peter Coyote
- Distributed by: Bullfrog Films, Native American Public Telecommunications
- Release date: 2001
- Running time: 73 minutes
- Country: United States
- Language: English

In the Light of Reverence (2001) is a documentary produced by Christopher McLeod and Malinda Maynor (Yumbee). It features three tribal nations, Hopi, the Winnemem Wintu, and the Lakota Sioux, and their struggles to protect three sacred sites. Such sites are central to their understanding of the world and their spiritual responsibilities to care for their homelands.

The three stories featured in In the Light of Reverence are intended to lead to understanding and dialogue. They were developed with an advisory board composed of Native Americans and were based on personal relationships nurtured for decades.

The three sacred sites, Devils Tower, situated in the Lakota Black Hills; the Four Corners of the Hopi in Arizona; and the Winnemem Wintu's Mount Shasta, are places of extraordinary beauty. They have been sites of controversy over differing ideas of how to use the land among American Indians and non-Indians. The Lakota, Hopi, and Winnemem Wintu consider the land sacred. Users such as mining companies, New Age practitioners, and rock climbers think of the land as a material resource best used for industry and recreation.

== Background ==
In 1978, the United States Congress passed the American Indian Religious Freedom Act (AIRFA) which legalized Native American worship practices which had been banned for over a century. While Native Americans tried to use the Act to protect sacred places where they pray, in every instance they lost. In 1988, the Supreme Court overturned two lower court rulings that sided with northern California Indians who were trying to prevent a logging road from going through their sacred "high country" in the Siskiyou Mountains, east of Eureka. It is a place of vision questing and medicine gathering. The Forest Service sought to build a road, or "G-O Road" to gain access to old growth timber.

The loss of the GO Road case sparked a crisis in Indian country, as it appeared that the laws did not protect their sacred sites. The principle of religious freedom could not be extended to protect the sites they needed for worship. In the early 1990s, Native Americans assessed the AIRFA court battles and concluded that the non-Native public had virtually no understanding of what such sacred places meant to Indian communities, why they were important, and how their protection was fundamental to the free exercise of their religions. They chose to develop means of public education.

The conflict over climbing at Devils Tower, Wyoming, escalated into a legal battle in 1997 when Mountain States Legal Foundation and several commercial climbers sued the National Park Service for asking climbers and tourists to respect Native American beliefs about the tower. Christopher McLeod, who had already been filming with the Hopi and Winnemem for five years, decided to add the Devils Tower story "to round out the film geographically, and to include the legal conflict over climbing a sacred site - because ultimately America is a nation of laws, and many value conflicts ultimately are worked out through legal arguments." The producers contrasted the treatment of Native American places with those important to European Americans: "the fundamental irony of the denial of religious freedom to the first Americans is mirrored in the fact that it is a federal crime to climb the faces of Mount Rushmore." In total, he and Maynor worked on the film for ten years.

In the Light of Reverence is narrated by the Bay Area actor, Peter Coyote, and Tantoo Cardinal of the Métis people. It premiered in San Francisco on February 17, 2001, at the Palace of Fine Arts.

The film received the Best Documentary Feature Award at the American Indian Film Festival in San Francisco, was nationally broadcast on PBS as part of the POV series, on August 14, 2001, and was seen by three million people. In 2005, the Council on Foundations awarded the film the prestigious Henry Hampton Award for Excellence in Film and Digital Media, in recognition of the film's influence, its positive reception in Indian Country and its strong distribution history.

In the Light of Reverence features interviews with Vine Deloria, Jr. of the Standing Rock Sioux, Florence Jones of the Winnemem Wintu, and Charles Wilkinson.
