= Pit River Bridge =

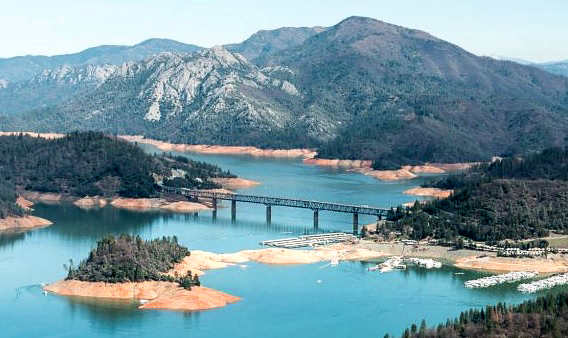
- Coordinates: 40.762337°N 122.318886°W
- Carries: I-5 and Union Pacific Railroad (former Southern Pacific line)
- Crosses: Shasta Lake
- Locale: Shasta County, California
- Official name: Veterans of Foreign Wars Memorial Bridge

Characteristics
- Design: Warren deck truss
- Total length: 3,588 feet (1,094 m)
- Height: 500 feet (150 m)
- Longest span: 630 feet (190 m)
- No. of spans: 8
- Piers in water: 7

History
- Opened: 1942

Location
- Interactive map of Pit River Bridge

The Pit River Bridge (officially the Veterans of Foreign Wars Memorial Bridge) is a double deck, deck truss, road and rail bridge over Shasta Lake in Shasta County, California. The bridge, carrying Interstate 5 on its upper deck and Union Pacific Railroad on its lower deck, was built in 1942 as part of the construction of the Shasta Dam/Shasta Lake reservoir system. The Pit River Bridge was constructed to replace the Lower Pit River Bridge, as the rising waters of the Shasta Lake reservoir would have put the older bridge underwater. The entire bridge spans 3,588 feet (1,094 m) long on the upper deck and 2,754 feet (839 m) on the lower deck. With a height of 500 feet (150 m) above the old Pit River bed, it is structurally the highest double decked bridge in the United States; however, today the bridge sits only about 40 feet (12 m) above the water when Shasta Lake is full.

At the time it was built, the highway on the bridge was signed as U.S. Route 99 and the rail line was owned by Southern Pacific. The Coast Starlight, the passenger train line operated by Amtrak that runs between Los Angeles and Seattle, also uses the bridge.

The bridge is officially known as the Veterans of Foreign Wars Memorial Bridge, to honor military veterans from California who have fought in foreign wars.

The Pit River Bridge was the subject of the 1954 Pulitzer Prize for Photography winner entitled "Rescue on Pit River Bridge", taken by Virginia Schau.

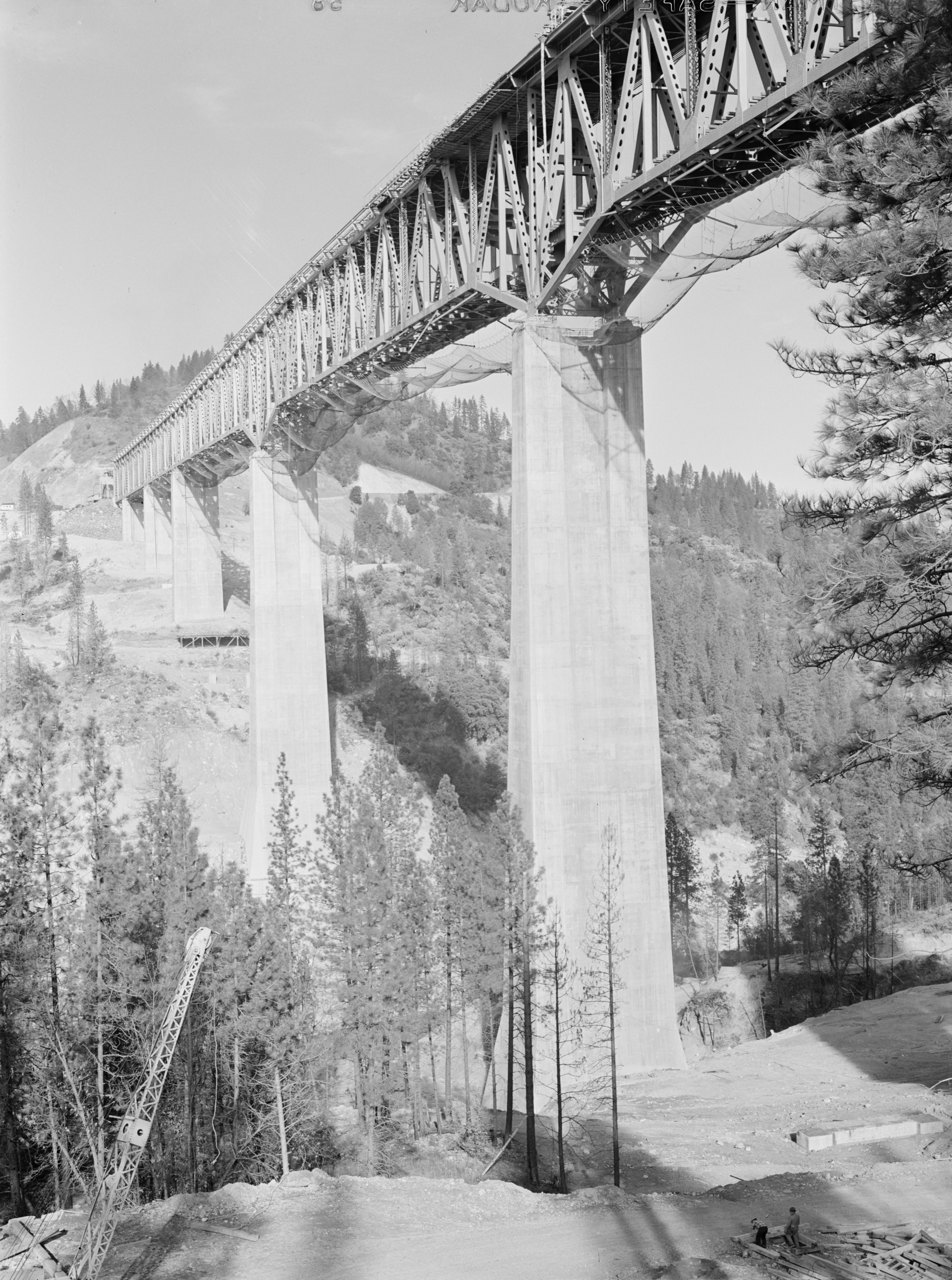
Pit River Bridge

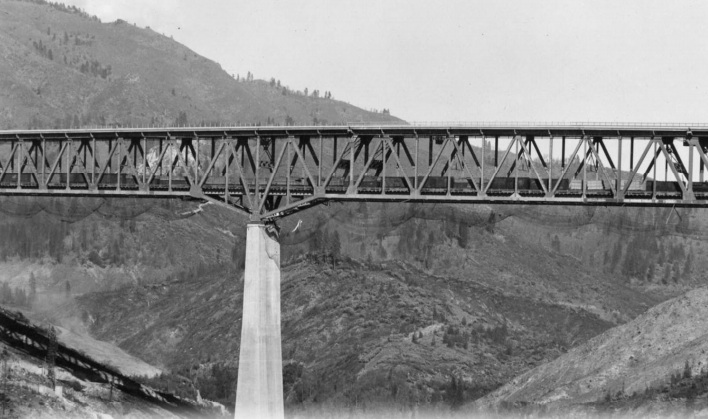
Pit River Bridge before its pylons were inundated by Shasta Lake

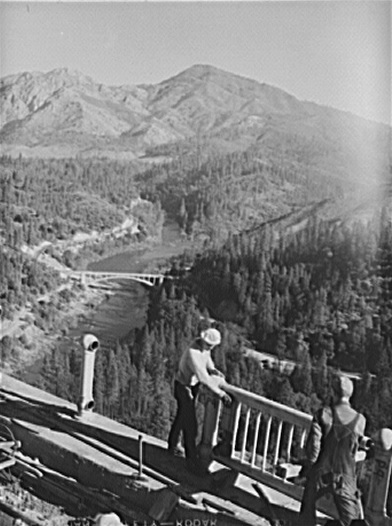
Construction work on Pit River bridge

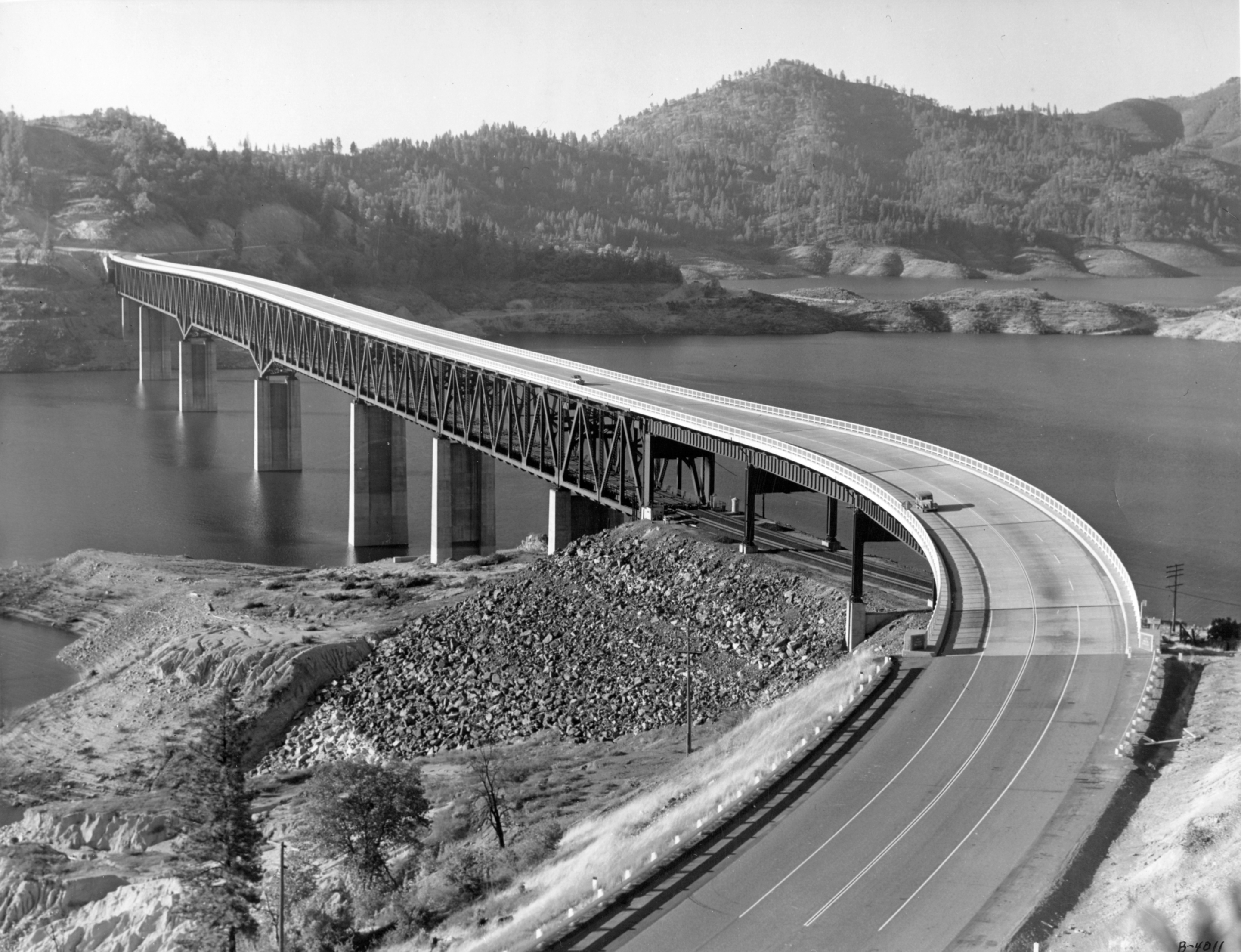
Circa 1942

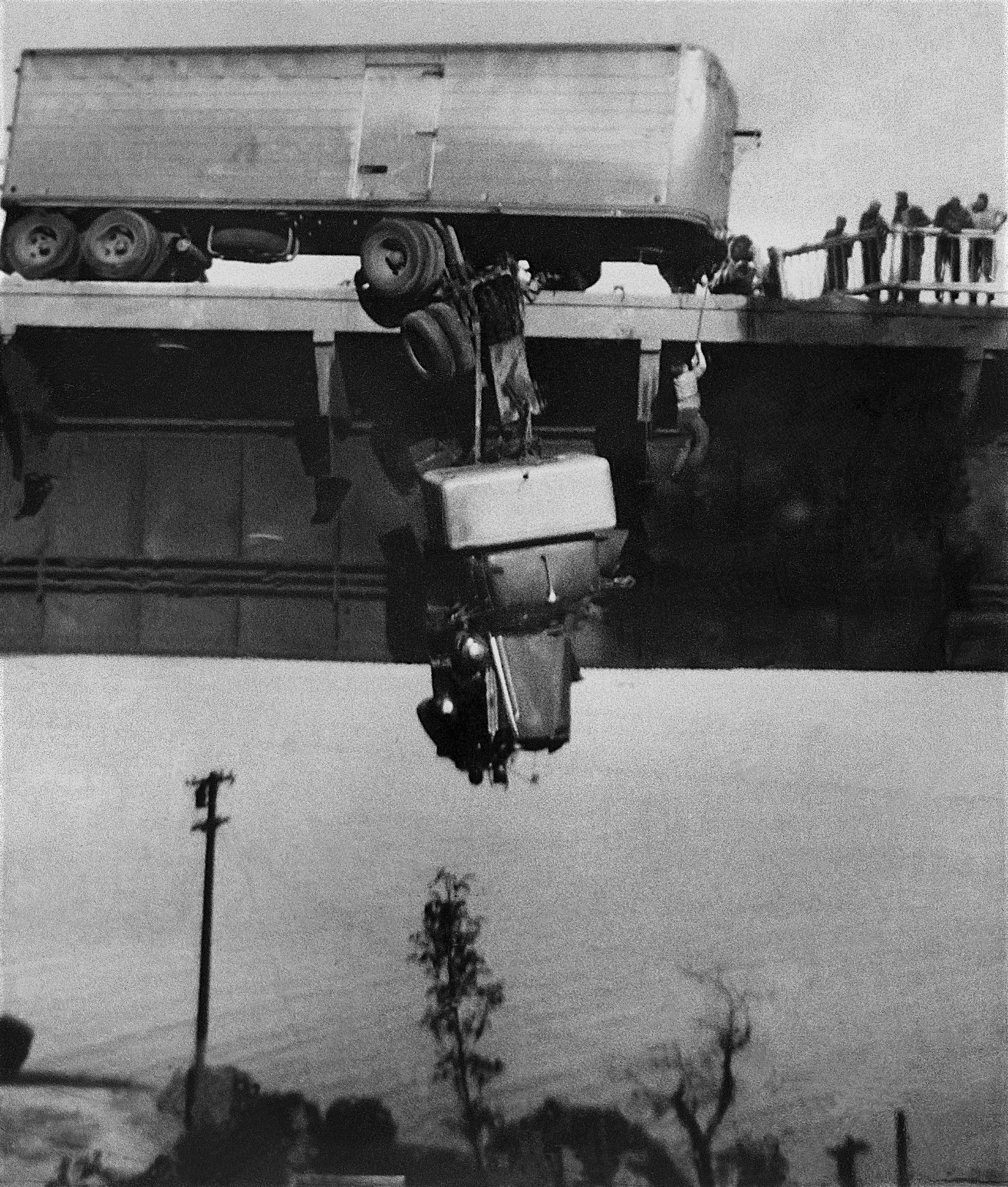
"Rescue on Pit River Bridge"
