= Restore the Delta =

Campaign in California

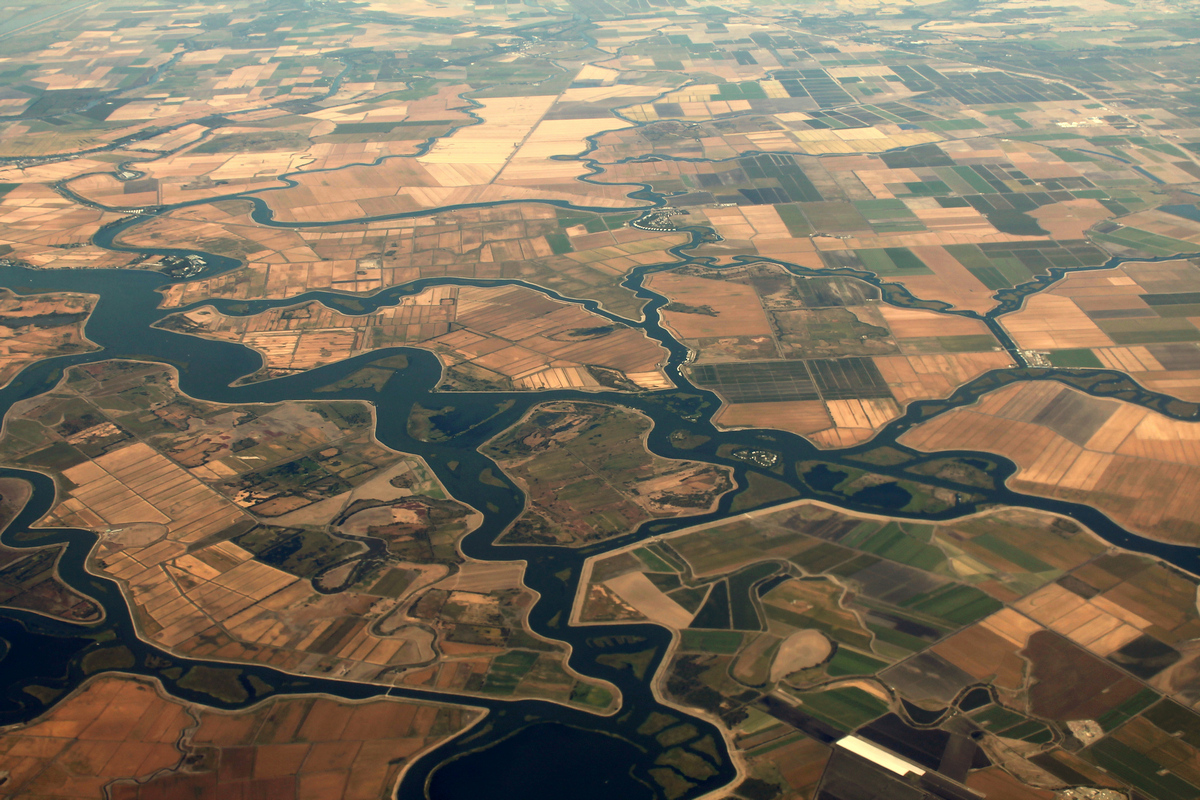
A bird's eye view of the California Delta

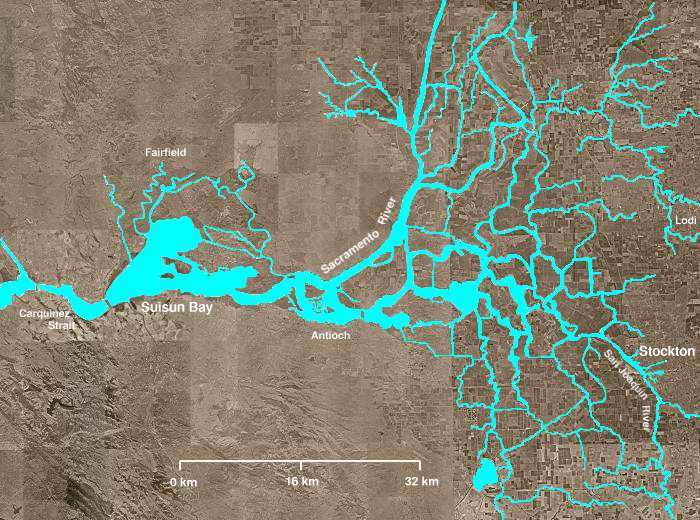
USGS map of the Sacramento - San Joaquin River Delta

Restore the Delta is a campaign, based in Stockton, California that advocates for restoring the Sacramento-San Joaquin Delta also known as the San Francisco Bay-Delta Estuary. It began in 2006 working towards education and outreach to help Californians recognize the Delta as part of California's heritage. Currently, there are up to 40,000 members throughout California of both residents and various organizations working towards the same goal.

== About the delta ==
The Sacramento-San Joaquin Delta is made up of the North flowing San-Joaquin river and the South flowing Sacramento river that come together in the central valley. It is one of the most unique and largest estuary on the Pacific Coast of the United States. These waters support, fisheries, migrating waterfowl, 500,000 acres of farm land, a community of over 4 million people and many other ecosystems.

== Mission ==
Restore the Delta strives to save the Sacramento-San Joaquin Delta for current and future generations. They want the waters of the Delta to be swimmable, fishable, drinkable, and farmable. To achieve this, they advocate for local stakeholders to directly impact water management and sustainability decisions in order to benefit Californians and their communities.

Restore the Delta believes in "regional self-reliance" to ensure a sustainable future of clean water supply. Their main stance is with increased use of local water management strategies, rather than regional infrastructure for transportation.

== Local delta issues ==
Restore the Delta provides research based educational resources on the evolving state of the San Francisco Delta-Bay Estuary on items such as Water Quality, Environmental Justice Initiatives, and algae bloom reports such as this one.

=== Water quality and harmful algal blooms ===
Harmful algal blooms (HABs) are an issue in the San Francisco Bay-Delta Estuary. There are 6 conditions that cause these blooms to occur, nutrient loads from discharge, warm water, still water, bright sunlight, glyphosates, and reduced freshwater flows. In order to bring awareness they have created a fact sheet and a youtube video, outlining details about how HABs can affect water quality and what can be done to help.

=== Salinity ===
Salinity intrusion from the ocean water flowing inland through the Delta is a concern that will change the wildlife and usability of the water. According to the new Environmental Impact Report, the Delta Tunnels project will cause a 26-60% increase in salinity throughout the Suisun Marsh. Other levels of concern affecting water quality are that of selenium, methyl mercury, arsenic, and group A pesticides.

=== Abandoned vessels ===
Abandoned vessels can be a large issue for water ways for both navigational and environmental purposes. These vessels can cause pollutants through oil, antifreeze, fuel and other toxic materials. They destroy habitats for marine life and cause harm to drinking water.

=== Other Items of Focus ===
Restore the Delta also brings awareness to a number of other issues, including flood control, illegal dumping, homeless encampments on waterways and California wildfires.

== Articles, Records, and Resources ==
Restore the Delta releases frequent articles that cover relevant water news and politics. The site's archive dates back to October 24, 2013.

California Sustainable Water Plan- A counter proposal to the 2014 California Water Action Plan (the $17 billion Delta Tunnels Project) Summary guide of the California Sustainable Water Plan,

Restore the Delta highlights the 2009 Delta Reform Act as the protecting policy of the Delta. They claim that the State Water Resources Control Board is responsible to operate and create policies with the Delta communities in mind, emphasized within The Fate Of The Delta: Impacts of Proposed Water Projects and Plans on Delta Environmental Justice Communities

=== Resources for Community Action ===
Restore the delta has vast resources on their website to help people engage with the policy makers who decide the fate of the Delta's waters.

-This is a concise and comprehensive handout covering the policy and potential impacts of the Delta Tunnels Project.

-Here is a list of important and controversial questions and issues that raise concern about with the Delta Tunnels Project.

=== Funding and Collaborations with other Organizations ===
Founded in 2006, Restore the Delta has been an operating campaign through fiscals sponsorship of Friends of the River, until 2010, when Restore the Delta became their own 501c3. They now receive donations through grassroots organizing with more than 15,000 supporters. Donors include Delta landowners, farmers, and other organizations such as fishing groups, and foundations.

==== CAL EPA ====
The CalEPA has partnered with Restore the Delta developing the Stockton Environmental Justice Initiative along with other local collaborators Little Manila Rising, Fathers and Families of San Joaquin, the Pride Center for San Joaquin County, Faith In the Valley, Third City Coalition, Community Medical Centers, El Concilio, Catholic Charities, Delta-Sierra Chapter of the Sierra Club, and Bye Bye Mattress.

==== Climate Water Advocates ====
The Irvine Foundation and Mosaic Momentum located in Stockton, CA are two organizations that are funding student led efforts in collaboration with Restore the Delta. Around a dozen local college students are working on the issues of climate and water issues in California through this program.

=== Community Letter to Newsom ===
In 2019, a letter was written to Governor Gavin Newsom addressing suggestions to The Water Portfolio, a statewide management strategy for the water of California. Dozens of organizations signed this letter in support of the suggestions. Representatives from these organizations include but are not limited to Audubon California, Environmental Justice Coalition for Water, Pacific Coast Federation of Fisherman's Associations, San Francisco Baykeeper, South Yuba River Citizens League, Natural Resources Defense Council, California Sportfishing Protection Alliance, Friends of the River, Restore the Delta, Sierra Club California, The Bay Institute, The Nature Conservancy, Tuolumne River Trust, Winnemem Wintu Tribe, and Wishtoyo Chumash Foundation.

== Stockton Environmental Justice Initiative ==
Restore the Delta along with a number of other partners worked with Cal EPA to develop the Stockton Justice Initiative. Through their collective efforts, they were able to determine a number of issues in their community including, illegal dumping, air pollution near schools, and odorous and discolored drinking water. One of the main community efforts Restore the Delta is supporting is Illegal Dumping- Mattress Recycling.

- Delta Tunnels- The California Water Fix and Eco Restore proposed the building of two large tunnels that would carry water from the Sacramento River under the Sacramento-San Joaquin Delta and towards the State Water Project and Central Valley Project. For 12 years, Restore the Delta fought against this development due to the numerous issues it could cause. The impacts included the displacement of hundred of wildlife and plant species, negative impacts on fisheries, recreation and tourism in the San Francisco Bay and the Delta, damages to the agricultural economy and on water quality. With this development water salinity, HABs, group A pesticides, methyl mercury, and selenium would all increase into dangerous levels. Thankfully, when Gov. Gavin Newsom took office in January 2019, he got rid of the plans for the twin tunnels. Gov. Newsom introduced the "California Water Resilience Portfolio" and requires agencies to "conduct extensive outreach to inform this process". This prompted the introduction of Restore the Delta's Climate Equity and Seismic Resilience for the San Francisco Bay-Delta Estuary.

=== Climate equity and seismic resilience for the San Francisco Bay-Delta Estuary ===
Climate Equity and Seismic Resilience for the San Francisco Bay-Delta Estuary

This report found that Delta levees are an important aspect and are currently not in a great condition. The levees offer the protection needed to help with increased flooding from climate change to protect the residents in the communities, which often struggle to recover from flooding. Due to an increase in permafrost thawing, peat soil fires, and extreme loss of ice sheets in Antarctica and Greenland, sea level rise continues to be an issue. Other climate change issues include, extreme flood events, reduced runoff, higher water temperatures, reduced freshwater flows and reduced amounts of water.

- After determining their findings, recommendations were made to help improve the Delta. These included:
- Understanding that the San Francisco Bay-Delta Estuary is a single entity and any policies made must cover the entire Estuary.
- Any projects under the portfolio should be "no regrets" in regard to actions and investments that protects lives and property while also considering regional water self-sufficiency.
- Before a tunnel is constructed, any regional projects should already be determined. One modeling begins, sea level rise, storm surge, and flood flows should be taken into account with regard to both the North Delta intakes and South Delta pumps.
- The modeling should also include a variety of tunnel operational scenarios in regard to different levels of water quality and diminished amount of river inflow.
- The current levees should be upgraded to ensure they meet seismic, flood and sea level stressors whether or not a tunnel is implemented.
- Integrating the state environmental justice policy with current flood protection planning and using creative and cost effective methods.
- Flood flows captured by nature and/or artificial recharge methods could be beneficial to increase ground water supplies.

=== Documentary ===
In October 2012, Restore the Delta released a short documentary titled "Over Troubled Waters" about the Sacramento-San Joaquin Delta. It was directed by Russel Fisher and Jason Sturgis. It was produced by Barbara Barrigan-Parilla and written by Jane Wagner Tyack. The film was narrated by Ed Begley Jr. and is around 45 minutes long. This documentary explores the different policies and decisions that have led to the problems that the Sacramento-San Joaquin Delta faces today. It shows where it began with the state and federal water projects, which promoted industrial agriculture, at the expense of habitats, farming, fisheries and communities in both the Delta region and Northern California. It goes through interviews with both farmers and fishermen whose lives have been changed for the worse. Other interviews include, people who maintain the levees, people who recreate in the delta, and people who know the significance of the fish within the ecosystem. Throughout the documentary, it refutes claims made by those of higher power (wealth and political) that attempt to justify causing California taxpayers and water ratepayers almost $20 billion. The film ends with ideas on how Californians can move away from the reliance on the Delta and still gain more water security. The documentary can be found here.
