= Battle Creek Fault Zone =

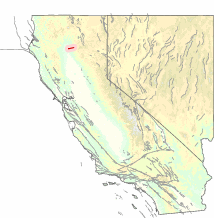
The Battle Creek Fault Zone in northern California, United States

The Battle Creek Fault Zone is a system of closely parallel faults that run between the Coast Ranges near the town of Cottonwood to the west, extending northeast about 22 miles toward the southern slopes of Mt. Lassen. The faulting action is normal (vertical motion) with terrain to the south lower than terrain to the north. Although there have been no earthquakes in historic times, it is believed that the fault zone may still be active, and has been determined to be the closest active and possibly hazardous fault to the Shasta Dam.

The fault zone is unusual in comparison to all other faults in Northern California due to its nearly east–west alignment.
