= Christopher McLeod =

Christopher (Toby) McLeod is the project director of Earth Island Institute's Sacred Land Film Project, which he founded in 1984 as one of Earth Island's original projects. From 2006 to 2013 he produced and directed the four-part documentary film series Standing on Sacred Ground, which premiered in 2013 at the Mill Valley Film Festival and aired nationally on PBS in 2015. Standing on Sacred Ground features eight indigenous communities around the world fighting to protect their sacred places. The award-winning series visits Altaians in Russia, the Winnemem Wintu in northern California, the Ramu River in Papua New Guinea, the tar sands of Canada, the Gamo Highlands of Ethiopia, the Andes of Peru, Australia's Northern Territory and the island of Kaho`olawe in Hawai`i. McLeod produced and directed the award-winning documentary In the Light of Reverence (2001), which aired on the PBS series P.O.V., and he's made three other award-winning documentary films: The Four Corners: A National Sacrifice Area? (1983) with Glenn Switkes and Randy Hayes, Downwind/Downstream (1988) with Robert Lewis, and NOVA: Poison in the Rockies (1990). His first film was the 9-minute short The Cracking of Glen Canyon Damn—with Edward Abbey and Earth First! (1982) with Glenn Switkes and Randy Hayes. McLeod is the host of the Sacred Land Speaks podcast. McLeod studied history at Yale and then attended U.C. Berkeley's Graduate School of Journalism, where his master's thesis film Four Corners won a Student Academy Award in 1983. He received a Guggenheim Fellowship for filmmaking in 1985. With Robert Wild, McLeod co-edited the IUCN (International Union for the Conservation of Nature) best practice handbook: Sacred Natural Sites—Guidelines for Protected Area Managers(2008). The focus of these educational projects has been to increase public awareness and understanding of sacred natural sites, indigenous peoples' cultural practices and worldviews, and environmental justice.
