= Kabyai Creek massacre =

1854 massacre against Wintu indigenous people

Coordinates: 40°56′2″N 122°15′0″W

The Kabyai Creek massacre or Kaibai Creek massacre (August 17, 1854) was a massacre against the Winnemem Wintu people, a part of the bigger series of events known as the California Indian Wars, in which mass violence, militia sponsored campaigns, and massacres occurred. For the Kabyai Creek massacre, a party of white settlers attacked a Winnemem Wintu village at Kabyai Creek, on the McCloud River. 42 Winnemem Wintu men, women, and children were killed.

== Significance and current issues ==
The site of the village is on the McCloud River at the mouth of Kabyai Creek across the river from the McCloud Bridge Campground in the Shasta–Trinity National Forest, in Shasta County, California. The village site is among those of the Winnemem Wintu being threatened with being submerged by Shasta Lake because of a currently approved expansion of the Shasta Dam.

Many of the historical Winnemem Wintu villages were located along the McCloud River, more specifically around 84 out of the 239 validated sites. The cultural ties to the region are significant, and with invasions, massacres, and environmental damage, these people continue to fight for what little culturally and spiritually important sites they have left which is even harder since the people themselves are currently still not recognized by the federal government.

As of March 2026 the proposed and approved expansion of the Shasta Dam is posing a threat that will overwhelm or completely damage remaining gathering places for the Winnmemem Wintu people as well as flooding the Kabyai Creek burial ground, where the victims of the massacre were buried. This current $40 million dollar expansion will raise the dam by over 18 feet, it has been heavily debated for years but ultimately approved by the Trump administration. Its initial construction already flooded 90% of the ancestral territory of the Winnemem Wintu people but this current raise which again will flood what little cultural and spiritual sites they have left including the Kabyai Creek burial grounds which holds a deep historical connection to its people.
