= Winnemem Wintu =

Band of the Wintu people of California, US

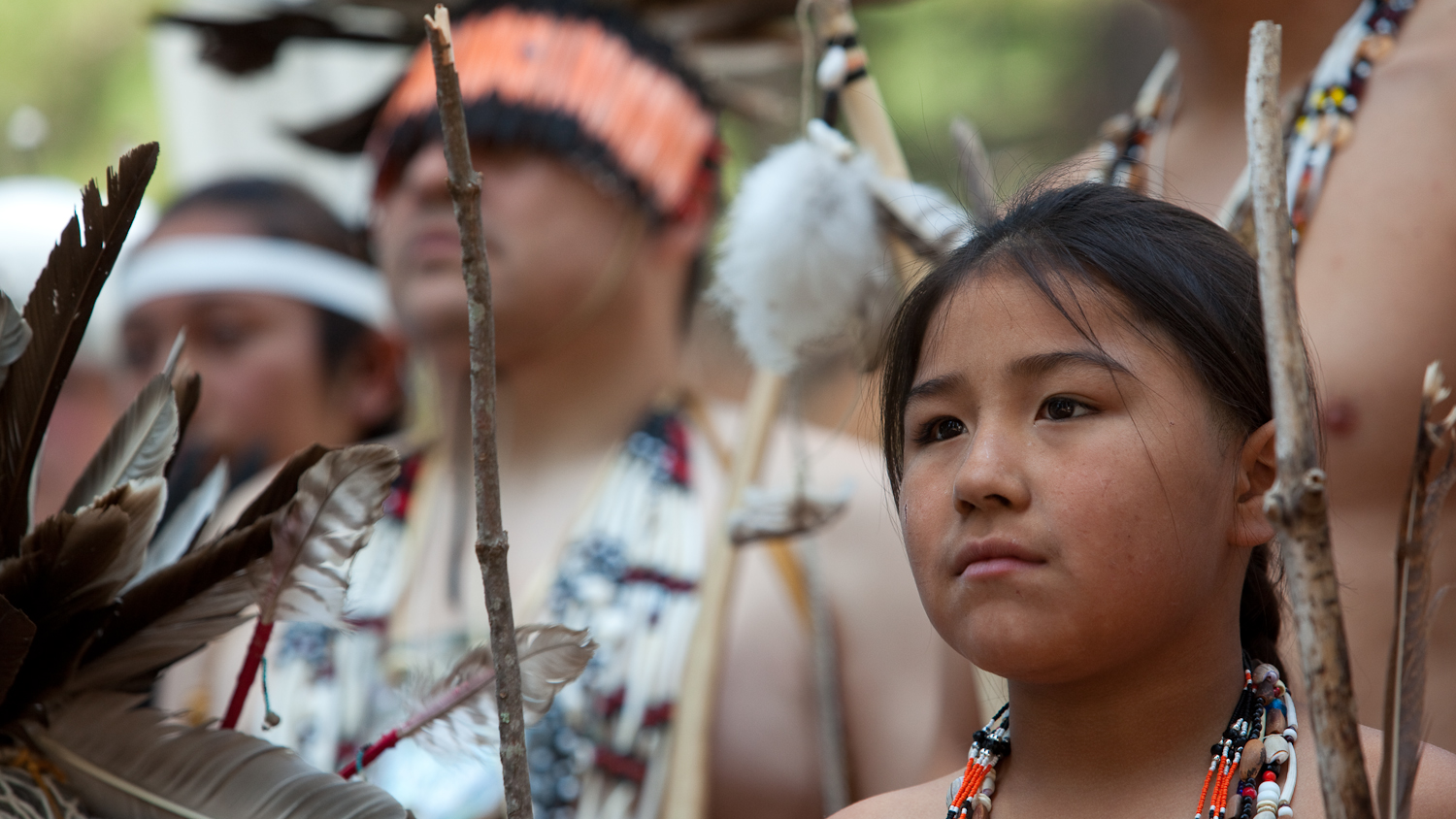
Winnemem Wintu dancers

The Winnemem Wintu ("middle river people" or "middle water people") are a Native American band of the Wintu tribe originally located along the lower McCloud River, above Shasta Dam near Redding, California.

== History ==
Forty-two Winnemem men, women and children were killed by white settlers at Kabyai Creek, on the McCloud River, in 1854. This action is known as the Kaibai Creek Massacre.

Around the late 19th century and early 20th century, local militias were awarded $5 for proof of every Native American person killed.

Since 1945, portions of the lower McCloud River have been flooded by Shasta Lake, the reservoir created by the Shasta Dam. In 1971, a group of Winnemem Wintu occupied Toyon-Wintu Center, a government-owned property where housing had been built for dam construction workers. They were granted a temporary permit to remain at the site in 1973, but the government moved to evict the thirty remaining Wintu residents in 1988, completing the eviction in 1989.

The Winnemem Wintu have been in a protracted fight with the State of California and the federal Bureau of Reclamation over the proposed raising of the height of Shasta Dam to secure more water for California cities and agriculture. The Winnemem Wintu argue that the proposed higher lake level would flood many Winnemem Wintu sacred sites. From September 12 to 16, 2004, one faction of Winnemem Wintu held a "war dance" as a protest. They claim it was the first war dance held since 1887.

The Winnemem Wintu claim important sacred sites on Mount Shasta and Cold Spring Mountain. They are one of several groups of Native Americans who feel that casinos and their proceeds destroy culture from the inside out and refuse to participate in the gaming industry.

The Winnemem healer Florence Jones (Puilulimet) (1907–2003) was portrayed in a nationally broadcast PBS documentary, In the Light of Reverence, in 2001, as she successfully led her community's fight to stop construction of a new ski resort on sacred Mount Shasta.

== Language ==
The Winnemem Wintu traditionally spoke the North Eastern Dialect of the Northern Wintun Language, a member of the Wintuan languages, and a member of the larger Penutian language "stock". Chief Caleen Sisk has been working with linguist Stefan Liedtke and the Indigenous Language Institute on the revitalization of the Winnemem Wintu language.

== Federal recognition ==
The Winnemem are one of what anthropologists have hypothesized to be nine total bands of Wintu. They are not a federally recognized tribe, although they are working toward federal recognition. The Winnemem Wintu are divided politically into several groups, with members participating in at least three organized groups attempting to obtain federal recognition. In addition, there are several Winnemem Wintu descendants who decline to participate in these groups for various reasons.

Some Winnemem Wintu feel that the Bureau of Indian Affairs (BIA) does not recognize them because of government error rather than termination. BIA officials have informed some Wintu representatives of Winnemem heritage that "Bureaucratic Oversight" resulted in the entire Wintu being omitted from the list of federally recognized tribes as early as the 1940s.

One Winnemem Wintu group argues that they were accidentally erased from the Bureau of Indian Affairs list of recognized tribes during the 1980s. They have not been able to regain this recognition. Legislation sponsored by Senator Ben Nighthorse Campbell in 2004 gave these Winnemem Wintu the opportunity to regain recognition. However, the Winnemem Wintu were informed that the group's inclusion on an omnibus bill related to all Native American tribal people would have put the entire bill at risk. Rather than have other tribal people put at risk, the Winnemem Wintu agreed with Senator Campbell to remove their name from the bill.

As of 2021, they were still fighting to be federally recognized.
