= Battle Creek (California) =

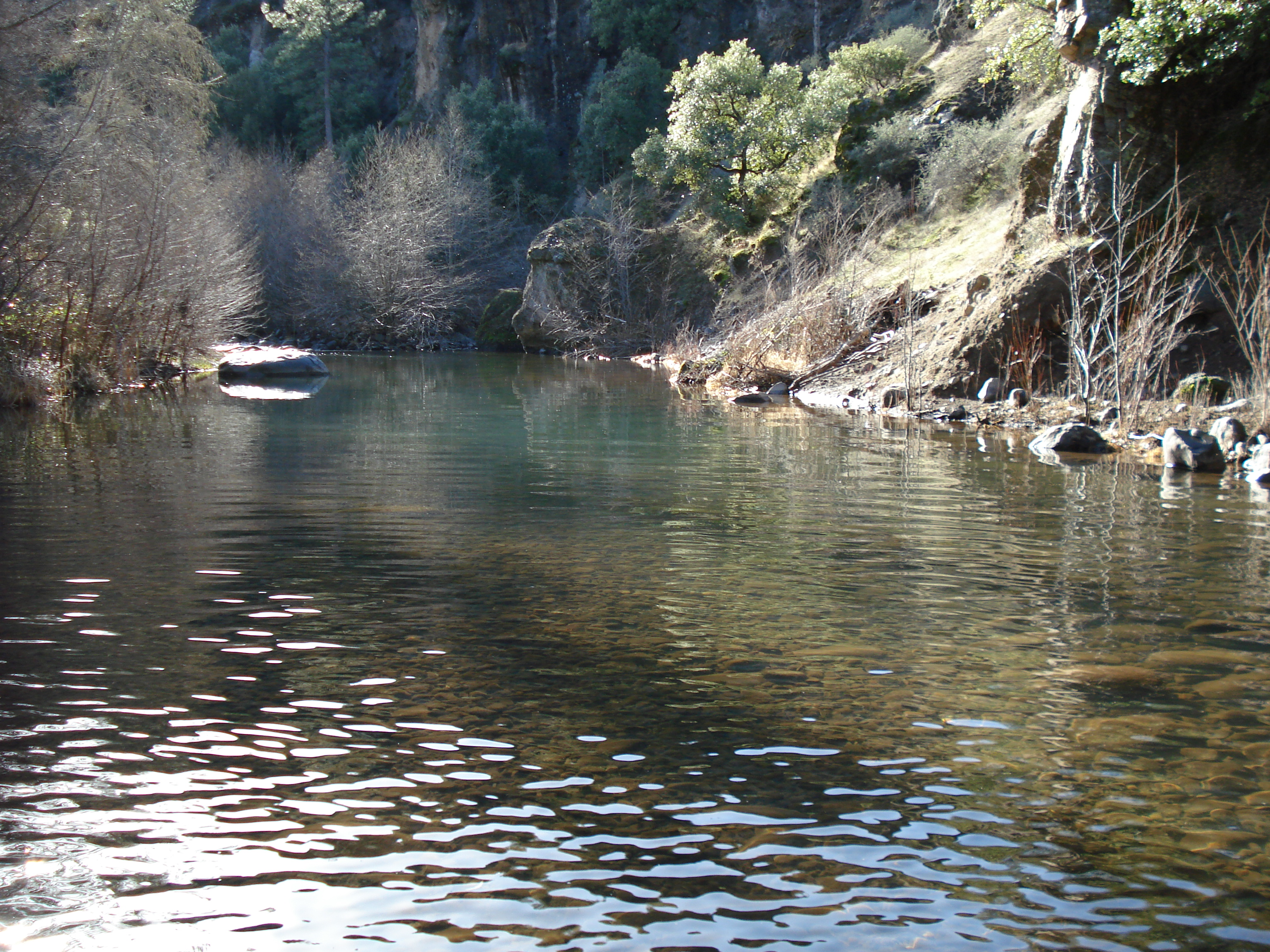
- Battle Creek in January 2007

- Location of the mouth in California

Location
- Country: United States
- State: California

Physical characteristics
- Source: Confluence of North Fork and South Fork
  - location: Near Manton, California
  - coordinates: 40°25′23″N 121°59′49″W
  - elevation: 868 ft (265 m)
- Mouth: Sacramento River
  - location: Southeast of Anderson
  - coordinates: 40°21′19″N 122°10′33″W
  - elevation: 338 ft (103 m)
- Length: 47 mi (76 km)
- Basin size: 365 sq mi (950 km^{2})
- Discharge
  - location: USGS gage #11376550, 5.7 miles (9.2 km) from the mouth
  - average: 501 cu ft/s (14.2 m^{3}/s)
  - minimum: 102 cu ft/s (2.9 m^{3}/s)
  - maximum: 24,700 cu ft/s (700 m^{3}/s)

Basin features
- Tributaries
  - left: South Fork Battle Creek, Spring Branch Battle Creek
  - right: North Fork Battle Creek

Battle Creek is a 16.6-mile-long (26.7 km) creek located in Shasta and Tehama counties, California. It is a major tributary to the Sacramento River.

The eastern side of the Battle Creek watershed falls within the northernmost part of the Sierra Nevada mountain range, as it transitions into the southern Cascade Range. The undisturbed part of the watershed is richly diverse in both plant and animal species. The tributaries of Battle Creek originate from dozens of underground springs.

The creek is part of a $67 million Chinook salmon restoration project, a PG&E Battle Creek Hydroelectric Project. Many adjacent properties hold conservation easements protecting them from development.

In addition to the Chinook salmon, the creek has steelhead, rainbow, and brown trout. Counterintuitively, first-year data from a post-wildfire soil erosion study funded by Sierra Pacific Industries, a large industrial timber company, show that control sites disturbed only by fire produced substantially more water runoff and soil erosion than did sites that received post-wildfire salvage logging. However, given this document was written by an employee of the large timber company which has extensively salvage logged the watershed, the results are questionable. Reviews of the document prepared by two hydrologists on behalf of Battle Creek Alliance, a local environmental group, argued that it contained substantial flaws.

The industrial timberland in the Battle Creek watershed is upstream of the restoration project. The clearcutting and post-fire salvage logging which has been occurring since 1998 is the subject of the documentary film "Clearcut Nation", produced by Battle Creek Alliance. A Citizen's Water Monitoring Project has been collecting water quality data both upstream and downstream of the industrial timberland since 2009. This data was analyzed by a statistical hydrologist in 2014.

Battle Creek was named in commemoration of an 1849 battle between Indians and early white trappers.

Gallery
South fork of Battle Creek in June 2016 downstream of industrial timberland after one inch of rain

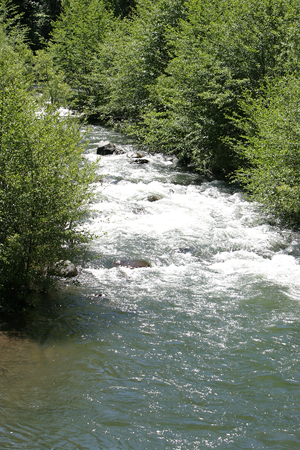
Battle Creek in March 2010
