= Humboldt Military District =

During the American Civil War, Army reorganization created the Department of the Pacific on January 15, 1861. On December 12, 1861, the District of Humboldt was created, consisting of the counties of Sonoma, Napa, Mendocino, Trinity, Humboldt, Klamath, and Del Norte in Northern California. The district was headquartered at Fort Humboldt, located on a bluff above the central portion of Humboldt Bay south of Eureka, California, which is now a California State Historic Park located within the City of Eureka. The District's efforts were directed at prosecuting the ongoing Bald Hills War against the Indians in the northern, coastal area of the large district. A peace was achieved in August 1864.

On July 27, 1865, the Military Division of the Pacific was created, consisting of the Department of California and Department of the Columbia. Humboldt District was absorbed by the Department of California.

== Commanders ==
- Colonel Francis J. Lippitt, January 9, 1862 - July 13, 1863.
- Lieutenant Colonel Stephen G. Whipple, July 13, 1863 - February, 1864
- Colonel Henry M. Black February 8, 1864 - June 1864
- Lieutenant Colonel Stephen G. Whipple, June 1864 - July 27, 1865.

== Posts of the Humboldt Military District ==
Name	Date	Notes & Citations
Fort Humboldt	1853–1867	
Fort Bragg	1857–1864	
Fort Ter-Waw	1857–1862	
Camp on Janes Farm	1858–1862	later Camp Curtis
Camp Curtis	1862–1865	formerly Camp on Janes Farm
Camp at Pardee's Ranch	1858–1865	
Fort Gaston	1859–1892	
Fort Seward	1861–1862	
Fort Wright	1862–1875	
Camp Anderson	1862, 1864	
Fort Baker	1862–1863	Located 23 miles (37 km) east of Hydesville on the Van Duzen River at the confluence with the Eel River. Replaced by Fort Iaqua.
Camp Liscom Hill	1862	
Daley's Ferry Post	1862	
Elk Camp	1862	
Camp Lincoln	1862–1869	
Camp Lippett	1862	
Fort Lyon	1862	
Camp Redwood	1862	
Reed's Ranch Post	1862, 1864	
Camp Olney	1862	
Camp Grant	1863–1865	
Fort Iaqua	1863–1866	
Gold Bluffs Post	1863–1864	near Orick.
Trinidad Camp	1863	
Camp Gilmore	1863–1864	Located four miles north of Trinidad to protect the mail route.
Camp at the Forks of the Salmon	1864	
Camp at Martin's Ferry	1864	
Camp Boynton Prairie	1864	
Camp Burnt Ranch	1864	
Camp Mattole	1864	
