= 2nd California Infantry Regiment =

2nd California Volunteer Infantry
- National color of the regiment
- Active: September 2, 1861, to July 2, 1866
- Country: United States
- Allegiance: Union
- Branch: Infantry

The 2nd Regiment California Volunteer Infantry was an infantry regiment in the Union Army during the American Civil War. It spent its entire term of service in the western United States. Organized at San Francisco and Carson City September 2, 1861, to December 30, 1862, and attached to Department of the Pacific. The regiment was first assembled at the Presidio, San Francisco, and after completing its organization, five companies were sent to Oregon and Washington Territory, to relieve the regular troops, and two companies were sent to Santa Barbara. The troops of this regiment sent to Oregon were afterwards returned to California.

On the expiration of the enlistments of many of the original members of the regiment in October, 1864, the regiment was reorganized with a mix of remaining veterans and new recruits. The Regiment was ordered to Arizona Territory, August 15, 1865, by the order of the Department of California. It was posted at Camp on San Pedro River from October 1865 to December 31, 1865 (later renamed Camp Grant, Arizona), until it was recalled to be mustered out at San Francisco, April 16. Company H was the last unit of the Regiment to be mustered out July 2, 1866.

== Commanders ==
- Colonel Francis J. Lippitt, October 1861 – October 1864
- Colonel Thomas F. Wright, October 1864 – July 2, 1866

== Flag ==
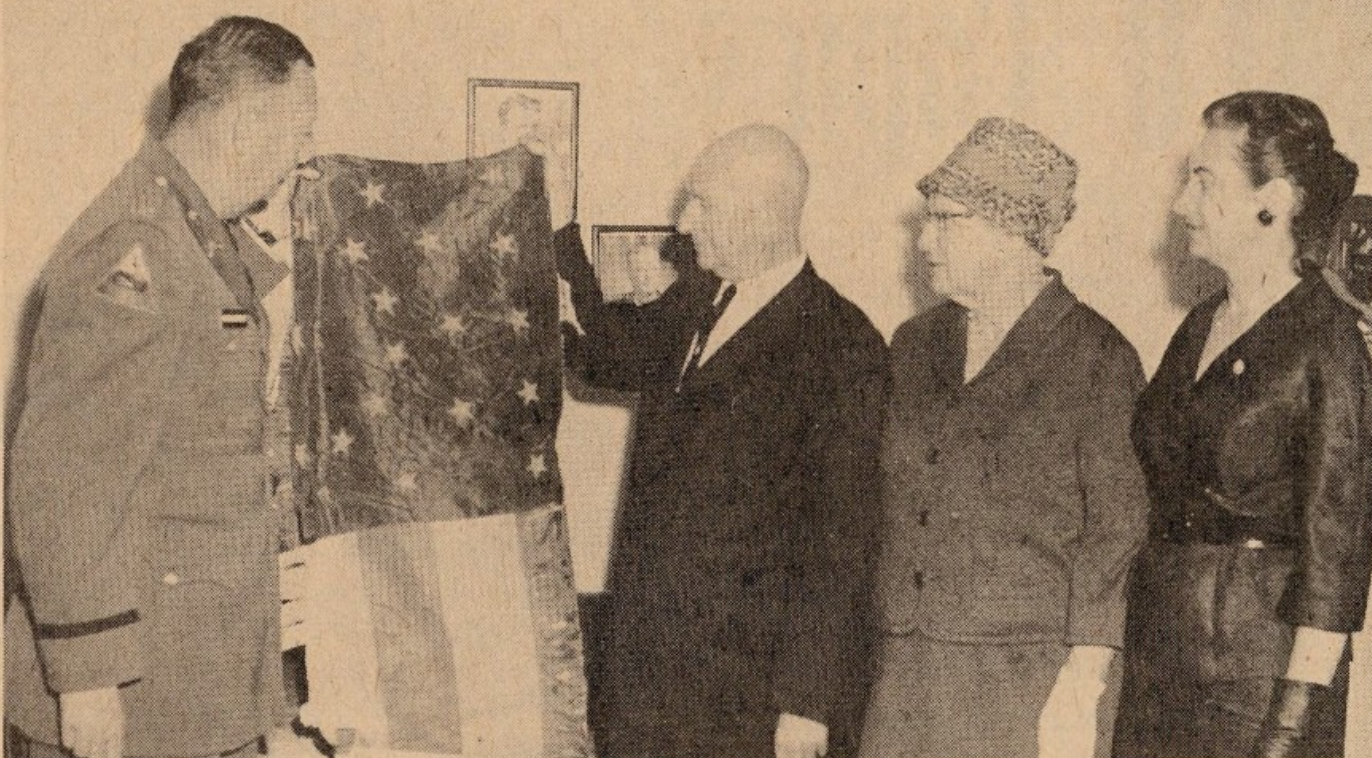
The flag photographed in 1963

The flag was given to the regiment by D. Norcross in San Francisco. It was an American flag with 37 white star surrounding a golden one in center representing the California, on the top stripe was the inscription "2d Infantry Cal. Vols." and 3 stripes below it was the motto "Defend the Flag." On May 10, 1866 Colonel Thomas F. Wright gave the flag to Society of California Volunteers. In 1886, members of the Society carried the flag in a Grand Army of the Republic parade in San Francisco. The flag later fell into the hands of John Calder Innes of Company I. In 1963, John's grand-daughter and daughter-law presented the flag to a local Grand Army of the Republic chapter in San Francisco.

== Company assignments ==
- Headquarters: Were stationed from date of organization to January 1, 1862, at Camp Sumner, when they moved to the Presidio Barracks, and remained until January 7, 1862, when they embarked for Fort Humboldt, California. Landed at Post Lippitt on January 9, 1862, they marched next day to Fort Humboldt, headquarters of the Humboldt Military District. Regimental Headquarters transferred to Benicia Barracks, July 20, 1863, and from there to Fort Miller, Fresno County, California, August 11, 1863, where they were stationed until October 1, 1864. They returned to the Presidio, October 9, 1864. Ordered to Arizona, August 15, 1865, by the Department of California. It was posted at Camp on San Pedro River from October 1865 to December 31, 1865 (later renamed Camp Grant, Arizona), until it was recalled to be mustered out at San Francisco, April 16.
- Company A Mustered in at San Francisco October 11, 1861. Company ordered to District of Oregon October 17, 1861. November 30, 1861, at Fort Dalles, Oregon., until March 30, 1862. At Fort Vancouver until May 4, 1862. May 30, 1862, moved to the Humboldt Military District and stationed at Fort Baker, Fort Humboldt, Camp Lyon and Camp Wright June 30, 1862, until June, 1863.
  - Skirmishes at Eel River, March 21 and 24, 1863.

Ordered to Benicia Barracks June 27, 1863, then to Old Fort Miller August 11, and duty there until September, 1864. At Presidio of San Francisco until muster out October, 1864. Reformed at the Presidio, and duty there until August 1865 when they were ordered to Arizona Territory via steamship to a camp near Drum Barracks, August 31, then en route to Arizona Territory via Fort Yuma to Fort Goodwin, on October 31, 1866, and duty there until April 30, 1866. Then returned to the Presidio, to be mustered out May 31, 1866.

- Company B Was mustered into the service September 5, 1861, marched to the Camp Lyon training camp, from there to Camp Sumner near the Presidio, in San Francisco. Company ordered to District of Oregon October 17, 1861. At Fort Hoskins from October 30, 1861, until March, 1862. At Fort Dalles until June, 1862. Ordered to Fort Vancouver June 27. Left Fort Vancouver July 26, 1862, and arrived at Alcatraz Island July 31, then left there August 3, 1862, for Fort Humboldt, arrived on August 7. While moving their baggage, a cannon accidentally went off an killed Private Charles Emerson. They then moved on to Camp Curtis on the 9th.
  - Company B was engaged in a scout after hostile Indians through the Klamath County and Humboldt County August 15–22, 1862.
  - A detachment of the company, under Lieutenant Campbell, was engaged August 22–25, 1862. A detachment under Lieutenant Watson joined from Fort Umpqua, Oregon, on August 24, 1862.

On September 17, 1862, the company left Camp Curtis, and via Fort Humboldt, arrived at Benicia Barracks June 15, 1863, and duty there until August 12, 1863. Company B left for Fort Miller, Fresno County, arriving August 22, 1863, and duty there until it left for Fort Tejon, via Visalia, California, arriving on January 14, 1864. Duty there until September 11, 1864, marched to Drum Barracks, remaining until October 6, 1864, when the steamer "Senator," carried them to the Presidio, on October 8, 1864, and duty there until muster out. Reformed at the Presidio, and duty there until the company left April 17, 1865, for Harrison-Street depot, San Francisco, where they remained until May 25, 1865. Ordered to Arizona Territory on August 15, 1865. Left Presidio Barracks, August 19, 1865, on steamer "Senator" arriving at Wilmington, California August 21, 1865, en route to Arizona they camped at Drum Barracks, Fort Yuma, arriving at Camp on San Pedro River, in October, 1865. Moved to Fort Grant in December, 1865. Moved to Camp on San Pedro River, January 31. 1866, to Fort Grant, February 28, then to Camp at Fort Yuma, March 31, 1866, Camp at Drum Barracks, April 30, 1866, then moved to Presidio, San Francisco, and mustered out May 10, 1866.

- Company C Mustered into service September 6, 1861, at Camp Lyon, Hunter's Point, marched to Camp Sumner near the Presidio, September 28, 1861. Company ordered to District of Oregon October 17, 1861. Embarked on steamer "Pacific" for Fort Vancouver, arrived October 31, steamed up to Walla Walla and marched to Fort Colville, arriving at November 17, 1861. Duty at Fort Colville, Washington Territory, until July 12, 1862. Moved to Alcatraz Island, California, then on board steamer " Panama" to Fort Humboldt, where then company arrived August 8, 1862. Arrived at Camp Baker, Humboldt County, August 13, 1862. From Camp Baker, September 6, to Camp Lincoln, via Fort Humboldt, arriving September 15, 1862, and duty there until October 17, 1864. Ordered to San Francisco and returning on steamer "Panama" arrived October 20, 1864. Duty at the Presidio until muster out. Reformed at the Presidio, and duty there until the company was ordered to Arizona Territory by the Department of California, on August 15, 1865. Left San Francisco, August 26, 1865, at San Pedro August 28, in camp near Drum Barracks, August 31, 1865; at Fort Yuma, September 30. In Camp on San Pedro River, during the months of October and November, then at Fort Grant, December 31, 1865. In camp on San Pedro River, January 31, 1866; again at Fort Grant, February 28, 1866. Mustered out of service at the Presidio, San Francisco, May 10, 1866.
- Company D Began enlistment at Petaluma, California, September 2, 1861, and mustered on September 14, 1861. Company ordered to District of Oregon October 17, 1861, arriving at Fort Colville, Washington Territory, and duty there until July 12, 1862. Ordered to Humboldt District, California,(via Fort Dalles, Vancouver, and Alcatraz Island). Embarked for Fort Bragg, August 5, 1862, arrived August 7, 1862, while moving their baggage a canon accidentally went off killing a Private. They stayed at Fort Bragg until December, 1863.
  - Expedition to Keytesville, April 12–24, 1863.
  - Scout to the Eel River, May 3–21, 1863, Captain Hull, with twenty men, attacked a party of hostile Indians in that neighborhood, numbering thirty-five or forty, killing four, wounding three, and bringing away their women and one boy, captives, to the Indian reservation. Returned to Fort Bragg May 21.
  - Scout to Shelter Cove and Mattole River, August 3–23, 1863, Captain Hull, with nineteen men, proceeded to the neighborhood of Shelter Cove and Mattole River, on a scout, and returned August 23, 1863, not having seen any hostile Indians.
  - Scout to the Mad River September 15 - October 2, 1863, Captain Hull, with nineteen men from Fort Bragg on a scout for Indians to the Mad River.
  - January 20, 1864. Scout for Indians to Eel River country Captain Hull, with twenty-four men, left on a scout for Indians in Eel River country.
  - February 1 to June 30, 1864. Operations in Humboldt District.
    - March 1, 1864. Headquarters of Company D was removed to the field, leaving sufficient force to protect Fort Bragg.
    - March 17, 1864. Skirmish at Red Mountain, near Blue Rock Station.
    - March 19, 1864. Skirmish at Eel River.
    - March 22, 1864. Skirmish at Bald Spring Canyon.
    - March 27, 1864. Skirmish on Eel River.
    - April 1 to May 20, 1864. Scouting for hostile Indians: Killed in engagements, 33; Indians taken prisoners, 181 (men, women, and children); surrendered themselves, 102(men, women, and children). During the first part of the scout, 125 were sent to Camp Grant, to be forwarded from there to the Humboldt Reservation, in order not to embarrass the movements of the company.
      - April 28, 1864. Skirmish on Big Bend, Eel River.
      - May 9, 1864. Skirmish on Shelter Cove.
  - May 27 to July 20, 1864. Captain Hull, with eighteen men, escorted the remaining 158 prisoners to Fort Humboldt, where he arrived May 27, turning the prisoners over to its commander. Returning on May 30, he arrived at Fort Bragg July 20, 1864.

Company ordered to San Francisco, leaving Fort Bragg September 30, awaiting transportation at Mendocino until October 17, and arrived at the Presidio, October 20, 1864, and duty there until mustered out. Reformed at the Presidio, and duty there until August, 1865, when the company was ordered to return to Humboldt County, and was stationed at Fort Gaston, August 31 to November 30, 1865, and Fort Humboldt, from December 31, 1865 - March 31, 1866. Mustered out at the Presidio, San Francisco, April 16, 1866.

- Company E Company E was organized by Captain Eugene B. Gibbs, at San Francisco, in September, 1861. Company ordered to District of Oregon October 17, 1861, arriving at Fort Vancouver October 21, 1861, and duty there until May 4, 1862. To Fort Humboldt via Alcatraz Island arriving May 16, 1862, and duty there until September, 1862.
  - May 14, 1862. Skirmish at Mad River.
  - June 6–7, 1862. Skirmish at Daley's Farm, Mad River, near Arcata.
  - June 7, 1862. Skirmish at Mattole Valley.
  - June 8, 1862. Skirmish at Fawn Prairie, near Liscombe Hill.

Left for Camp Curtis arrived September 17, 1862, and stationed there until May 11, 1863. Left for Benicia Barracks; arrived there May 14, 1863, and stationed at that post until December 14, 1863. Left Benicia Barracks for Camp Curtis, and arrived December 17, 1863, remained at that post until October 1, 1864. Company left for Presidio, San Francisco, and arrived there October 4, 1864, for muster out. Reformed at the Presidio, and duty there until August, 1865, when the company was ordered to Arizona Territory, on August 15, 1865. Left San Francisco arriving at San Pedro August 31, at Fort Yuma, September 30. In Camp on San Pedro River, October 31, then at Fort Grant, December 31, 1865 - February 28, 1866. Mustered out of service at the Presidio, San Francisco, May 10, 1866.

- Company F, Was organized by Captain C. D. Douglas at Carson City, Nevada, in the September, 1861, and marched to San Francisco, arriving October 1, 1861. At San Francisco until December, 1861. Ordered to Fort Humboldt. at Camp Lippitt, Fort Wright and Fort Anderson, January - August, 1862. Moved to Fort Gaston and duty there September - November 1862, returning to Fort Wright in December, 1862, remaining at that station until ordered to San Francisco June, 1865.
  - Attack on Alber's Ranch, January 29, 1862.
  - Attack on Crogan's Ranch, May 7, 1862.
  - Attack on Whitney's Ranch, July 28, 1862.
  - Skirmish at Redwood, September 8, 1862.
  - Operations in Humboldt District, March 10 - July 10, 1863.
    - Expedition from Camp Wright to Williams Valley, April 7–11, 1863.
    - Skirmish, Williams Valley, April 9, 1863.
  - Operations in Humboldt District, February 1-June 30, 1864.

San Francisco muster out June, 1865. Reformed June, 1865, and duty at the Presidio, San Francisco, until final muster out, May 4, 1866.

- Company G Company G was organized November 29, 1861. It left the Presidio of San Francisco for duty on Alcatraz Island December 20, 1861, leaving on March 8, 1862, for Crescent City, California, arriving March 11, marching to Fort Ter-Waw it arrived at April 1, 1862, where it was stationed till June 9, 1862. Left for Camp Lincoln, where it arrived June 11, 1862.
  - Detachments of the company were frequently sent scouting against hostile Indians while stationed in the Humboldt Military District, from March, 1862, to June, 1863.

June 11, 1863, the company left for Benicia, on the steamer "Panama," arriving June 16, 1863. Left Benicia August 12, and arrived at Camp Babbitt August 28, 1863, and duty there until January 9, 1864. Arrived at Fort Tejon January 15, 1864, and duty there until June 4, 1864. Arrived at Drum Barracks June 9, 1864, left Drum Barracks June 18, 1864, and arrived at Fort Yuma July 1, 1864. After a short stay it left for Drum Barracks arriving October 21, 1864, left on the steamer "Senator", October 26, 1864, for the Presidio of San Francisco, arriving October 29, 1864, and was mustered out. Reformed in November 1864 and duty at the Presidio, until ordered to Arizona Territory, August 15, 1865. Left Presidio Barracks August 19, on steamer "Senator" arriving at Drum Barracks August 21, 1865. En route to Arizona Territory, at Drum Barracks, August 31, near Fort Yuma, September 30, arrived at Camp on San Pedro River, October 31, 1865. At Fort Grant, December 31, 1865 - March, 1866. Recalled to Presidio, San Francisco, the company was mustered out May 10, 1866.

- Company H Was mustered on October 21, 1861, at San Francisco. Embarked for Santa Barbara, California, December 28, 1861, arriving January 2, 1862, and duty there until April 12, 1862. Arrived at Fort Alcatraz, April 14, 1862, and duty there until April 19, 1862. Arrived at Eureka, Humboldt County April 21, 1862, en route to Fort Gaston, arrived April 30, 1862, and duty there until August 18. Left for Fort Humboldt arrived August 22, 1862, and duty there until May 11, 1863. Arrived at Benicia Barracks, May 14, 1863, and duty there until it left for Fort Gaston via San Francisco and arrived there December 22, 1863, and duty there until September 16, 1864. Marched from Fort Gaston, to Fort Humboldt, and arrived October 1, 1864. Left for San Francisco October 2, 1864; arrived at San Francisco October 4, 1864, and duty there until mustered out. Reformed at Presidio Barracks October 1864. Stationed at Harrison Street Depot, San Francisco, until May 25, 1865; at Presidio, till ordered to Arizona Territory, August 15, 1865. Left Presidio Barracks August 19, 1865, on steamer "Senator;" arrived at Drum Barracks, Cal., August 21, 1865, en route to Arizona Territory near Drum Barracks, August 31, Fort Yuma, September 30, arriving at Fort Goodwin, October 31, 1865. Duty there until April 30, 1866. The company was mustered out of the United States service at the Presidio, San Francisco, July 2, 1866.
- Company I, At Santa Barbara until April, 1862. Moved to San Francisco, thence to Fort Humboldt and to Fort Gaston April 20, 1862. Duty there until June; 1863.
  - August 6, 1862. Skirmish at Fort Gaston
  - August 23, 1862. Affair at Little River

At Fort Humboldt and in Humboldt District until December, 1864. At Presidio, San Francisco, until muster out. Reformed at the Presidio, and duty there until the company was ordered to Arizona Territory by the Department of California, on August 15, 1865, arriving in October to Camp on San Pedro River until moving to Fort Grant, December 31, 1865, to March, 1866. Ordered to San Francisco and was mustered out at the Presidio, May 10, 1866.

- Company K, Ordered to Fort Humboldt December, 1861, thence to Fort Lyon and Fort Gaston, and duty there until June, 1863.
  - July 2, 1862. Action at Weaversville Crossing, Mad River.
  - April 30, 1863. Action at Near Oak Camp.
  - September 21, 1862. Skirmish at Yreka Road, near Fort Crook, (Detachment).
  - October 21, 1862. Skirmish at Simmons' Ranch, near Hydesville, (Detachment).
  - November 3–29, 1862. Scout from Fort Crook to Honey Lake Valley (Detachment).

Moved to Benicia Barracks June, 1863, then to Chico, California, August 11. At Fort Miller until December, 1864, then to Benicia Barracks, until mustered out. Reformed at the Presidio, and duty there until the company was ordered to Arizona Territory by the Department of California, on August 15, 1865. August 19, 1865, left on steamer "Senator"; arrived at Drum Barracks, August 21; en route to Arizona Territory at Drum Barracks, August 31, Fort Yuma, September 30, Fort Goodwin, on October 31, 1865, and duty there until April 30, 1866. Ordered to San Francisco and was mustered out June 30, 1866.

== See also ==
- List of California Civil War Union units
- Camp Grant, Arizona (formerly Fort Breckinridge, Arizona)
