= Daley's Ferry Post =

Coordinates: 40.9009°N 124.0303°W

Daley's Ferry Post was located at Daley's Ferry crossing of the Mad River nearly three miles from the town of Arcata in Humboldt County. On June 6, 1862 the ferry had been attacked by Native Americans:

Headquarters Humboldt Military District,

Fort Humboldt, June 8, 1862.

Major: I have the honor to report that on the 6th instant, at 4 p. m., the house or hotel at Daley's Ferry, on Mad River, about five miles from Arcata, and on the most constantly traveled trail, was attacked by a band of Indians, some fifty or sixty in number, all well armed with rifles and shotguns. There were but two soldiers stationed there, as the owner deemed it hardly necessary to have any guard so near to town, and on a public highway. The Indians opened the attack by a volley from the brush. Private Bacon was wounded in the groin at the first fire, but he and his comrade, Private Wyatt, rushed to the house and commenced firing from the windows. Daley also ran to the house, but leaving his family behind, he seized his rifle and fled to his boat in the river. Our soldiers, thus left alone, directed the women and children to endeavor to reach the boat, and they would remain and keep the Indians at bay. The family were successful in making good their escape to the boat, when our men, keeping up their fire, retired slowly, both being now wounded and faint from the loss of blood. Wyatt only was able to reach the boat. Bacon concealed himself behind a log in the brush, and from that position saw and counted twenty-seven Indians who entered the house, pillaged and set it on fire. The party in the boat were immediately fired upon by about twenty Indians on the opposite bank. An old lady (mrs. Dausken), mother of Mrs. Daley, was struck by three balls and killed. Mrs. Daley was wounded in the arm, and Private Wyatt was again wounded, and in the arm under the shoulder, the ball grazing his breast, he being in the act of firing. His first wound was in the groin, and similar to that of Bacon. They were then forced to put back to the shore, escaping into the brush. Mrs. Daley struggling along with two children at last fell from exhaustion, upon which her husband cowardly abandoned her, throwing his infant that was in his arms into the bushes and making for Arcata. Some Indians came up to Mrs. Daley, robbed her of her rings and purse, and said they would not "kill white squaw. " The brave woman made another effort and walked some distance; then taking off off some of her clothing wrapped it around the two eldest (two and three years old), hid them in the bushes and kept on, carrying her infant in her arms, one of which was torn open from the elbow to the wrist by a rifle bullet. She was rescued at last by people from Arcata who came out for the purpose, and who by her directions found the children calmly sleeping at about 2 a. m. Our wounded men were also found, and are now in the hospital at this post, their wounds, though severe, not proving dangerous. I hired man is missing and supposed to be killed, and the Indians carried off a nephew of Mrs. Daley, about five years old. I beg leave most respectfully to bring to the notice of the general commanding Private Joseph N. Bacon, Company I, and Private Henry H. Wyatt, Company H, Second Infantry California Volunteers, for admirable coolness and bravery under the most trying circumstances. I omitted to mention that the soldiers finding themselves disabled put their arms out of the reach of the Indians, one hiding his musket in the brush the other throwing his piece into the stream.

I have the honor to be, most respectfully, your obedient servant,

Jas. N. Olney,

Lieutenant Colonel Second Infty. Colonel Vols., Commanding Humboldt Mil. Dist.

Major R. C. Drum, U. S. Army,

Assistant Adjutant-General, San Francisco.:

The following order to Captain E. B. Gibbs, Company E, 2nd California Infantry Regiment at Camp Curtis established a California Volunteer post at the ferry, likely in response to the above attack:

Special Orders, No. 4.

Hdqrs. Humboldt Military District, Fort Rumboldt, January 6, 1863.

I. Captain Gibbs, commanding at Camp Curtis, will put a detachment of twenty men under Lieutenant Gonnisson at Daley's Ferry, as soon as he is notified that Mr. Daley is ready to proceed thither.

II. Lieutenant Gonnisson will guard the ferry and ferry-house from attack, and will use every exertion to capture or destroy every band of hostile Indians that may come into his neighborhood, leaving always a sufficient force at the ferry for its defense.

III. In case of need Captain Gibbs will re-enforce Lieutenant Gonnisson to any extent that may be requisite. lie will forward Lieutenant Gonnisson's reports of scouts or military operations to these headquarters.

By order of Colonel Lippitt:

W. F. Swasey,

First Lieutenant and Regimental Quartermaster Second Infantry California Volunteers, Actg. Asst. Adjt. Gen.

Later in March 1863, the post was ordered reduced in strength:

Special Orders, No. 23.

Hdqrs. Humboldt Military District, Fort Humboldt, March 18, 1863.

Capt. E. B. Gibbs, Second Infantry California Volunteers, will withdraw the detachment at Daley's Ferry, except nine men, who will he kept posted there under a reliable non-commissioned officer. By order of Colonel Lippitt:

CHAS. H. BARTH, First Lieut, and Adjt. 2nd Infty. Cal. Vols., Actg. Asst. Adjt. Gen.

Company E left Camp Curtis in May 1863, apparently not being replaced by Company C, 1st Battalion California Volunteer Mountaineers until they were mustered in at Camp Curtis on August 29, 1863. The post is not referred to in department correspondence after March 1863 and so presumably was abandoned by May of that year.
