= Fort Baker (Humboldt County) =

Historic fort in California, US

Coordinates: 40°26′53″N 123°39′25″W

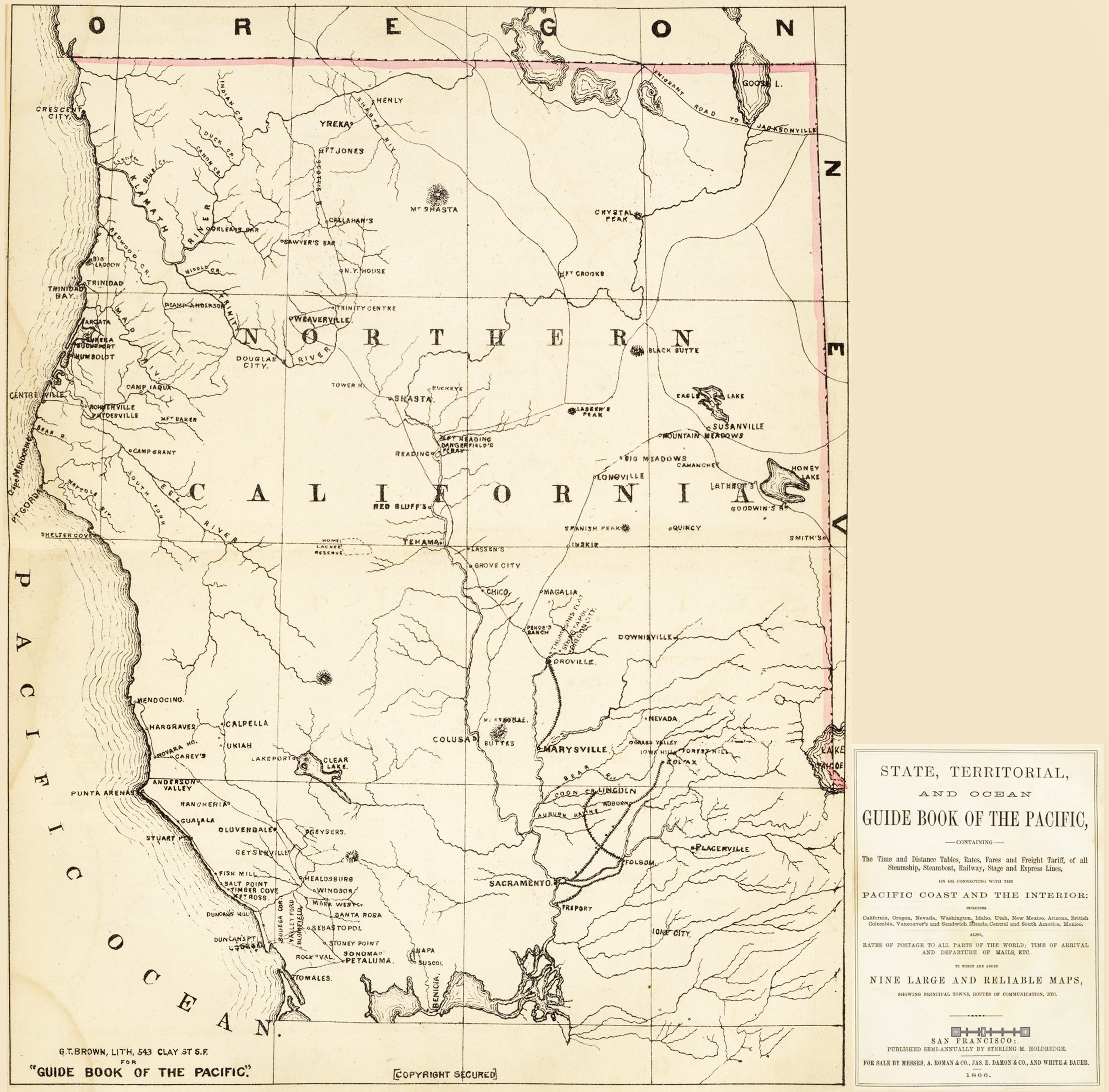
Fort Baker, follow a line east of Hydesville - on an 1866 map

Fort Baker, in Humboldt County, California, United States, was an outpost of the Union Army for the Bald Hills War from 1862 to 1863. It was located 14 miles (23 km) east of Bridgeville on State Highway 36 on the west bank of Van Duzen Creek in Larabee Valley. The site of Fort Baker has been obliterated by frequent flooding.

Fort Baker was established by Col. Francis J. Lippitt, commander of the Humboldt Military District as one of a number of posts to protect the settlers. It was the center of continued aggressive patrolling that finally forced Lassic and his Wailaki band to surrender on July 31, 1862, at Fort Baker. More of his warriors plus those of other bands came in on August 10 and the 212 captured Indians at Fort Baker were sent to join 462 others at Fort Humboldt. After the 850 captured hostiles were sent to the Smith River Reservation it was believed the war was nearly over. However Lassic and other warriors escaped and the war continued.

On September 7, 1863, Fort Baker was recommended for closure, to be replaced by Fort Iaqua. Fort Baker was abandoned before the end of 1863 and was burned on May 11 or 12, 1864 by persons unknown, suggestions included Confederate sympathizers or Indians.
