= Fort Wright =

Fort Wright may refer to:

- Fort Wright, Kentucky, a city in Kenton County, Kentucky
- Fort Wright (Tennessee), a Civil War fortification in Randolph, Tennessee
- Fort Wright (California), a fort in northwestern California near Covelo, California
- Fort H. G. Wright, a former U.S. military installation on Fishers Island, New York
- Fort George Wright, a former U.S. military installation near Spokane, Washington
