= Lone Star, California =

Lone Star, California may refer to:

- Lone Star, Fresno County, California
- Lone Star, Humboldt County, California
