= Edmund Underwood =

American soldier and Army officer

Edmund Underwood (c. 1826–1863) was a native of Pennsylvania who served in the Mexican American War and then as an officer in the U.S. Army.

== Biography ==
He was an officer in the 4th Infantry Regiment various posts in California and Oregon Territory and was a Major in the Union Army with the 18th Infantry Regiment during the early part of the American Civil War.

Underwood had served with distinction in the Mexican American War and on March 3, 1848, was offered and received a commission of Second Lieutenant in the 4th Infantry Regiment of the U. S. Army. In 1852, as a 2nd Lieutenant in the 4th Infantry Regiment he was sent to the Pacific Coast via Panama. Underwood with his wife served at Fort Humboldt in 1853. While there his first son Edmund Beardsley Underwood was born at the fort. Promoted 1st Lieutenant March 24, 1853, Edmund Underwood was stationed at Fort Reading, at the same time that Ulysses Simpson Grant was at Fort Humboldt.

In 1857, Captain Underwood returned to the east for a time. When he returned to the west coast in the fall of 1858 he was sent to Fort Humboldt where the Bald Hills War was beginning. Captain Underwood led a detachment from Fort Humboldt to a post at Pardee's Ranch, where they escorted pack trains over the Bald Hills to protect them from the attacks by the Whilkut. Later, Captain Underwood established Fort Gaston among the Hupa people on the Trinity River and commanded its garrison, a detachment from the U.S. 4th Infantry.

At the beginning of the American Civil War, on May 14, 1861, Underwood was promoted to major in command of the 2nd Battalion, U. S. 18th Infantry Regiment, and returned to the east to train his troops in Camp Thomas about four miles north of Columbus. On November 30, 1861, Underwood led his battalion when the 18th Regiment was ordered to proceed to, Louisville, Kentucky and report to General Buell, who was organizing the Army of the Ohio. Before the Regiment saw its first combat in April 1862, Underwood was no longer in command of 2nd Battalion, retiring February 27, 1862.

However, Underwood continued to serve as United States mustering and disbursing officer for the Northern District of New York. Underwood died at the age of 37, on September 5, 1863, at Utica, New York. He was buried at Oswego, New York.
