= Kneeland, California =

Unincorporated community in California, United States

Kneeland
- Unincorporated community
- Location in California Kneeland (the United States)
- Coordinates: 40°45′40″N 123°59′41″W
- Country: United States
- State: California
- County: Humboldt
- Elevation: 2,129 ft (649 m)

Kneeland (formerly, Kneeland Prairie) is an unincorporated community in Humboldt County, California, United States. It is located 7.5 miles (12 km) south-southwest of Korbel, at an elevation of 2,129 feet (649 m). Kneeland Airport is nearby. The ZIP code is 95549.

== Geography ==
Kneeland is located about 12 miles (19 km) east of Humboldt Bay, roughly equidistant from Eureka and Arcata (14 miles (23 km)). It is 283 miles (455 km) north of San Francisco.

=== Climate ===
This region experiences warm (but not hot) and dry summers, with no average monthly temperatures above 71.6 °F. Winters are cool and rainy, and while snow at sea level in Humboldt County is rare, light snowfall is typical several times a year in Kneeland because of the higher elevation. According to the Köppen Climate Classification system, Kneeland has a warm-summer Mediterranean climate, abbreviated "Csb" on climate maps.

== History ==
Humboldt County was occupied by several native groups of at least two language families prior to and after the European settlers arrived. The Wiyot people used the area around Kneeland for salmon and locally harvested roots as well as lamprey from the Eel River and other subsistence food items. They may have used fire to maintain the prairies around Kneeland for hunting. Estimates of California Indian populations prior to the whites vary widely, but there were about 1500 to 2000 Wiyot in the Humboldt region shortly before the arrival of the whites, however due to the Indian Island Massacre, other massacre events, Indian wars, introduced diseases, starvation and forced relocations, they numbered around 100 individuals. Today, many Wiyot live on the Table Bluff Reservation, located 16 miles (26 km) south of Eureka. The area around Kneeland was not settled by whites until after the California Gold Rush brought waves of new settlers to the region to supply inland gold miners.

The area around Kneeland was originally known as Kleizer's Prairie, but in 1852 with the establishment of a ranch by John A. Kneeland and his sister Mandala, the area became known as Kneeland's Prairie. Other sources cite the name to Tom and John A. Kneeland, first American settlers there.

As more settlers arrived, conflict with the Indians resulted in the establishment of two U.S. Army stations Camp Lyon (1862) and Camp Iaqua (1863), nearby and Army soldiers patrolled settler's ranches. Until the Homestead Act of 1862 permitted formal settlement, there were conflicts between settlers and squatters. The former small holders sold out in the 1870s and the land became consolidated into large ranches and at the turn of the century, these large ranches were owned by prominent local families.

Some stage hotels were built in the 1880s. After World War II a sawmill was built to support the commercial logging that drove the local economy.

The Kneeland post office operated from 1880 to 1891 and from 1892 until 2011, when it was slated for closure by USPS due to lack of funding.

Kneeland Airport has operated as a non-towered airport since it opened in September 1964. It provides a location for small planes to make emergency landings, since the other Humboldt County airports at lower elevations often become fog bound before Kneeland. The airport also hosts a helitack base for the Cal Fire Humboldt-Del Norte unit.

The Kneeland Volunteer Fire Department was founded in the early 1980s. Later in 1990 a voter initiative approved the creation of the Kneeland Fire Protection District to be funded with a special parcel tax. They provide emergency response to over 100 square miles of mountainous rural areas.

== Economy ==
Kneeland is a rural community with no central downtown district. Significant locations are the Kneeland Elementary School building near a central crossroads, the Kneeland Airport, and the Kneeland Firehouse. Logging continues in the surrounding timberland.

Most of the ranches and the few houses past the post office and toward Bridgeville are also referred to as Kneeland. The cemetery is a 8 miles (13 km) from the post office. Memorial Day weekend brings a few of the locals out for a cleanup and get-together to commemorate the history of this small community.

== Education ==
The Kneeland Prairie School District was split from the Bucksport district in 1869, and the first classes were held in a teacher's home before the construction of a one-room schoolhouse in 1873 with separate outhouses for boys and girls. Two other nearby schools were in operation at the time: Iaqua School (in Iaqua) and Lone Star (in Lone Star), but these were later amalgamated with Kneeland School.

Today Kneeland is the seat of the Kneeland Elementary School District,. The current Kneeland School was built in 1880 and serves grades K-8. It underwent modernization in 1951, and again in the 1980s. The Kneeland School is one of California's smallest public schools, with a 2022 enrollment of 33 students in grades K-8.

== Demographics ==
According to the 2000 U.S. Census, the population of Kneeland was 244. The population was 51.6% female and 48.4% male. The median age of the population was 41.5, higher than the national median of 35.3.

The population was 95.9% White, 1.6% Native American or Alaskan Native, 0.9% other races, and 1.6% identified with two or more races. Only 2.2% of the population was foreign born, and of those, 50.0% were born in Guatemala.

For the population 18 years and over, 89.3% had a high school education or higher: 8.6% had a high school diploma or equivalency, 32.1% had some college education but no degree, 39.0% had attained a bachelor's degree, and 9.6% had earned a graduate or professional degree.
