= Camp Mattole =

Camp Mattole, was a temporary post of a detachment of California Volunteer Mountaineers fighting the Bald Hills War, in early 1864.

Camp Mattole was located 24 miles west of Weott, California in Humboldt County. The camp was established by 2nd Lieutenant William W. Frazier, commanding a detachment of Company E, 1st Battalion California Volunteer Mountaineers, which were local troops specially organized in 1863 for service against Indian hostiles in Humboldt County. Company E was raised by Captain John P. Simpson in Mendocino County and mustered into Army service at Fort Humboldt and stationed at the time at Camp Grant. Lieutenant Frazier and his men had several engagements with the Indians on the Upper Mattole River during February 1864, killing 13 of them and capturing 21 prisoners and the Skirmish at Matole May 26, 1864.
