= Camp Grant =

Camp Grant may refer to:

- Camp Grant, California
- Camp Grant (Illinois)
- Camp Grant (Arizona), site of the Camp Grant massacre
