= Fort Wright (California) =

19th century Army post in Round Valley of Mendocino County

Coordinates: 39.8158°N 123.2653°W

Fort Wright was an Army post located in the Round Valley of Mendocino County, about 1.5 miles (2.4 km) s northwest of the present town of Covelo, California. The principal duty of the garrison was to protect the Round Valley Indian Reservation's native inhabitants from the intrusions, thefts and murderous attacks of explorers, some white settlers and state-sponsored massacres.

== Early military presence ==
In 1858, Second Lieutenant Edward Dillard of the 6th U. S. Infantry established the Nome Cult Indian Agency as a temporary tent camp in the valley and supervised the troops garrisoned there. They abandoned it when they were withdrawn to Fort Bragg in July or September 1861. By this time, nearly 2,000 Native Americans living in Round Valley had been murdered. Many others had been enslaved under a California law allowing the indenture of the state's native people. Superintendent for Indian Affairs for Northern California George N. Hanson urgently requested federal aid in protecting the peaceful survivors from these attacks. Brigadier General George Wright, the newly-promoted head of Department of the Pacific, ordered the establishment of martial law in Round Valley and on October 28, 1862, Colonel Francis J. Lippitt of the 2nd California Volunteer Infantry Regiment ordered Captain Charles D. Douglas to lead his troops to march from Fort Gaston to Fort Humboldt, travel from there by ship to Fort Bragg and then march to Round Valley. Difficulty finding a ship, becalmed, foggy seas, and heavy rains on the overland trek to Round Valley resulted in the troops not arriving there until December 11, 1862.

== The fort and Native American affairs ==
Upon arrival, Douglas shut down the only business selling whiskey, reconnoitered the valley, chose the permanent fort site and named it Fort Wright in honor of General Wright. He then investigated the causes of the violence and suggested that the Indian Agency employees, who were the reservation authorities, were the source of the problems between the native Yuki and the settlers. James Short, the indian agent, had gotten his job because he was a friend of Abraham Lincoln's, and his two sons were his assistants. They had either built such flimsy fencing to protect the Yuki's crops that the settlers' livestock easily broke it down, or they built no fencing at all. The settler's livestock ate all the Yuki's crops. With winter coming, the natives' choice was to starve, steal cattle or leave the reservation, which was illegal. Many of them left anyway. Short also bought things for the reservation from the settlers on credit and never paid them. A month later Douglas reported that the Short was preventing his only responsible employee from repairing the fences. Douglas hinted that the agent was trying to starve the Yuki into provoking a fight, providing a reason for their extermination. These recommendations were passed up the chain of command, with the comment that Douglas was an intelligent, observant officer. Then Sharp travelled to Washington DC. After this, General Wright revoked the martial law order and instructed that everything be returned to the condition it was in when Douglas entered the valley, except for liquor sales. That was still banned.

The following July 20, enslaved Yuki farm workers burned a settler's barn and hay. Settlers claimed it was part of a plot to kill all of them in the valley. Investigating this, Douglas found it to be true. The Yuki leader and three of his tribe, all enslaved, planned to work in concert with other enslaved farm laborers from the mountain tribes to kill as many whites as they could. The next day Douglas arrested five of the plot's leaders and, based on testimony of settlers and Yuki people that confirmed their involvement, had all the natives in the valley assemble at the fort. He explained to them that if they would be "good indians," they would be cared for and protected. If not, then they suffer the same fate as these leaders. Then he had the men hanged. In his report he said that no natives from the reservation had been involved.

Douglas witnessed California's Trail of Tears and reported on September 27, 1863, that the indian agent was grossly irresponsible in his reaction to the needs of the arriving Native Americans who were extremely sick with malaria. Douglas himself sent the fort's doctor to tend the neglected survivors and dispatched his small number of troops out to aid those sick and dying along the trail. A month later, on October 30, he received a letter from the Adjutant General of the Department of the Pacific ordering him to let the Indian Agency handle all affairs related to the Native Americans when they were peaceful and only intervene with those that were warlike. Two weeks after this, on November 13, he received another letter from Sparrow Purdy, the officer who led the Konkow Maidu on the Trail of Tears, telling him use all means available to him to keep the natives on the reservation, especially telling him not to let whites interfere in the "domestic arrangements" of the native population. Purdy repeated these instructions a week later.

In 1863 and 1864 the 14 Douglas kept his troops busy erected camp buildings with log walls and shingle roofs: two officers' quarters, barracks, a mess hall, bakery, hospital, guardhouse, storehouse and stables. They were so few and were so busy building camp structures that he couldn't spare troops to fulfill an order to keep a constant scouting party in the field. When Douglas replied to the order to keep a constant scouting party in the field, which he wrote April 4, 1864, he stated a need for reinforcements for his small group of men. He repeated that request more urgently in August 1864 when he reported that many of the residents of Mendocino county and the neighboring counties were Southern sympathizers. An officer of another unit had heard talk among them of taking the fort, its weapons and supplies if there was any rebellion in California against the federal government. Austin Wiley, the new Superintendent of Indian Affairs, restated this need in a letter he wrote to the army on October 4, 1864, resulting in Company A of the 1st Battalion of Native California Cavalry being ordered to Fort Wright on November 12. In April of 1865, one Round Valley resident publicly expressed satisfaction on hearing about Abraham Lincoln's assassination and another gave the rebel yell. This was reported to Douglas and in June he arrested these men along with two others and a female school teacher who stomped on the national flag when she heard about the assassination. The woman was released but the men were sent to San Francisco, eventually serving five days of hard labor at Alcatraz Federal Penitentiary. Captain Douglas was still in charge of the fort on December 31, 1864, but by June 30, 1865, James H. Delaney was in command there.

It was designated a camp after the end of the Civil War. In 1869 they replaced the log barracks with an adobe building and established a military reservation that was one square mile.

June 17, 1875, the troops were withdrawn and the facilities transferred to the Department of the Interior's Indian Service because of the stable, good relations with the natives in Round Valley. The land of the military reservation was divided into ten-acre allotments given to the natives.

== Commander ==
- Captain Charles D. Douglas, Second California Infantry, December 11, 1862 – June 1865

== Garrisons ==
- Company F, 2nd Regiment California Volunteer Infantry, December 11, 1862 – June 1865
- Company A, 1st Battalion of Native Cavalry, California Volunteers, November 1864 – February 1865

== Operations ==
- April 7–11, 1863. Expedition from Fort Wright to Williams' Valley, California, with skirmish (Apr. 9th) in Williams' Valley.
- July 20–26, 1863. Operations in Round Valley, California
