= Kneeland Elementary School District =

School district in California

Address
- 9313 Kneeland Road Kneeland, California, 95549; United States

District information
- Type: Public
- Grades: K–8
- NCES District ID: 0619980

Students and staff
- Students: 26
- Teachers: 1.4 (FTE)
- Staff: 3.15 (FTE)
- Student–teacher ratio: 18.57

Other information
- Website: humboldt.k12.ca.us/kneeland_sd

The Kneeland Elementary School District, headquartered in Kneeland, California, oversees public education, through grade 8, in a portion of east central Humboldt County, California. The school it operates is a two-room K-8 school in Kneeland.

The school board consists of three members:

- Michelle Krupa - President
- Steve Schmalz
- Seth Lancaster

The superintendent is Carole Boshears.
