= Edmund Beardsley Underwood =

Governor of American Samoa (1853–1928)

Edmund Beardsley Underwood (1853 – April 12, 1928) was a Commodore in the United States Navy. Born in March 1853, at Humboldt Bay, in California, he was the son of U.S. Army Lieutenant Edmund Underwood and Mary Moore Beardsley. He graduated from the United States Naval Academy in 1873. He was Commandant (and therefore Acting Governor) of American Samoa from May 5, 1903 to January 30, 1905. He retired in 1910.

As Governor of American Samoa, Underwood sought to eliminate communal land ownership. He founded a monthly newspaper, O Le Faatonu, which was distributed freely for fifty years, providing news about government activities and global events. As Governor, he also tackled the complex issue of land ownership between Tutuila and Upolu residents, who were separated from their lands. Together with Governor Wilhelm Solf of Western Samoa, Underwood attempted to address this problem through potential land exchanges and compensation, but they were unable to reach a resolution.

Governor Underwood visited the Manuʻa Islands in October 1903. During his visit, he discovered that the Tuimanua might agree to cede the Manuʻa Islands to the United States if the U.S. Navy would construct schools there. Seizing this opportunity, Underwood facilitated the provision of school materials to Tuimanua the following year. Edwin William Gurr, the Secretary of Native Affairs, successfully returned with a Deed of Cession for the Manuʻa Islands, signed by the Tuimanua and the Fatatui of Manuʻa. Shortly before the end of Underwood's tenure, the term "Governor" was officially designated as the title for the commander of the U.S. Naval Station Tutuila.

Racial hierarchies shaped Governor Underwood's perception of the relative skills of workers. Underwood’s racialized language suggests that carpenters who were local Samoans, did not meet his expectations. He characterized them as "lazy, indifferent, or migratory," a view that reflects long-standing racial stereotypes about Samoan indolence. The idea of Native indolence, prevalent at the time, portrayed Samoans, like other colonized peoples, as lazy, unreliable, and inconstant workers who were unsuitable for complex or long-term labor projects.
