= Lafayette Guild =

LaFayette Guild
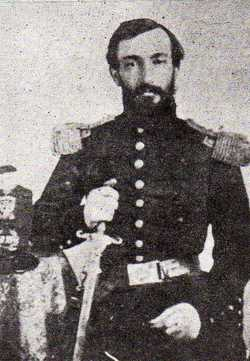
- Born: November 25, 1825; Tuscaloosa, Alabama, US
- Died: July 4, 1870 (aged 44); San Francisco, California, US
- Burial place: Evergreen Cemetery, Tuscaloosa, Alabama
- Military career
- Allegiance: United States; Confederate States of America
- Branch: United States Army; Confederate States Army
- Service years: 1849–61 (USA); 1861–65 (CSA)
- Rank: Chief Surgeon and Medical Director of the Army of Northern Virginia
- Conflicts: American Civil War

LaFayette Guild (November 25, 1825 – July 4, 1870) was a surgeon in the antebellum United States Army, a noted pioneer in the study of yellow fever, and then a leading medical administrator in the Confederate States Army during the American Civil War. He served directly under General Robert E. Lee as the medical director for the Army of Northern Virginia for all its major campaigns, including the Gettysburg campaign and the Overland Campaign.

== Biography ==
=== Early life and career ===
LaFayette Guild was the third of eight children and second of four sons of Mary Elizabeth Williams (1802–1885) and Dr James L Guild (1799–1884). His mother was a daughter of Agnes Payne (1775–1850) and Judge Marmaduke Williams (1772–1850). His grandmother Agnes was a first cousin of Dolley Madison. Judge Williams was an early settler of Alabama and was the losing candidate in the first Alabama gubernatorial race in 1819; he was also a longtime trustee of the University of Alabama. LaFayette's father was the brother of Judge Josephus Conn Guild (1802–1883) of Tennessee. (See Rose Mont.)

A native of Tuscaloosa, Alabama, Guild briefly moved to Texas but returned to Alabama for college. He graduated from the University of Alabama in 1845 and then from Jefferson Medical College in Philadelphia in 1848. He was appointed as assistant surgeon in the U.S. Army on March 2, 1849. He served in various assignments, then became the medical director of the army post on Governor's Island in New York Harbor.

Guild studied the impact of the quarantine station, and found that isolating ill soldiers and United States Navy sailors did not prevent the spread of certain diseases such as yellow fever. In his opinion, the disease was not merely contagious, but infectious and portable. His observations were used to combat and limit an outbreak of yellow fever in 1856.

The following year, he moved to the West Coast to direct the military hospital in the Presidio of San Francisco, where he was stationed when the Civil War erupted. According to several sources, including the 1860 U.S. census, Guild was also stationed at Fort Humboldt as that post's surgeon.

=== Civil War ===
In July 1861, still with the rank of assistant surgeon, Guild was dismissed from the Federal army after refusing to take the oath of allegiance. He subsequently traveled to the South and accepted a surgeon's commission in the Confederate forces in Richmond, Virginia. He became chief surgeon and medical director of the Army of Northern Virginia during the Peninsula Campaign in 1862 after Robert E. Lee replaced Gen.Joseph E. Johnston in command and established his own leadership staff. He remained in that role until the army's surrender at Appomattox Court House.

Following the Battle of Chancellorsville, Guild worked directly with Jonathan Letterman, his counterpart in the Union Army of the Potomac, to arrange a truce and a procedure so that each army could collect its wounded from the contested battlefield. During Lee's retreat following the Battle of Gettysburg in July 1863, Guild oversaw the evacuation of the Confederate wounded and their subsequent protection by cavalry under Brig. Gen. John D. Imboden.

Guild was often frustrated by the inability of the Confederate government to maintain a consistent source of medical supplies to the army in the field. However, his pre-war observations of the spread of infectious or communicable diseases helped him establish a series of protocols within the doctors of the Army of Northern Virginia to help combat the spread of venereal diseases such as syphilis, as well as other potentially deadly illnesses.

Guild served for much of the war as Lee's personal physician and medical consultant, and from the Siege of Petersburg until the end of the war, he was often accompanied by his wife Martha Aylette Fitts "Pattie" Guild (1831–1902), who moved to Virginia to be near her husband.

=== Postbellum ===
Following the war, Guild moved to Mobile, Alabama, and fought yellow fever as the medical inspector for the Port of Mobile. He published many of his observations, which formed the basis for future research in combating the deadly disease.

Guild died in San Francisco, California, and was interred in Evergreen Cemetery in his native Tuscaloosa, Alabama. His wife Pattie died in 1902 and is buried beside him.

The Lafaytte Guild chapter of the Gorgas Medical Society at the University of Alabama is named in his honor.
