= Camp Lyon (California) =

Coordinates: 40.7374°N 123.8803°W

Camp Lyon, sometimes called Fort Lyon, was established March 1862 as a temporary California Volunteer post located about 20 miles southeast of Arcata, California, on the right bank of the Mad River at Brehmer's Ranch, opposite Blue Slide Creek near Kneeland, California. Company K, 2nd Regiment California Volunteer Infantry was ordered to Camp Lyon December 1861, and served there until the fort was abandoned.
