= Fort Ter-Waw =

- Location within California Location within the United States
- 41.50992°N 123.98855°W
- Location: Ter-Wer Riffle and Klamath Glen Rds., Klamath, California

California Historical Landmark
- Reference no.: 544

Fort Ter-Waw was a fortified position of U.S. Army located at the site of the present-day town of Klamath Glen, California, United states. The location is six miles (9.7 km) upstream from the mouth of the Klamath River in the former Klamath River Reservation.

Fort Ter-Waw was a United States military post created to establish an occupying force on the Klamath River Reservation that could "keep the peace" between the Tolowa and Yurok Native American tribes and white settlers. It was established in what was then Klamath County, October 12, 1857, by First Lieutenant George Crook and the men of Company D, US 4th Infantry Regiment. The fort was part of the Humboldt Military District headquartered at Fort Humboldt. Most of the fort was destroyed during the Great Flood of 1862 in December 1861 and abandoned June 10, 1862. The garrison was moved to Camp Lincoln.

The site is now in Del Norte County and is marked by a California Historical Landmark (#544). Its location can be found from Hwy 101, taking Ter-Wer Valley exit (Hwy 169), going 3.4 mi to the end of the road, and turning right on Ter-Wer Riffle Road. The site is at the intersection of Ter-Wer Riffle Road and Trinity Way in Klamath Glen.
