= 1st California Mountaineers Battalion =

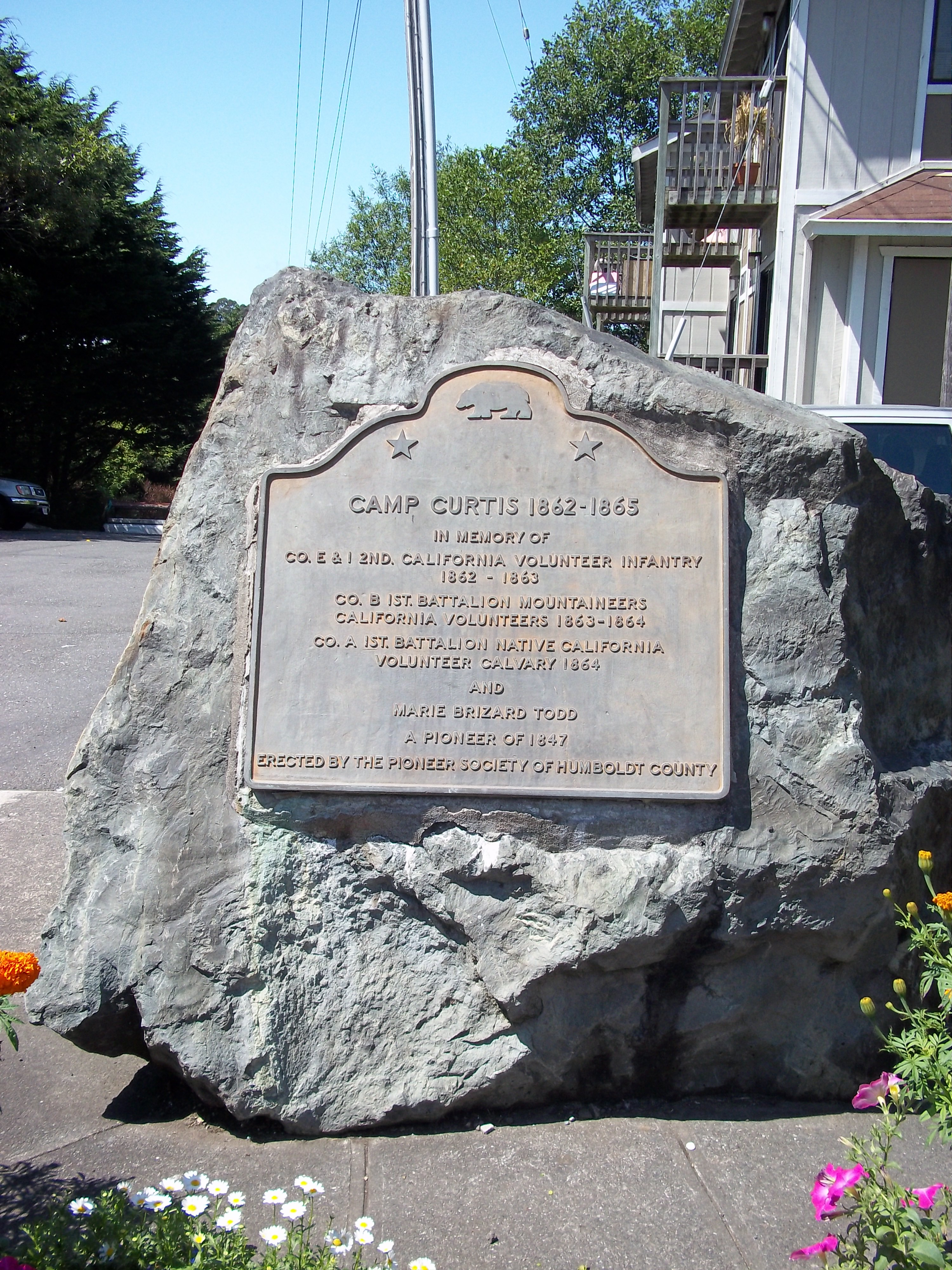
- Camp Curtis plaque
- Active: May 30, 1863 to June 14, 1865
- Country: United States
- Allegiance: Union
- Branch: Infantry
- Engagements: Bald Hills War

1st Battalion California Volunteer Mountaineers was an infantry battalion in the Union Army during the American Civil War. It spent its entire term of service in the western United States, attached to the Department of the Pacific. It was organized from men from the counties of Humboldt, Mendocino, Trinity, Klamath, Siskiyou, and Del Norte, and other parts of California, between May 30, 1863, and March 16, 1864, for special service in the Bald Hills War in Humboldt County within the Humboldt Military District. The Battalion mustered out June 14, 1865.

== Organization ==
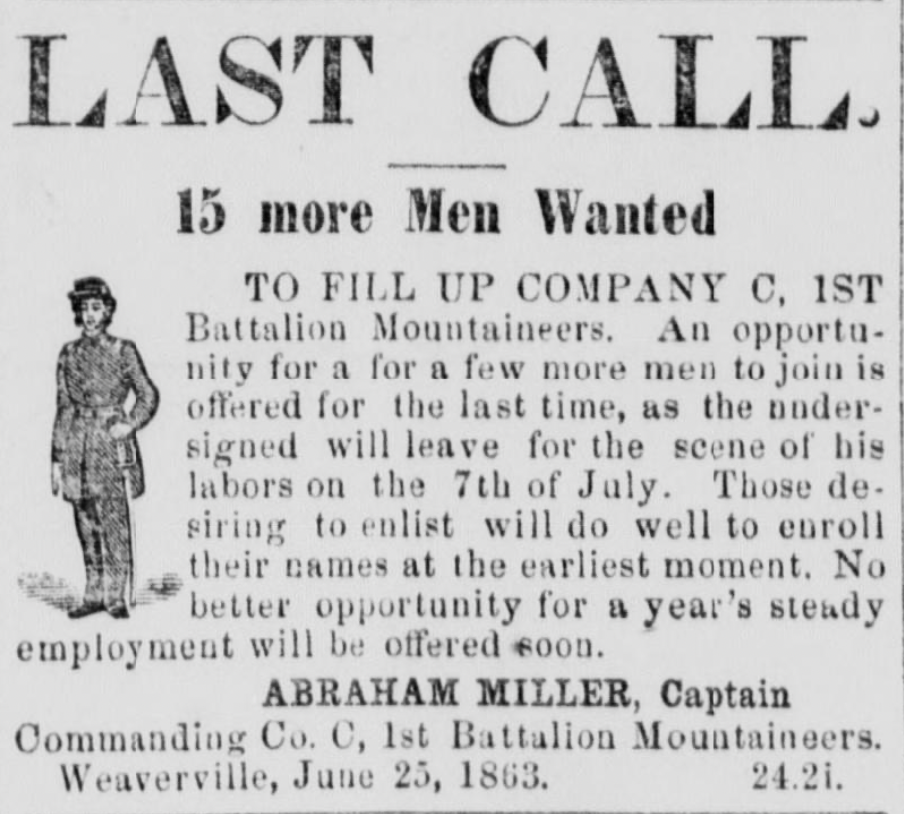
Company C recruitment ad

In a report to Lieut. Col. R. C. Drum, Assistant Adjutant-General, Department of the Pacific on October 13, 1862, following the escape of Lassic and several hundred other warriors from the Smith River Reservation, Col. Francis J. Lippitt, Commander of the Humboldt Military District:

In short, the state of things is far worse than when we arrived. My previous reports will suffice, I think, to show that for this result neither I nor my officers and men are responsible. The truth is, two companies of State volunteers could be raised here, consisting of old hunters and mountaineers familiar with the habits of the Indians and accustomed to hunt them, that would be of far more service than a whole regiment of the finest troops in the world, no matter how active and zealous they might be. .

Governor Stanford called for the organization of the Mountaineer Battalion on the recommendation General Wright on February 7, 1863, in the following proclamation:

PROCLAMATION.

Whereas, Brigadier-General Wright, of the U. S. Army, commanding the Department of the Pacific, has called upon me for a battalion of six Companies of troops (infantry) for special service against the Indians in the Humboldt District, in this State, to serve until discharged by him:

Now, therefore, I, Leland Stanford, Governor of the State of California and commander-in-chief of the militia thereof do call upon the citizens of the frontier counties of Humboldt, Mendocino, Trinity, Klamath, Siskiyou, and Del Norte, of this State, as many as shall be necessary to fill up the foregoing requisition, to organize themselves into companies, to be mustered into the service of the United States as hereby required. The requisite officers for this force will be commissioned by the Governor.

Done at Sacramento, Cal., this 7th day of February, in the year of our Lord 1863.

LELAND STANFORD, Governor. Attest: WM. H. WEEKS, Secretary of State. By A. A. H. TUTTLE, Deputy.

EXECUTIVE DEPARTMENT, Sacramento, February 7, 1863.

== 1st Battalion California Volunteer Mountaineers Commanders ==
- Lieutenant-Colonel Stephen G. Whipple

== Company assignments ==
- Headquarters Staff Enrolled and mustered on June 22, 1863. The headquarters of the battalion was stationed at Fort Humboldt, California, until September, 1863. It then moved to Fort Gaston, until September, 1864; then back to Fort Humboldt until the June 15, 1865, when the field and staff officers were mustered out.
- Company A This company was raised in Humboldt County by Captain C. W. Long, enrolled from April 18 and mustered on June 22, 1863, at Fort Humboldt June, 1863. Stationed at Fort Baker until October, 1863. On the July 7, 1863, "Sergeant Sevier took the field against the Indians on Mad River, northeast of Camp Baker. On the eleventh attacked a small band, killing two and wounding one. Returned to post on the twelfth."

A detachment of A Company joined detachments of B and C Company under Captain Ousley (A Co.), in the Christian Prairie engagement on December 26, 1863.

The company was next stationed at Camp Curtis and Camp Iaqua until April, 1864 having a Skirmish at Redwood Creek, February 29, 1864. Company A, moved to Fort Gaston until November, 1864; engaging in the Skirmish at Redwood Mountains March 1 and the Skirmish at Kneeland's Prairie May 1, 1864. It then returned to Camp Iaqua conducting operations in Humboldt District during the balance of its term of service, until mustered out at Fort Humboldt, April 25, 1865.

- Company B This company was raised by Captain George W. Ousley at Arcata, Humboldt County, enrolled from April 15 and mustered on June 2, 1863. Ordered to Fort Gaston until January, 1864; fighting at the Skirmish at Oak Camp June 6, 1863; Skirmish at Thomas' Ranch November 12; Skirmish at Trinity River November 13 and the Skirmish at Willow Creek November 17:

Captain Ousley, with a detachment of fifteen men, had an engagement with the Indians on Willow Creek, about eight miles from Fort Gaston, Cal., in which Captain Ousley and two privates were wounded.

It fought a Skirmish at Christian Prairie near Fort Gaston:

On December 26, 1863, Captain Ousley, with a detachment of thirty men, with mountain howitzer, attacked Indian fortifications on Christian Prairie, about twenty-three miles from Fort Gaston. Private C. Smith was wounded in the arm. The amount of damage done the enemy was two killed and several wounded. Two horses, two inules, four guns, several saddles, and some other articles of property were recovered, and the houses destroyed, together with a large quantity of Indian provisions. This engagement was participated in by detachments of Companies A, B, and C of the battalion.

Next was duty at Camp Anderson until October, 1864; where if fought the Skirmish near Boynton's Prairie May 6, 1864. It then had duty at Camp Curtis until June, 1865, conducting a scout from Camp Anderson to Bald Mountain August 8–12, 1864. Mustered out May 13, 1865.

- Company C This company was raised by Captain Abraham Miller in Humboldt and Trinity Counties, enrolled from May 8 and mustered on August 29, 1863. It was stationed at Camp Curtis until October, 1863; engaging in Skirmishes at Redwood Creek July 9 and 11, 1863.

Ordered to Fort Gaston until May, 1864. Engaged in skirmishes at Thomas' Ranch November 11, 1863, and Trinity River November 13, 1863. A detachment of C Company joined detachments of A and B Company under Captain Ousley (B Co.), in the Christian Prairie engagement on December 25–26, 1863 near Fort Gaston.

It was then at Burnt Ranch, Trinity County, until November, 1864; engaging in a Skirmish at the Thomas House, on the Trinity River, May 27, 1864.

It was then at Fort Gaston until April, 1865, engaging in Operations in Trinity Valley from September 1 to December 3, 1864. It was then at Camp Iaqua during the balance of its term of service and was mustered out at Fort Humboldt, May 23, 1865.

- Company D Raised by Captain William C. Martin, enrolled from September 30, 1863, and mustered at Fort Gaston, Humboldt County, March 16, 1864. The company was stationed at that post during its whole term of service. It was mustered out at Fort Humboldt, Cal., May 20, 1865.
- Company E This company was raised by Captain John P. Simpson in Mendocino County, enrolled from May 1 and mustered on August 31, 1863, at Fort Humboldt. It was stationed at Fort Humboldt until October, 1863; then duty at Camp Grant, except for the time spent in the field against the hostile Indians until mustered out May 23, 1865. Company E was involved in the Skirmish at Grouse Creek May 23, 1864; a Skirmish at Matole May 26, 1864; Skirmish at Big Flat May 28, 1864; Expedition to North Fork Eel River September 1–29, 1864. It was mustered out at Fort Humboldt, June 14, 1865.
- Company F Raised by Captain Robert Baird at Fort Jones and other places in Siskiyou County, enrolled from August 25, 1863, and mustered in San Francisco, February 19, 1864. It served at the Forks of Salmon River, (then in Klamath County, but now in Siskiyou County), until July, 1864; then at Fort Gaston until October, 1864; then at the mouth of the Klamath River and en route to Camp Lincoln during the month of October, 1864; then at Camp Lincoln during balance of its term of service. It was mustered out at Camp Lincoln, June 9, 1865. There are no remarks on the muster rolls or monthly returns showing the service performed by this company.

== See also ==
- List of California Civil War Union units
