= Fort Humboldt State Historic Park =

State historic park in Eureka, California

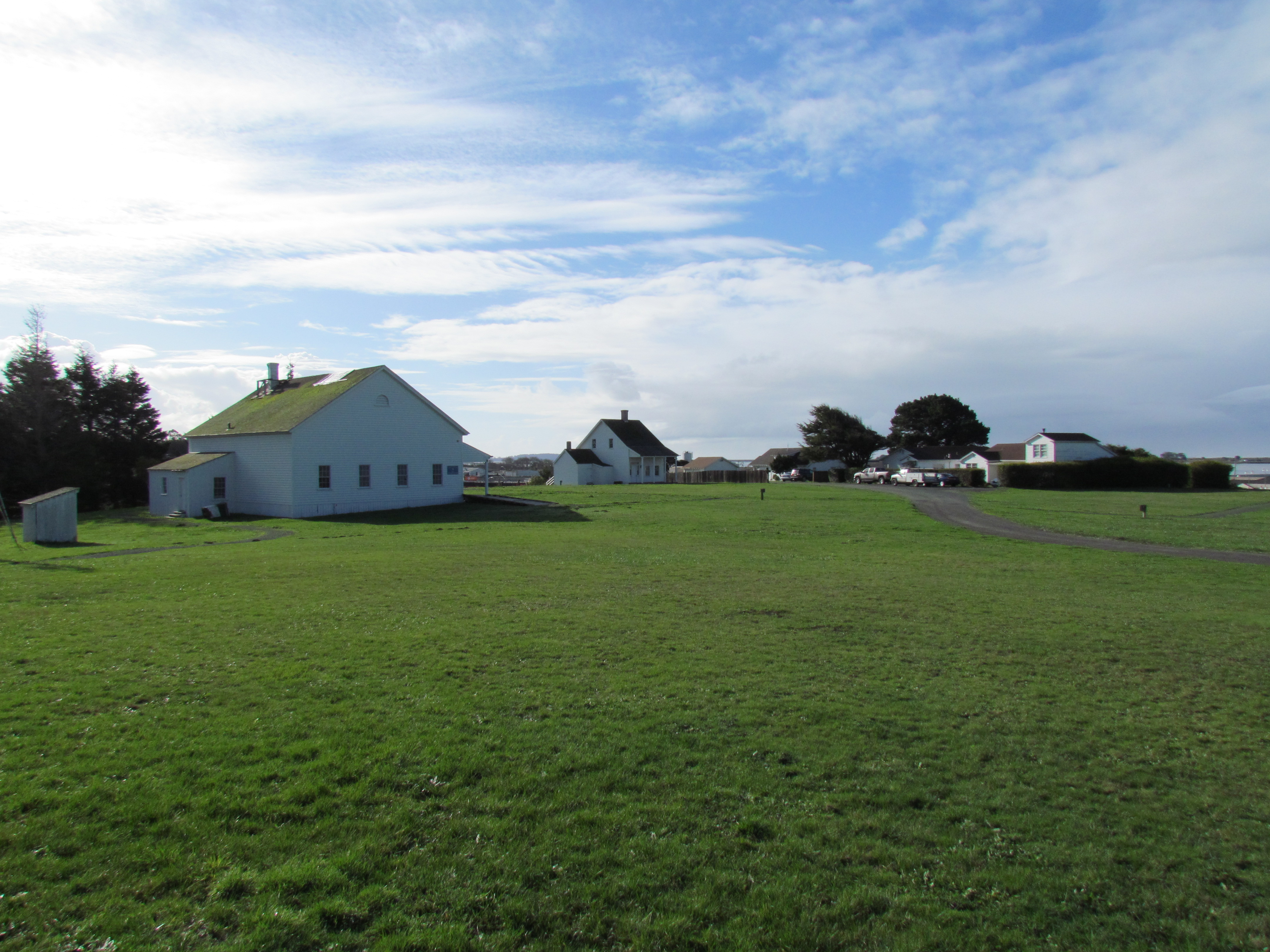
- View of Fort Humboldt

- Location within California Location within the United States
- Location: Humboldt County, California, United States
- Nearest city: Eureka, California
- Coordinates: 40°46′37″N 124°11′20″W
- Area: 18 acres (7.3 ha)
- Established: 1955
- Governing body: California Department of Parks and Recreation

California Historical Landmark
- Reference no.: 154
- Website: https://www.parks.ca.gov/?page_id=665

Fort Humboldt State Historic Park is a California state park, located in Eureka, California, United States. Its displays interpret the former U.S. Army fort, which was staffed from 1853 to 1870, the interactions between European Americans and Native Americans in roughly the same period, logging equipment and local narrow gauge railroad history of the region. Within the collection, there are trains, logging equipment, including a fully functional Steam Donkey engine, and an authentic Native American dug-out canoe. The Fort overlooks Humboldt Bay from atop a bluff. The North Coast regional headquarters of the California State Parks system is located onsite.

== History ==
=== Early years, 1853–1860 ===
With the discovery of gold in the Trinity River in Trinity County in May 1849, the stage was set for conflict between the Native Americans who lived in northwestern California and the settlers and gold seekers that flooded into the region. After repeated depredations by white settlers, Northern California tribes such as the Yurok, Karuk, Wiyot, and Hupa retaliated and the Army was sent to attempt to restore order.

Fort Humboldt was established on January 30, 1853, by the Army as a buffer between Native Americans, gold-seekers and settlers under the command of Brevet Lieutenant Colonel Robert C. Buchanan of the U.S. 4th Infantry Regiment. Like Buchanan, many of the soldiers of this unit were veterans of the Mexican–American War. Starting about 1853, Seth Kinman was hired as a market hunter to supply elk meat to the fort. Fort Humboldt was sited on a strategic location on the bluff overlooking Humboldt Bay and Bucksport, a town named after David Buck, a member of the Josiah Gregg exploration party.

In addition to protecting local inhabitants, it was also a supply depot for posts around the California and Oregon borders such as Fort Gaston in Hoopa and Fort Bragg in northern Mendocino County.

At its peak, the fort had 14 buildings all of crude plank construction. The fort was laid out in a typical military design with a quad at the center of the post which served as its parade grounds. Along with the two buildings that served as barracks for the enlisted men, there were quarters for the officers, an office, a hospital, a bakery, a storehouse/commissary, a guardhouse, a blacksmith's shop, and a stable.

The period between the fort's establishment and the beginning of the American Civil War was marked by many skirmishes between the settlers and the local tribes. One of the first major conflicts was the so-called Red Cap War, fought in the area around present-day Weitchpec and Orleans. Soldiers from Fort Humboldt were called into action to bring calm back to the area during this conflict. The leaders and soldiers of the fort were often criticized by settlers who sought a more violent response to Native American attacks.

The infamous Indian Island Massacre of the Wiyot people occurred at the end of this period on 25 February 1860. The fort's commander at this time, Major Gabriel J. Rains, reported to his commanding officer that "Captain Wright's Company [of vigilantes] held a meeting at Eel River and resolved to kill every peaceable Indian – man, woman, and child." After the massacre, Rains sheltered over 300 Indians at the Fort, and provided them with an armed escort to Klamath.

==== Life on the Fort ====
The 1860 U.S. census provides a snapshot of life on the fort. Among its residents that year were Major Gabriel Rains, his wife Mary, their six children (including 2 daughters age 19 and 16) a servant and an indentured Native American girl. Rains was Commander of the fort from 1856 until 1860 (he joined the Confederacy at the onset of the American Civil War. The Rains family and servants lived in the Commander's Quarters, the largest building on the fort. Also living at the fort were Captain Charles Lovell, his wife Margeret, and their four children; Lieutenant Alex Johnson, his wife Elizabeth, and their four children; Lieutenant James Dodwell, his wife Johanna, and their two children; and Lieutenant Edward Johnson, his wife Christiana, and their two children. The fort's physician Lafayette Guild and his wife Martha occupied the Surgeon's Quarters. In the barracks were 47 soldiers, all apparently living without their spouses.

Among the many well-known soldiers who served at the fort was a young captain, Ulysses S. Grant, who was there for five months in 1854 and served as quartermaster. Charles S. Lovell was promoted to major and commanded a brigade during the Second Battle of Bull Run, Antietam, and Fredericksburg. Robert C. Buchanan became a general during the Civil War. Other Civil War generals, George Crook and Lewis C. Hunt, served here during this period. Gabriel J. Rains would become a brigadier general in the Confederate Army. Dr. Lafayette Guild would go on to serve directly under General Robert E. Lee as the Medical Director for the Army of Northern Virginia for all its major campaigns.

This site had two large, two-story company barracks used by the enlisted soldiers. About 40 men ate and slept there.

Soldiers were required to supplement the fort's food by cultivating gardens. Soldiers, usually not of a farming background, and faced with a difficult climate of cool weather year-round, did a poor job of tending to their gardens although the labor of wives or servants helped. Gardens also contained non-native ornamental flowers. Some fort surgeons learned from the Yurok and Wiyot people the use native plants as medicine.

The fort commissary served as its general store and as a supplier to surrounding settlers. Everything a soldier needed was provided including uniforms, blankets and whiskey. Keeping supplies at the fort was the responsibility of the quartermaster in the 1850s. Goods arrived by ship. Due in part to the Gold Rush, there was a high rate of desertion at the fort leading to soldiers that went "Absent without leave" often times robbing the commissary before running off and causing shortages of some supplies until the next ship arrived. Elk meat was provided to the fort by local hunter Seth Kinman.

The 1 1/2 story surgeon's quarters (now represented by a replica) was used from 1854 to 1857 by Dr. Josiah Simpson, best-known of the surgeons, due to his wife Harriet's letters written to family members. They had two children at the time. The Simpsons often held parties for the officers and their families. The cold, damp weather resulted in Mrs. Simpson moving into the front parlor where she cooked, slept and played the melodeon, a simple form of pump organ, near the warmth of the fireplace.

=== Civil War years, 1861–1865 ===
By the summer of 1861 the American Civil War was well underway, and the resulting national conflict would bring major changes to Fort Humboldt. Federal soldiers were recalled to eastern battlefields and were replaced by units of the California Volunteers. These volunteers were drawn from local settlers who inaugurated a hard line and violent policy toward the native peoples.

During the Civil War, Fort Humboldt was the headquarters of the District of Humboldt (also termed the Humboldt Military District), which was part of the Department of the Pacific. The District's posts included Fort Bragg and Fort Wright in northern Mendocino County, and extending north through Humboldt County to Fort Gaston in Hoopa and Fort Ter-Waw near Klamath (after the Great Flood of 1862, moved to Camp Lincoln near Crescent City). Other posts included Camp Curtis (in Arcata), Camp Iaqua, Fort Seward (in southern Humboldt County), and Camps Baker, Lyon, and Anderson.

In 1863, a second hospital (replacing an earlier one) was built and is the only original building on the site today.

=== Final years and abandonment, 1865–1867 ===
The end of the Civil War brought more changes to Fort Humboldt. The California Volunteer units were disbanded in 1865, and U.S. regular troops returned to the fort from battlefields in the east. Six months after the surrender at Appomattox, the first Regular Army unit to return to Fort Humboldt was Company E, 9th Infantry Regiment, on November 8, 1865. Company E was one officer and 49 enlisted men.

The fort was staffed by 178 soldiers in October 1866. A month later, all forces, except one small detachment of soldiers, were withdrawn from Fort Humboldt. The fort became a sub-depot maintained primarily to provide supplies to Fort Gaston in Hoopa. Property belonging to the Quartermaster was auctioned on April 25, 1867. Items sold included 120 cords of wood, 2 boats with oars and sails, a heavy wagon, and an ambulance wagon.

On September 14, 1867, the last unit was withdrawn from Fort Humboldt and the post was abandoned, although the Humboldt County journalist Andrew Genzoli recorded that "January 1867 was the last Monthly Post Return for Fort Humboldt. Sergeant Antoine Schoneberger, Ordnance Sergeant, was on duty during the period 1866–1870."

The Humboldt Times reported the sale of other government property on August 10, 1870, including 32 buildings ($655) and 13 mules ($602).

=== Commanding officers ===
- Lieutenant Colonel Robert C. Buchanan, 4th Infantry Regiment, January 1853–February 1856
- 1st Lieutenant Francis H. Bates, 4th Infantry Regiment, February–June 1856
- Major Gabriel J. Rains, 4th Infantry Regiment, June 1856–July 1860
- Captain Charles Swain Lovell, 6th Infantry Regiment, July 1860–September 1861
- Colonel Francis J. Lippitt, 2nd Infantry Regiment, California Volunteers, January 9, 1862 – July 13, 1863
- Colonel Stephen G. Whipple, 1st Battalion California Volunteer Mountaineers, July 13, 1863 – February 6, 1864
- Colonel Henry M. Black, 6th Infantry Regiment, California Volunteers, February 6, 1864–June 1864
- Colonel Stephen G. Whipple, 1st Battalion California Volunteer Mountaineers, June 1864–June 14, 1865
- Major John C. Schmidt, 2nd Infantry Regiment, California Volunteers, June 15, 1865 – March 28, 1866
- Major Andrew W. Bowman, 9th Infantry Regiment, March 26, 1866–November 1866
- 1st Lieutenant J. Hewitt Smith, Company E, 2nd Artillery Regiment, November 1866–???? (commanding the Humboldt Depot)

=== Cemetery ===
Ten soldiers are known to have been buried at Fort Humboldt:

- John Blummer; C Co; 1st Battalion Mountaineers
- John Briel; 1840–1866; E Co, 2nd U.S. Artillery
- Patrick Carroll; 1838–1879; F Co, 4th California Infantry
- R.F. Clark
- Thomas R. Evans; died 1865; A Co; 1st Battalion Mountaineers
- J.D. Haskins
- John Henkin; 1834–1864
- Moses Hutchings; 1827–1865; F Co; 4th California Infantry
- Wilson Alexander Shaw; 1814–1864; A Co; 1st Battalion Mountaineers
- Cecil E. Winters; 1st Battalion Mountaineers

In May 1894, the remains of the U.S. soldiers buried near the site of Fort Humboldt were relocated to the Grand Army of the Republic plot in the Myrtle Grove cemetery in Eureka, California.

=== Cooper period, 1893–1928 ===
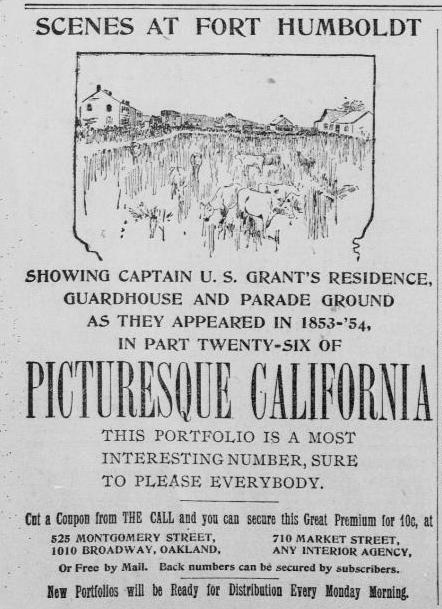
Advertisement, The Morning Call (San Francisco), September 1, 1894, p. 8

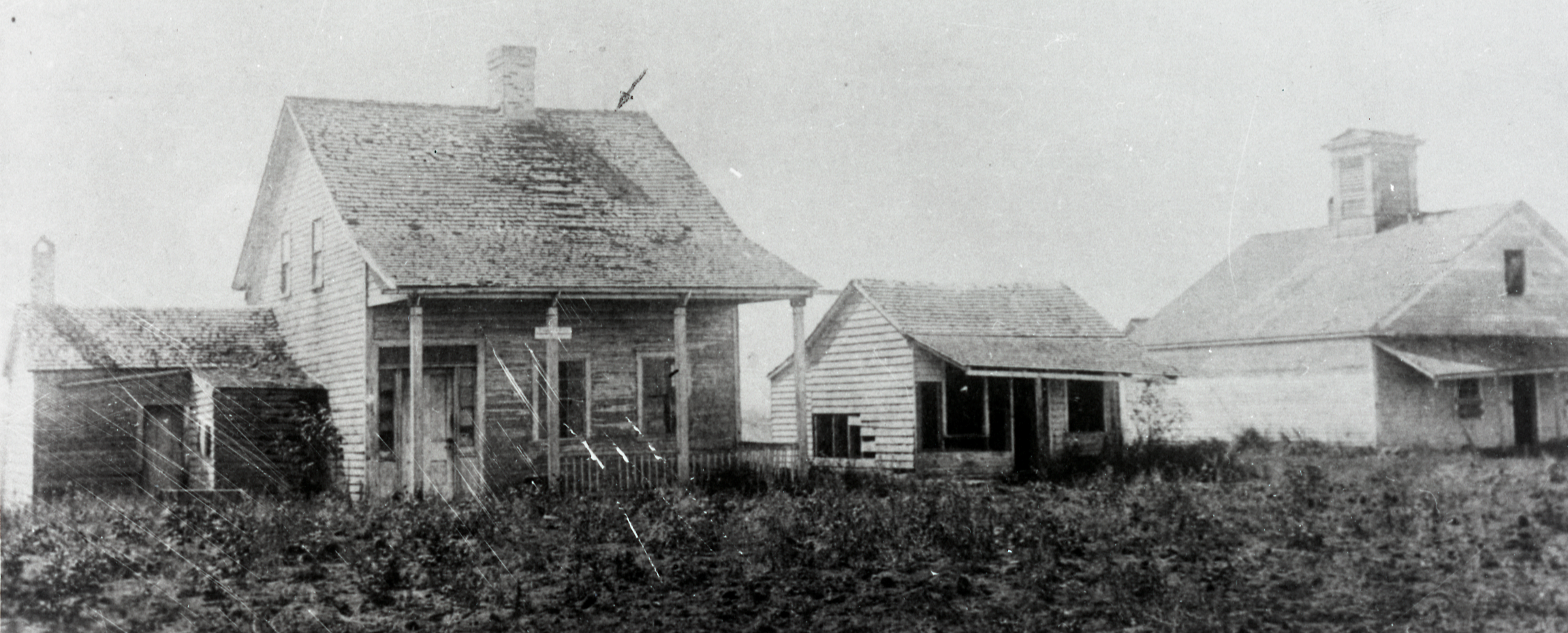
Abandoned buildings

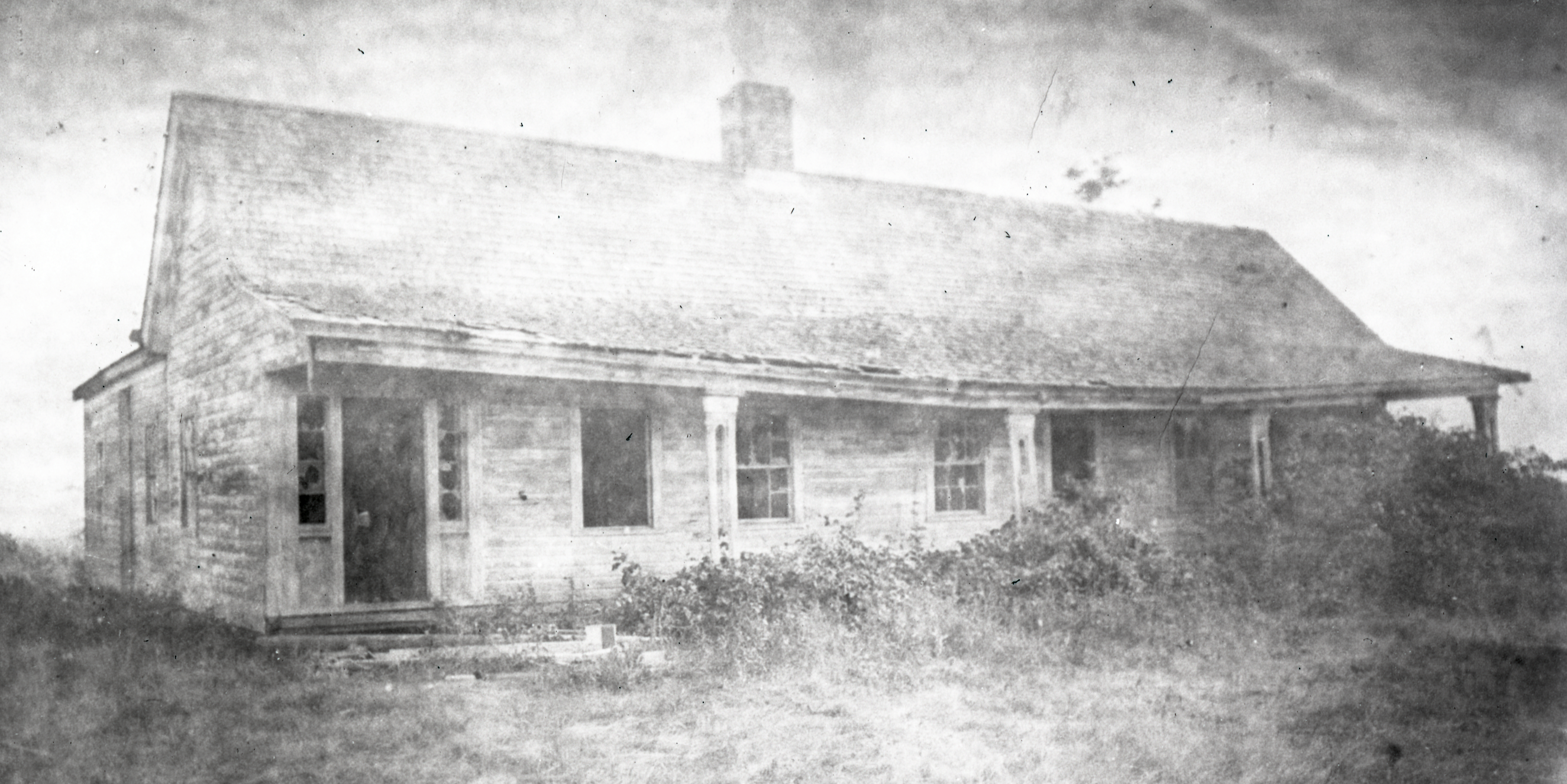
Abandoned building

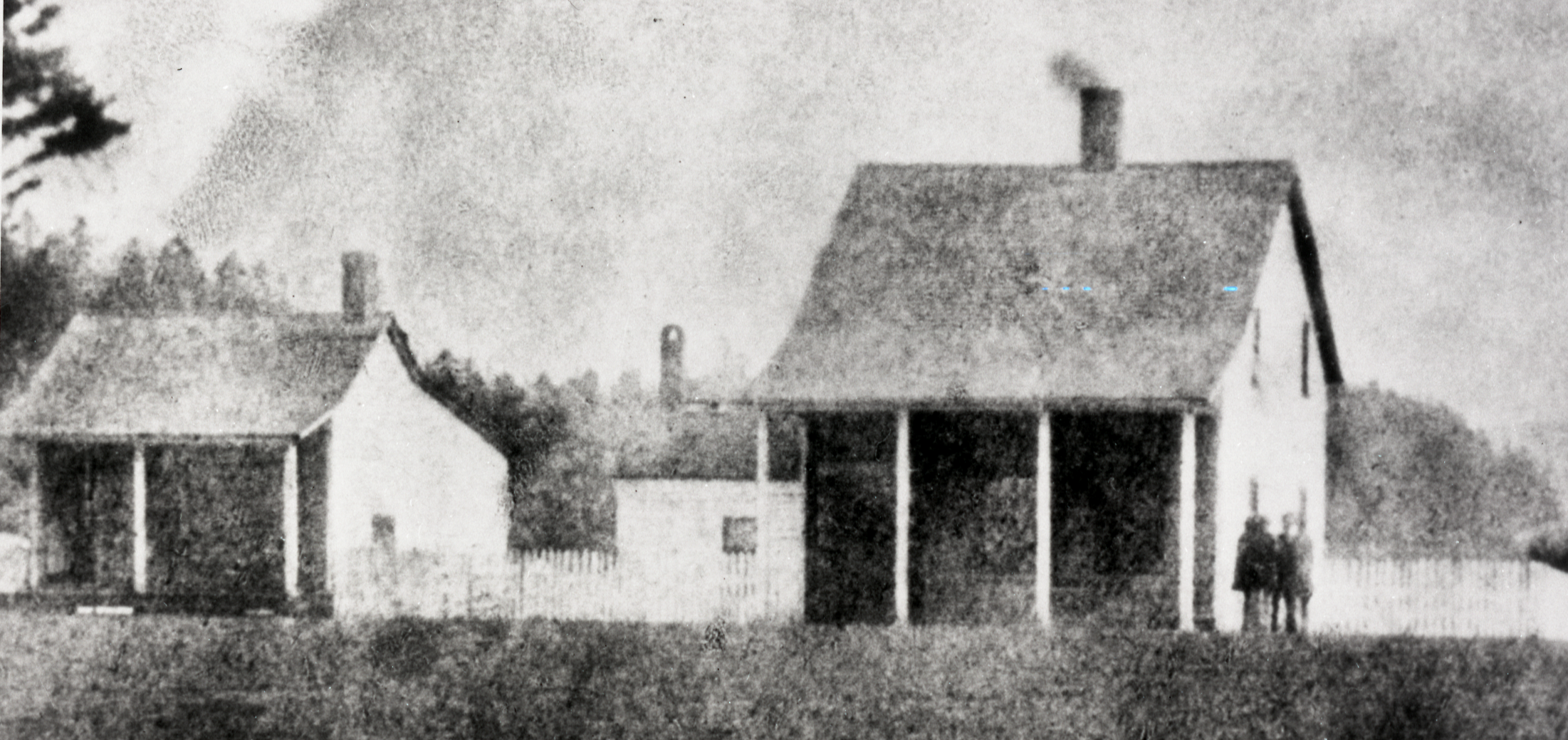
Abandoned buildings

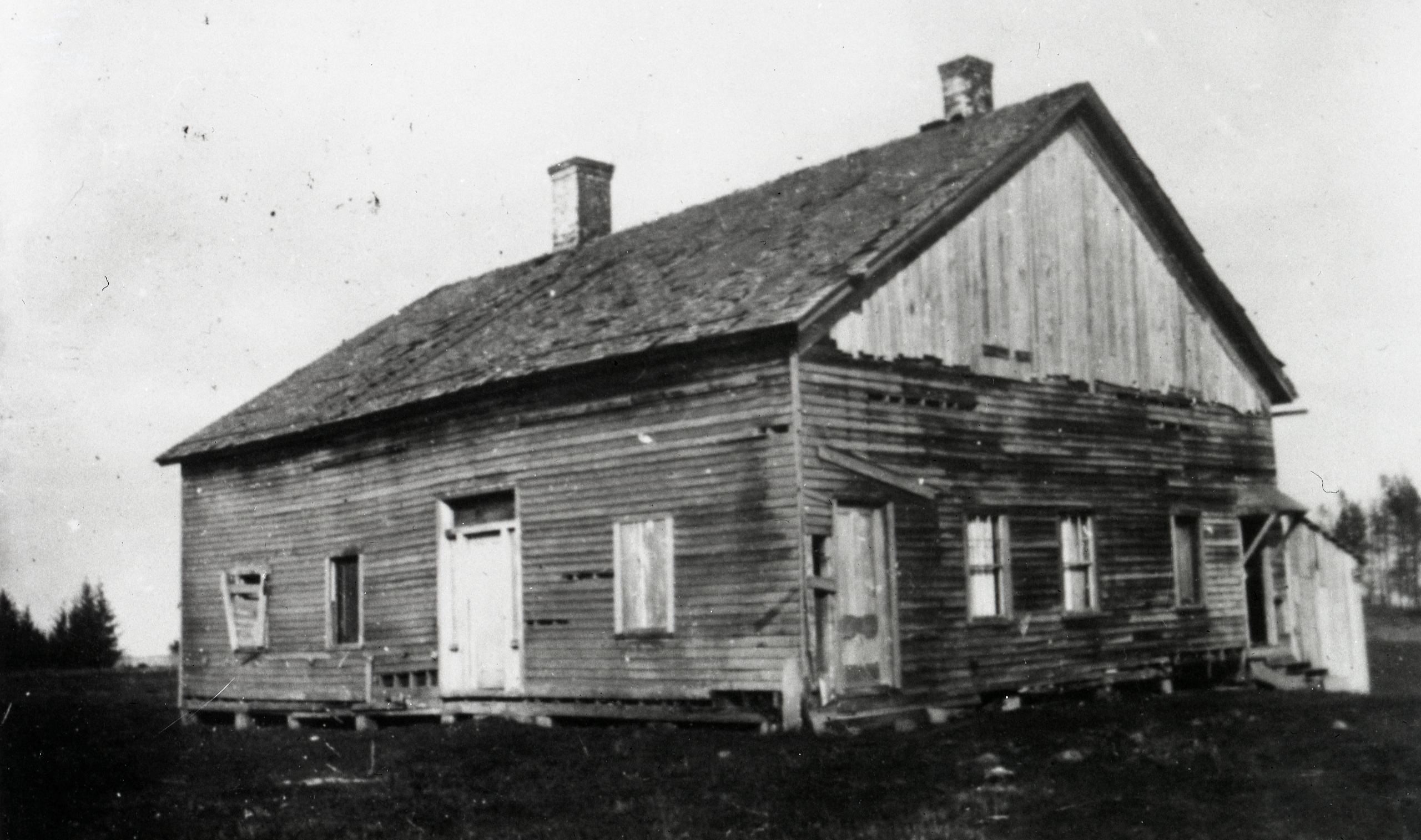
Abandoned hospital building

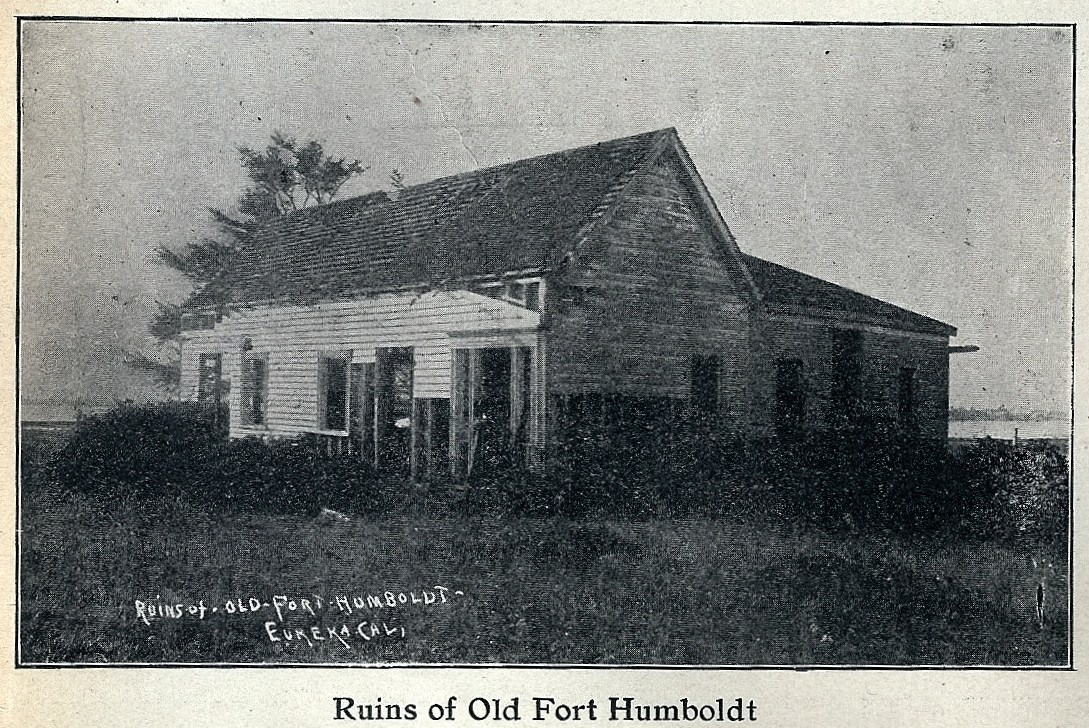
Abandoned building

After abandonment by the military, the lands were transferred to the Department of the Interior on April 6, 1870, and the fort fell into ruin. However, units of the California National Guard used the area one final time in August 1893. One hundred thirty-five soldiers from the Second Artillery Regiment, California National Guard, arrived in the Steamer Pomona on August 17, and marched through Eureka to Fort Humboldt.

In 1893, the land and its one remaining building were sold to W. S. Cooper. Cooper reportedly subdivided the property as soon as he acquired it, naming the new subdivision Fort Humboldt Heights. Cooper's daughter reported that on two occasions her father partially restored the remaining building as he realized its future importance.

In 1894 a sentry box from Fort Humboldt was exhibited at a fair in San Francisco. According to a newspaper article, "Among the Humboldt exhibits there is one which stirs the heart of every patriot and awakens memories of the nation's great captain. It is the original sentry-box of Fort Humboldt, here General Grant did duty when he was there."

The cavalry barn was razed by fire on October 21, 1895.

On February 7, 1925, the Daughters of the American Revolution placed a bronze plaque which reads, "Fort Humboldt. Occupied by U.S. troops from 1853 to 1865 [sic]. General U. S. Grant was stationed here in 1853." The plaque is still at the park, though hidden by trees. The tablet is bronze mounted on a huge rock blasted from Medicine Rock near Trinidad. The original plaque was stolen and was later replaced by the Daughters of the American Revolution.

In 1929, the "Fort Humboldt Post" of the American Legion spent several days restoring fort buildings.

The first wireless radio station in Humboldt County was located at Fort Humboldt. The United Wireless Telegraph Company began operating the station around 1900 with the call sign "PM Eureka." This was many years before Humboldt County had a "wired" telegraph which ran south to Petaluma. The Marconi Wireless Telegraph Company took over from 1911 to 1917, changing the call sign to "KPM". Also during this era the hospital building received some restoration.

Upon Cooper's death in 1928, his wife gave the land to the city of Eureka.

=== Restoration ===
According to one historian, "Mr. Cooper was aware of the importance of the lonely Fort. He spent $1,500 to restore the former hospital to a condition as near as possible to what it had been originally." Cooper eventually worked with California State Senator Selvage to pass a bill that would appropriate $32,000 for the State to purchase Fort Humboldt. However, the bid to purchase Fort Humboldt for the public met with local opposition.

For example, an editorial in the Blue Lake Advocate stated: "The whole scheme is a silly outburst of a maudlin sentimentalism which is simply ridiculous and is the laughing stock of the community. To take $32,000 from the taxpayer for the state to buy a few acres of land suitable only for a potato patch or a truck garden will be paying too much" (4 February 1906).

Public sentiment against the purchase won out, but the Cooper family continued to preserve the fort site until W.S. Cooper's death. At that time, his wife and daughter donated the land and the one remaining building to the City of Eureka. The City accepted the donation and the site was dedicated for use as a public park.

In the 1930s, local veteran organizations became interested in restoration of the fort. They took pictures that they sent to the National Archives in Washington, D.C. for plans and specifications of the fort, and began restoration of the area and development of a museum. The job turned out to be larger than they could do, and soon the Works Progress Administration was worked into the project.

Fort Humboldt was registered as a California Historical Landmark on January 11, 1935.

Also during the 1930s, the "Days of General Grant" was a four-day celebration centering on Independence Day. Local businesses made storefronts look like pioneer days. Male citizens grew beards, and both men and women dressed in 19th century clothing. The celebration repeated annually for four or five years. Prior to the fourth annual celebration in 1939, the Humboldt Standard newspaper wrote that, "it is an event which holds promise of becoming one of the lasting pioneer pageants of the West, comparable in importance to the Salinas Rodeo, the Pendleton Roundup, and the Portland Rose Festival."

By the 1940s the fort had become a Eureka city museum devoted to General Grant and local memorabilia. At some point, statues of General Grant and General Robert E. Lee (which were apparently made of wood) were placed in the park and were still there in 1947 as can be seen in the Shuster aerial photographs from that year.

In 1952 Robert Madsen was elected mayor of Eureka, and during his administration more headway was made toward actual restoration of the fort, as the city council showed interest in the project. Through informal meetings with the Humboldt County Board of Supervisors, the State Division of Beaches and Parks were approached to see if they were interested.

In the summer of 1952 representatives of the State attended a luncheon meeting held in Eureka and there stated they were interested in making the fort a state monument. They explained that they would eventually make an authentic restoration.

In 1955 the area was deeded to the State of California with the understanding that the state would reconstruct the historic buildings and interpret the settlement of the northern California coast. Ranger C. D. Thompson was the first Monument Supervisor and began living at the fort in 1956. He first remodeled the old building into an office for District One of the Division of Beaches and Parks. The office was headquarters for the District Supervisor, whose staff consisted of the Assistant District Supervisor, a secretary, the Ranger-Monument Supervisor, district carpenter foreman, district accounting technician, and possibly a landscape architect and a typist.

An archeological survey was conducted during the late 1950s by Donald Jewell and John Clemmer. The Timber Heritage Association's web site states that the present logging display at the park was established in 1962.

Fort Humboldt was designated a State Historic Park in 1963. The park seems to have been nominated to the National Register of Historic Places in September 1970 (NPS Reference # 70000927). Some restoration ensued, with the hospital the sole remaining building of the original construction. The General Plan, created in 1978, developed by California State Parks, calls for a re-creation of the entire fort complex. Although the Surgeon's Quarters was re-created in 1985, this General Plan has been slow to be implemented. Several archeological digs were also conducted during this period and a bronze plaque stating that the fort is California Historical Landmark #154 was placed near the parking lot about 1980. In 1986 exhibits were installed in the hospital to tell the story of the fort and the intercultural conflicts.

=== Late 20th century and a new millennium ===
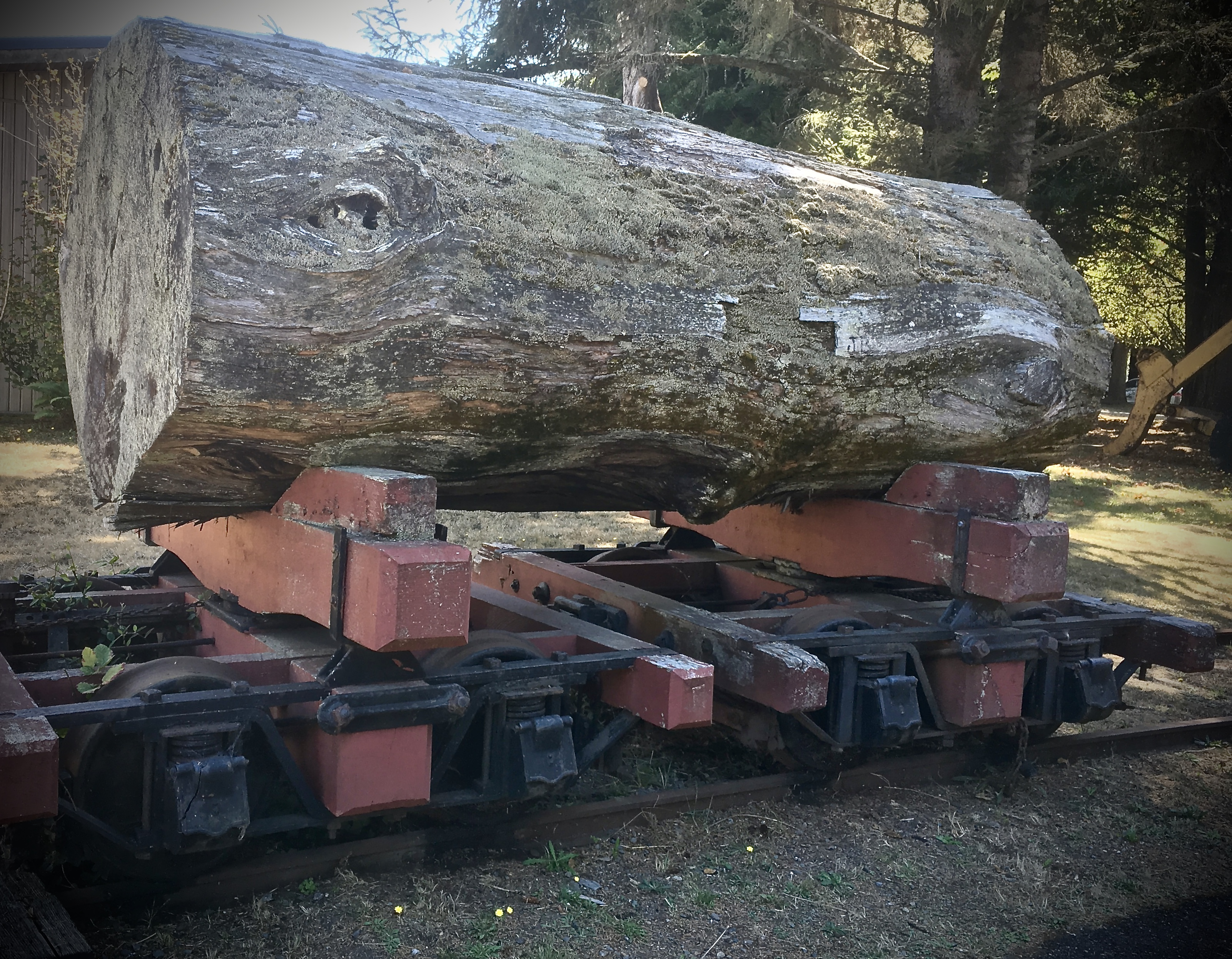
Redwood log loaded on an early 20th century flatbed railcar, historic logging outdoor museum

In more recent years, several Civil War re-enactments were held at the fort in the 1990s, but were moved to Fortuna in 1998. In 2000, students from the University of California Cooperative Extension Master Gardener Program planted a historic garden next to the hospital which contains medicinal, edible, and ornamental plants typically found in a 19th-century garden. This garden received a "Keep Eureka Beautiful" Award of Merit in 2001.

The park marked Fort Humboldt's 150th anniversary in January 2003. A color guard from Eureka High School's Naval Junior ROTC hoisted a replica American flag with 36 stars. The original flag that was first raised over the fort in 1853 was also on display. This flag was kept by the soldier (Private Joseph Snedden) who helped raise it. Snedden became a Humboldt County resident after he left the Army and eventually gave the flag to Mrs. Vera O'Conner-Berry. She, in turn, gave the flag to the Redwood Forest Chapter of the Daughters of the American Revolution in 1923. This organization started a preservation project in the 1990s to stabilize the flag, which is now kept by the Regent of the Redwood Forest Chapter.

In October 2008 permanent interpretive panels went on display in the nearby Bayshore Mall food court. The eight panels, part of a collaborative project between California State Parks and the North Coast Redwood Interpretive Association, explore the early frontier life of Fort Humboldt and Buck's Port, where the mall now stands.

In 2009 Fort Humboldt was one of 48 California state parks slated for closure due to the state's budget crisis. Due to public opposition, the closures were not carried out.

== Collections ==
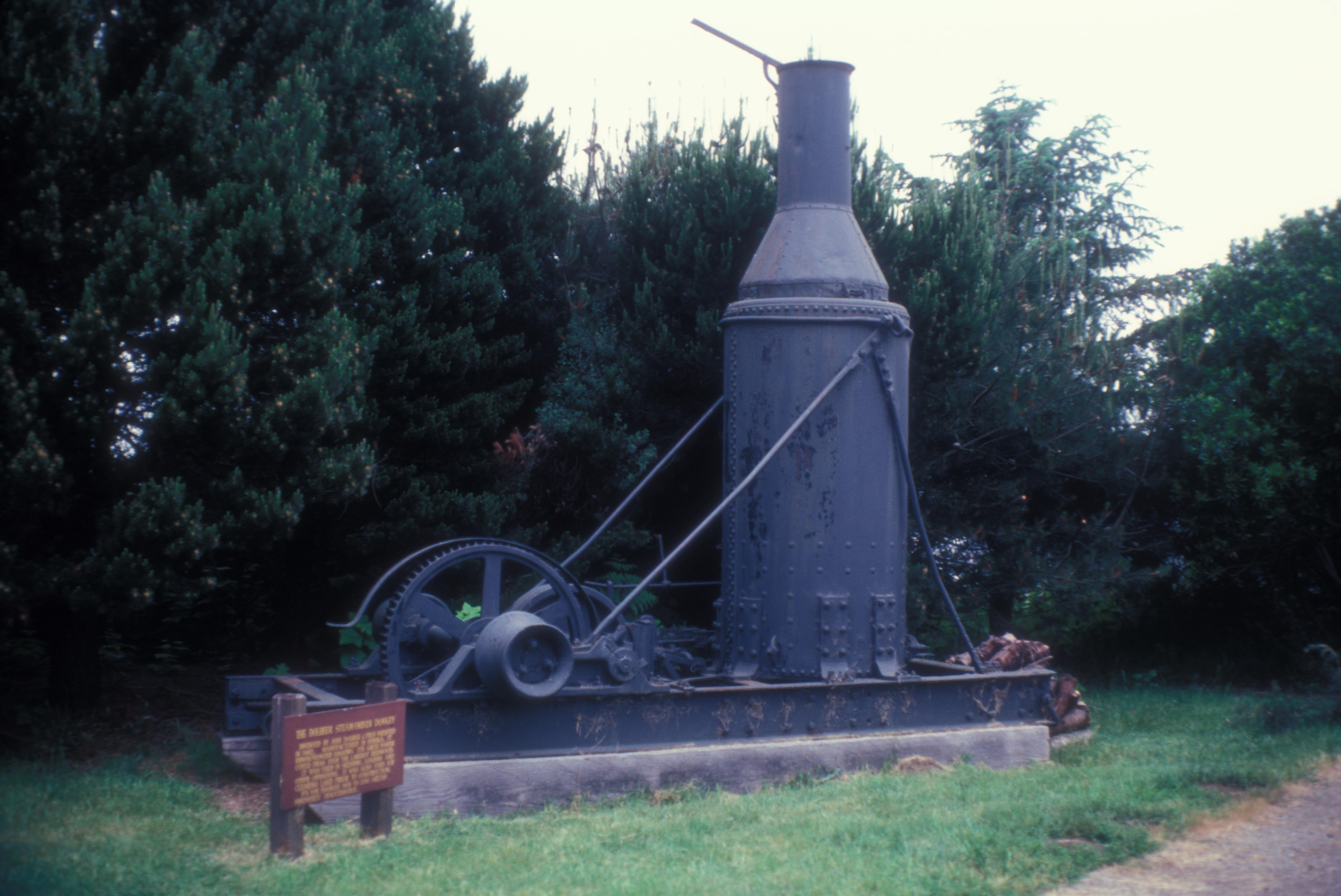
The steam donkey in the park

In addition to various displays of the trappings of military service and a vintage mountain howitzer cannon, the hospital building houses artifacts and particularly accounts (including extensive signage) of the Native American experience of European settlers. A culturally and historically correct dugout canoe constructed of heart redwood is displayed.

Though not directly related to the military history of the site, fully operational trains that operated on local standard gauge railroads in the early days of logging are present on the site. The logging equipment exhibit includes a Donkey engine. Invented in the 1880s by John Dolbeer of the local Dolbeer and Carson Lumber Company, the machine is included among other logging equipment showcasing advances over the 150 years of local logging history.

== Visitor information ==
Permanent displays are augmented by special events during the year. Of particular note are the prominent views of Humboldt Bay, the Samoa peninsula, and portions of Eureka from the bluff occupied by the park and structures. The park entrance is located one block off U.S. Route 101 near the Bayshore Mall in Eureka.

== See also ==
- List of California state parks
- List of museums in the North Coast (California)
- Clarke Historical Museum
- Humboldt Bay Maritime Museum
- Humboldt County Historical Society
- 1860 Wiyot massacre

== Additional references ==
- Bledsoe, Anthony J, Indian Wars of the Northwest: A California Sketch, Bacon and Company, 1885.
- Humboldt Historian, "The 'Days of General Grant' Recalled," Humboldt County Historical Society, July–August 1977, p. 3.
- Kyle, Douglas E. (ed.), Historic Spots in California, 4th edition, Stanford University Press, 1990.
- United States Department of War, Report of the Secretary of War, Government Printing Office, 1867.
- State of California, Department of Parks and Recreation, Fort Humboldt State Historic Park: Resource Management Plan, General Development Plan, and Environmental Impact Plan, August 1978.
