= Lone Star, Humboldt County, California =

Human settlement in Humboldt county, California

Coordinates: 40.6497°N 123.8672°W

Lone Star is a former settlement in Humboldt County, California, United States.

As of 1873, a school was in operation at Lone Star. It was later amalgamated with the Kneeland School.
