= Fort Gaston =

Coordinates: 41°03′01″N 123°40′27″W

Fort Gaston
- Camp Gaston
- Near Hoopa Valley, California in United States

Site information
- Type: Fort
- Owner: United States Army

Location
- Area: 54 acres (21.85 ha)

Site history
- Built: 1859
- Fate: Abandoned 1892

Garrison information
- Past commanders: Captain Edmund Underwood
- Occupants: Company D, 3rd Regiment California Volunteer Infantry; Company K, H, F, I 2nd Regiment California Volunteer Infantry; Company B, C 1st Battalion California Volunteer Mountaineers; Company A, 1st Battalion of Native Cavalry, California Volunteers

Fort Gaston was founded on December 4, 1859, in the redwood forests of the Hoopa Valley, in Northern California, on the west bank of the Trinity River, 14 miles (23 km) from where the Trinity flows into the Klamath River. It was located in what is now the Hoopa Valley Indian Reservation. Fort Gaston as part of the Humboldt Military District was intended to control the Hupa Indians and to protect them from hostile white settlers. The post was named for 2nd Lieutenant William Gaston, of the First Dragoons, who had been killed May 17, 1858, during the Spokane–Coeur d'Alene–Paloos War.

Fort Gaston, from 1866 to 1867 officially designated as Camp Gaston, is not to be confused with Camp Gaston, on the Colorado River (sometimes erroneously called Fort Gaston). That Camp Gaston was also named after 2nd Lt. William Gaston and was founded as an advance base in April 1859 near Palo Verde, California, during the Mohave War.

== History ==
In 1858, a Yurok agent overheard some men in a saloon talking about a large group of armed men that were moving downriver from Weaverville, California towards the Hupa lands to exterminate them. He was able to turn them back that time but the Hupa worried about their safety and began gathering their own weapons while petitioning for a fort as well. Founded in December 1859, and first manned by Captain Edmund Underwood and 56 men from a company of the 4th US Infantry Regiment, Fort Gaston from the beginning was to keep an eye on the Hupa who were suspected of aiding surrounding tribes in attacks on white settlers, ambushes of mail carriers and of stages in what was called the Bald Hills War. The Hupa denied aiding their neighbors but resisted providing guides to the army until 1862. However they never seemed to catch the enemy, and were in fact secretly warning them.

In 1861, the district commander proposed to his superiors a gathering of all the local Indians at Fort Gaston to stage a demonstration of drilling and firepower that would convince them to end hostilities. The idea failed when he said he required six companies of infantry for the demonstration. At the time regular troops were being pulled from the forts in California to participate in the Civil War.

Fort Gaston's commander protested the transfer of any more men because it might have dire consequences. he claimed the local settlers would abandon the valley despite building a blockhouse, if any more troops were withdrawn.

In the place of the withdrawn regulars, Company D, 3rd Regiment California Volunteer Infantry was sent to Fort Gaston October, 1861, operating against Indians until ordered to San Francisco August 23, 1862. They were involved in a skirmish at Light Prairie, near Arcata, August 21, 1862.

Company K, 2nd Regiment California Volunteer Infantry was ordered to Fort Gaston December 1861, and served there until June 1863. Company K was in action, at Weaversville Crossing, on the Mad River, July 2, 1862 and near Oak Camp April 30, 1863.

Company H, 2nd Regiment California Volunteer Infantry moved to Fort Gaston April 20, 1862 but returned to Fort Humboldt July 1862.

Company F, 2nd Regiment California Volunteer Infantry was ordered to garrison Fort Gaston from September to November 1862. They were involved in a skirmish at Redwood September 8, 1862.

Company I, 2nd Regiment California Volunteer Infantry from April 20, 1862, joined the Fort Gaston garrison, also serving there until June 1863. Company I was in action, at the skirmish at Fort Gaston August 6, 1862 and the affair at Little River August 23, 1862.

From June 1863, companies B and C of the 1st Battalion California Volunteer Mountaineers relieved 2nd Regiment as garrison of Fort Gaston. Company D later reinforced them. These units were involved in various skirmishes during 1863, at Oak Camp June 6, Thomas' Ranch November 12, Trinity River November 13 and Willow Creek November 17.

On December 25, 1863, a battle with the Indians took place near Fort Gaston. The Indians holed up in several log buildings, firing at companies B and C of the mountaineers from rifle ports. Attempting to drive them out the army attacked them with howitzers. At nightfall, with the buildings in ruins, the Indians were able to escape in the darkness.

The mountaineers continued operating against Indians in 1864, Company B in a skirmish near Boynton's Prairie May 6, 1864. Company C, at the Thomas House, on the Trinity River, May 27, 1864, and in operations in the Trinity Valley September 1-December 3, 1864. The mountaineer companies held the fort until June 1865.

Company A, 1st Battalion of Native Cavalry, California Volunteers ordered to Humboldt District December 26, 1863. Arrived there January 12, 1864 serving at Fort Gaston until March 6, 1864.

Peace was finally signed with the Hupa Indians on August 12, 1864.

Company B, 4th Regiment California Volunteer Infantry was ordered to Fort Humboldt April 5, 1865 to replace the mountaineer garrison and served there until mustered out April 18, 1866.

Renamed Camp Gaston in January 1866 it was again redesignated Fort Gaston in April 1867. It was finally abandoned in June 1892, and was turned over the Department of the Interior and became part of the Hupa reservation.

== Fort Gaston fish hatchery ==
In 1889, the United States Fish Commission built a salmon hatchery at Fort Gaston; the station was abandoned in 1898 due to its inaccessibility.
