= Francis J. Lippitt =

United States Army general

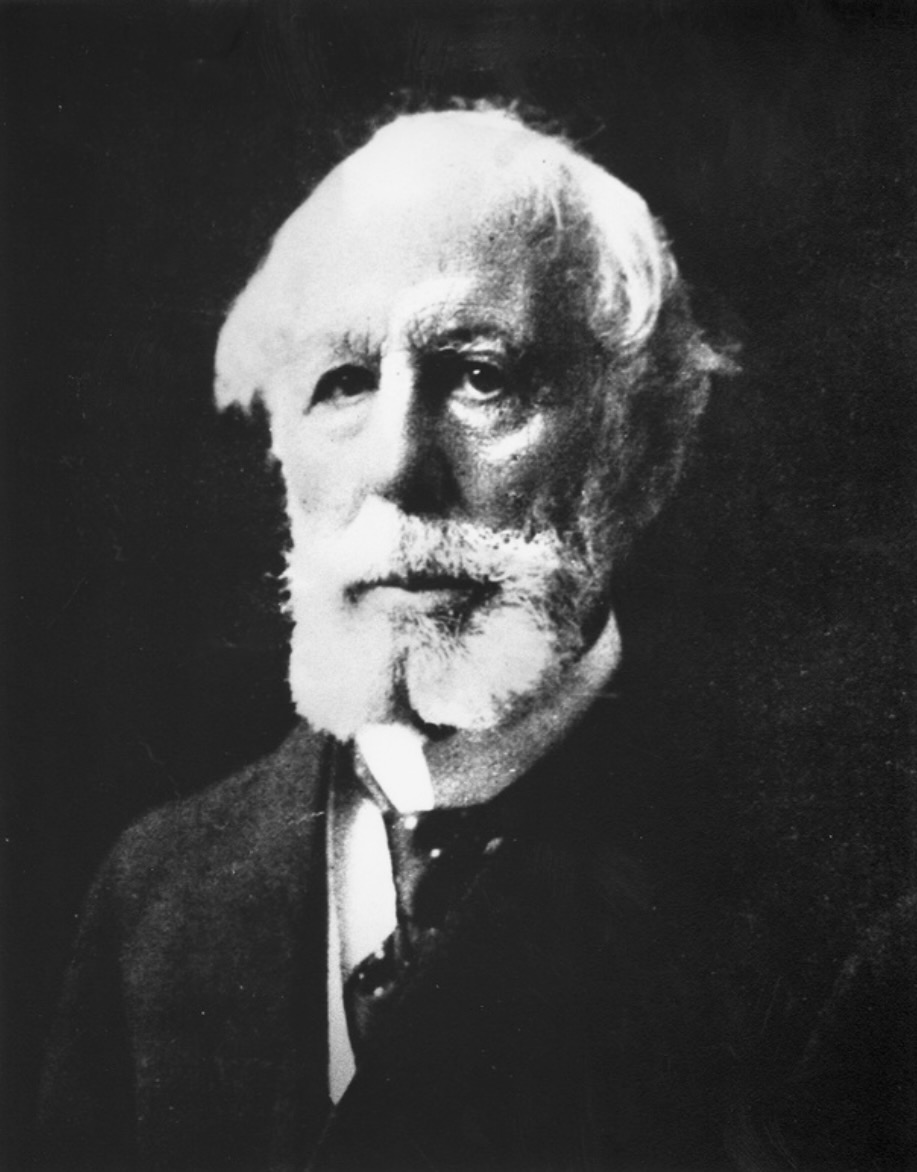
- Portrait of Francis J. Lippitt
- Born: Francis James Lippitt; July 19, 1812; Providence, Rhode Island
- Died: September 27, 1902 (aged 90); Washington, D.C., US
- Military career
- Allegiance: United States
- Branch: Army
- Rank: Brigadier General

Francis James Lippitt (July 19, 1812 – September 27, 1902) was an American lawyer and veteran of the Mexican–American War, the Bald Hills War and the American Civil War. For the later he was made a brevet brigadier general.

== Early life ==
Lippitt was born in Providence, Rhode Island, on July 19, 1812. After graduating from Brown University, Lippitt, who could speak and read French fluently, was hired by Alexis de Tocqueville to read the American pamphlets that he had collected during his visit to the United States and summarize them in French.

== To California with the New York Regiment ==
In 1846 Lippitt was made a captain of Stevenson's 1st Regiment of New York Volunteers for service in California and during the war with Mexico during the Mexican War. In 1847. he served as captain commanding the garrison in Santa Barbara, California. After mustering out in 1848, he remained in the territory and was afterwards a member of the California Constitutional Convention, held in Monterey, California in 1849.

== Civil War and the Bald Hills War ==
In 1861 Lippitt raised the 2nd California Infantry Regiment and served as its colonel. As such he was made the first commander of the Humboldt Military District between January 9, 1862 and July 13, 1863. He was tasked with prosecuting the Bald Hills War against the Indians in the counties of northwestern California. Under his command several posts were established as bases for operations against the Indians and for the defense of the settlers. He was relieved on July 13, 1863 by Lieutenant Colonel Stephen G. Whipple of the 1st Battalion California Volunteer Mountaineers, who advocated a more active prosecution of the war with men used to the hardships of war in the redwood forests. Colonel Lippitt and his regimental headquarters was transferred to Benicia Barracks, July 20, 1863, and from there to Fort Miller, Fresno County, California, August 11, 1863, where they were stationed until October 1, 1864. They returned to the Presidio of San Francisco, October 9, 1864. There during the month of October 1864, Colonel Lippitt was mustered out with men of his regiment who had completed their terms of enlistment. He was made brevet brigadier general, March 13, 1865, for faithful service during the war.

== Later life ==
Following the civil War, General Lippitt wrote four military books, A Treatise on the Tactical Use of The Three Arms, Infantry, Artillery, and Cavalry in 1865, A treatise on intrenchments in 1866, The Special Operations of War: comprising the forcing and defence of defiles; the forcing and defence of rivers in retreat; the attack and defence of open towns and villages; the conduct of detachments for special purposes; and notes on tactical operations in sieges in 1868, and Field service in war: Comprising marches, camps and cantonments, outposts, convoys, reconnaissances, foraging, and notes on logistics in 1869.

He became interested in spiritualism and wrote Physical Proofs of Another Life in 1888. In 1902 he published his autobiography, Reminiscences of Francis J. Lippitt, written for his family, his near relatives and intimate friends.

== Death ==
Lippitt died on September 27, 1902, in Washington, D.C., at the age of 90, and was buried in Brooklyn, New York.

== See also ==
- List of American Civil War brevet generals (Union)
