= Camp Grant, California =

Ghost town in California, US

Coordinates: 40°20′35.08″N 123°53′9.44″W

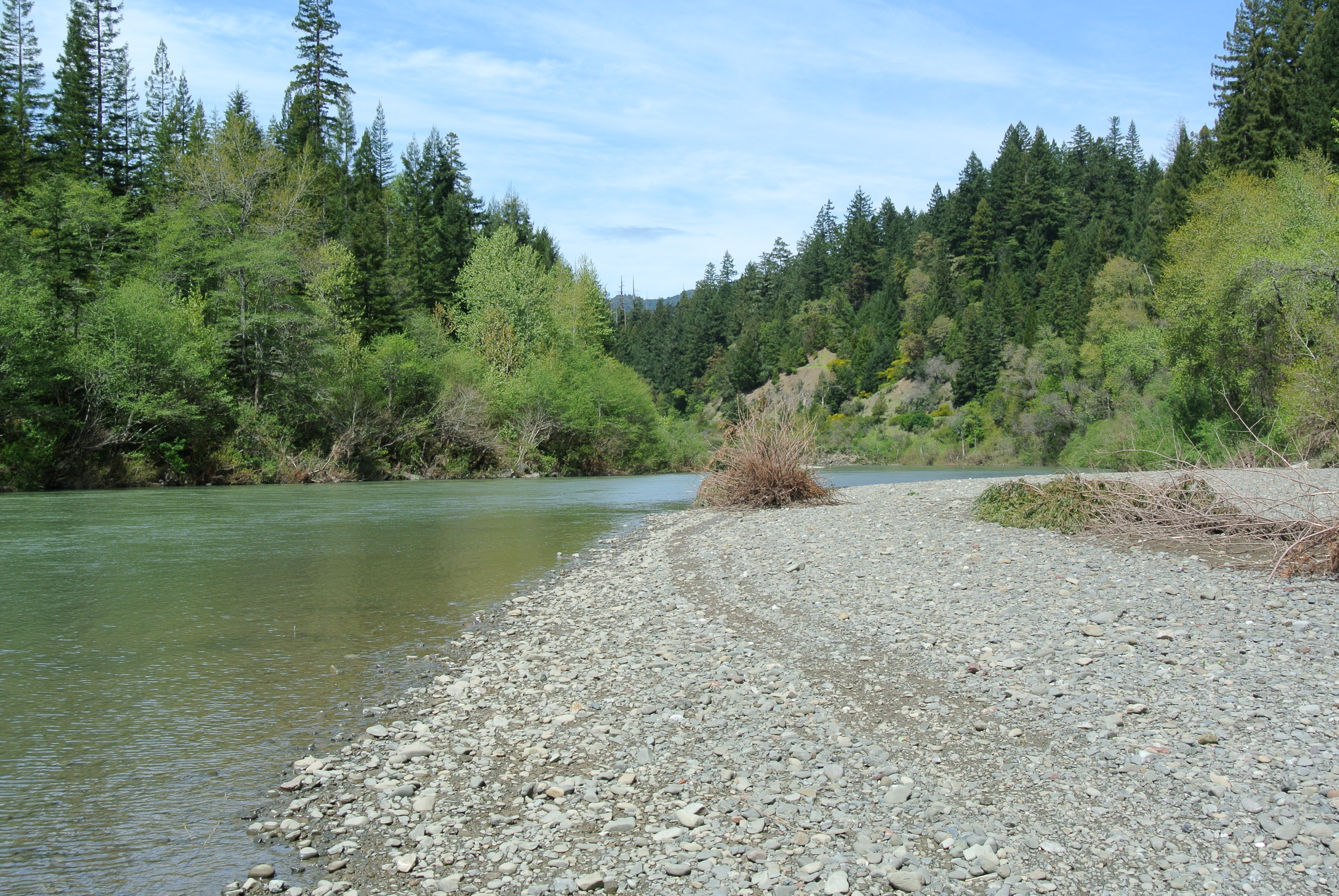
Along the South Fork of the Eel River near Camp Grant

Camp Grant is a ghost town in Humboldt County, California, United States, located on the South Fork Eel River, 2 miles (3.2 km) northeast of Weott and 3 miles (4.8 km) east of Dyerville. It was originally settled by Northern Sinkyone people, followed by a Union Army camp and later a logging and railroad support settlement for the construction of the Northwestern Pacific Railroad.

== History ==
The area was formerly inhabited by Northern Sinkyone people whose main village, named IlhtcuntaHduñ (also Ltcuntdun) was 3 miles (4.8 km) downstream at the confluence of Bull Creek, later named Dyerville.

In early 1850, half of the Josiah Gregg expedition, including Lewis K. Wood who would later found Arcata, California, passed through on local trails seeking their way back to San Francisco. The other half, including the dying Gregg, had tried to follow the coast road and failed. They left the Lost Coast along Bull Creek from about the present day location of Honeydew, California and passed this area on trails on their way to Clearlake although their exact route after leaving this area is unknown.

The rush of Euro-American settlers followed immediately north on the traditional, strenuous trails over Island Mountain, now Bell Springs Road. Settlers bound for Eureka passed Camp Grant on their way north from the intersection of present-day U.S. Highway 101 and Cummings Creek, south of Leggett. This migration of Euro/Americans through an area without the resources to support the increase in population led to disease, conflict and starvation for the Sinkyone.

Indian Agent Redick McKee's 1851 expedition brought a rush of homestead filings. Native groups militated against this. The resulting conflicts led to the establishment of organized vigilante committees such as the Volunteer Company of Dragoons and continued through at least the 1870s.

=== Bald Hills War ===
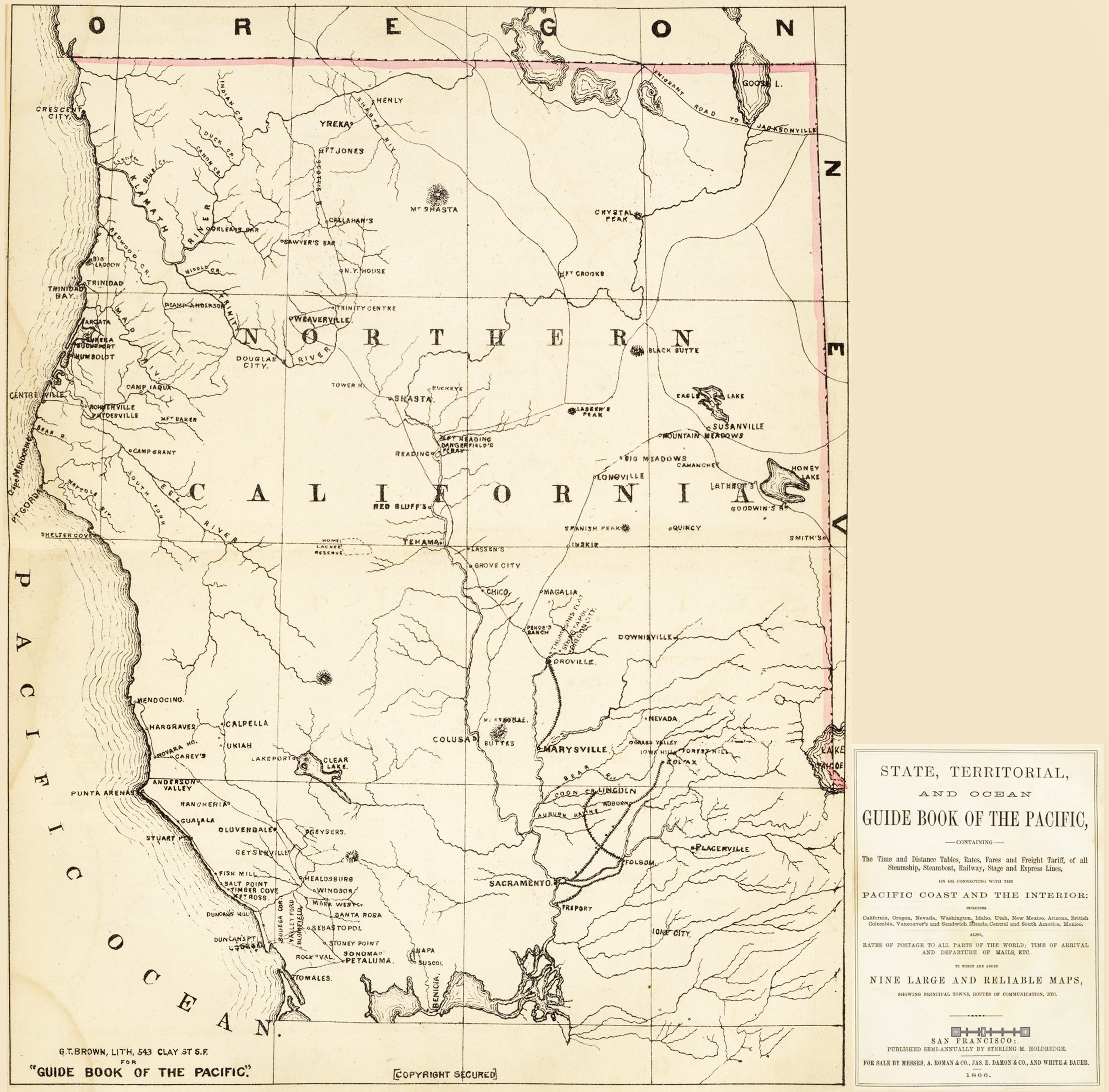
Camp Grant, on a line east from Cape Mendocino, on an 1866 map

The Bald Hills War against the local Indians was waged during the American Civil War. Camp Grant was established on the Eel River, 3 miles (4.8 km) east of the confluence of the South Fork of the Eel with Bull Creek, in October 1863.

Camp Grant was commanded by Captain John Y. Simpson with Company E, 1st Battalion of Mountaineers, California Volunteers as its garrison. Simpson and Company E were involved in several skirmishes: Skirmish at Grouse Creek May 23, 1864; a Skirmish at Matole May 26, 1864; Skirmish at Big Flat May 28, 1864; Expedition to North Fork Eel River September 1–29, 1864.

During these operations they captured 166 Native Americans (referred to as "hostiles") and sent them to the Round Valley Reservation in 1864. In August 1864 the Bald Hills War ended and Company E was mustered out at Fort Humboldt on June 14, 1865. Camp Grant was abandoned shortly thereafter.

=== Settlement ===
The location remained as a settlement; a post office operated at Camp Grant from 1868 to 1895. In the 20th century, many private owners in the area sold their land to the Humboldt Redwoods State Park. The area is now considered a part of Weott.
