= Iaqua, California =

Former settlement in Humboldt County, California

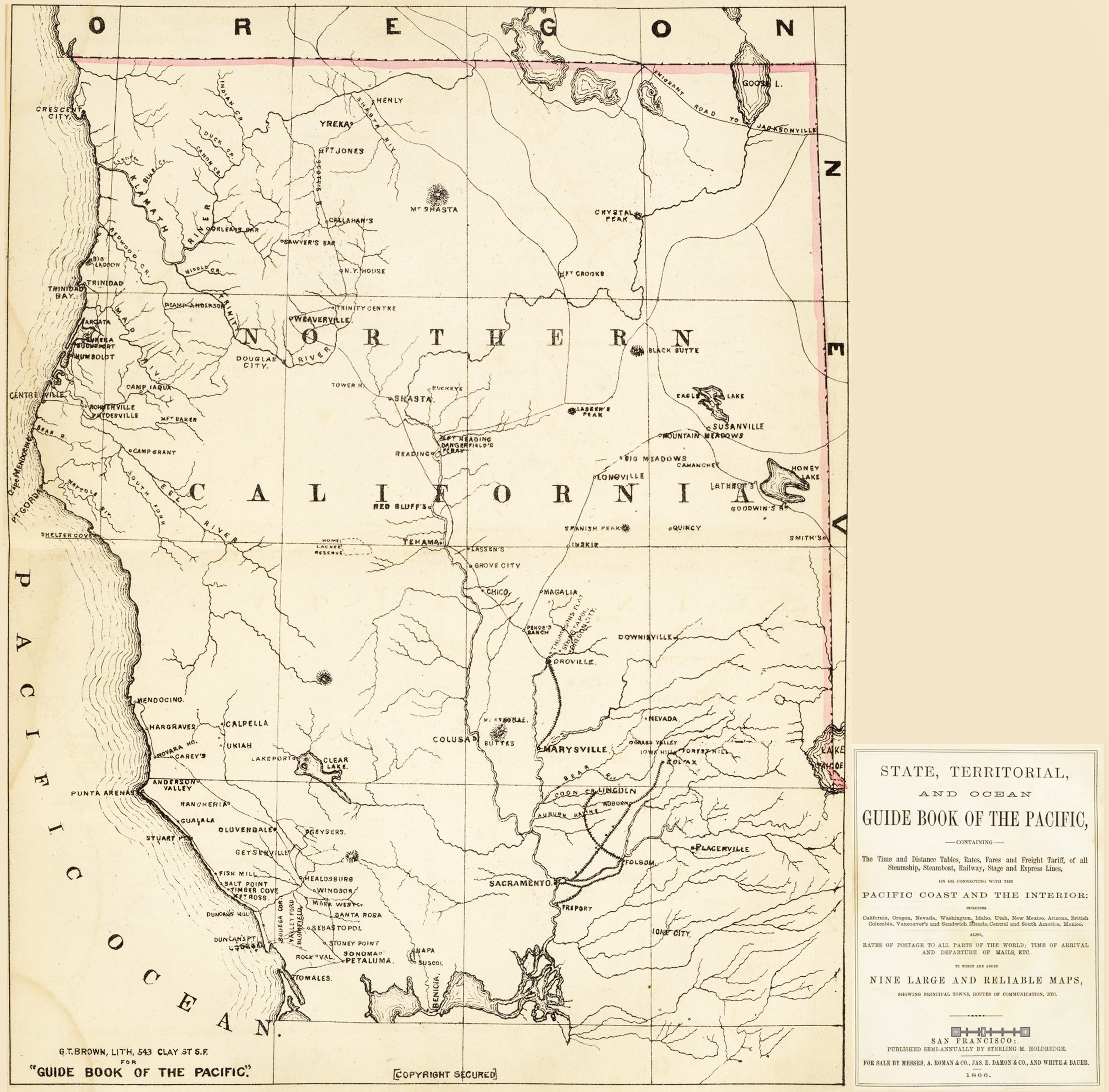
Iaqua - follow a line east from Centerville - on an 1866 map

Iaqua (also, Jaqua) is a former settlement in Humboldt County, California, United States. It was located 5.5 miles (8.9 km) south of Kneeland.

Camp or Fort Iaqua, a military post operational from August 5, 1863 to 1866 was located on Yeager Creek, about 18 miles east of the mouth of the Eel River, is located on Iaqua Creek 4 miles (6.4 km) south-southeast of Iaqua.

The Jaqua post office opened in 1880, and changed its name to Iaqua later that year. The post office closed in 1903, re-opened in 1909, and closed for good in 1920.

As of 1873, a school was in operation at Iaqua. It later merged with the Kneeland School.
