= Camp Curtis =

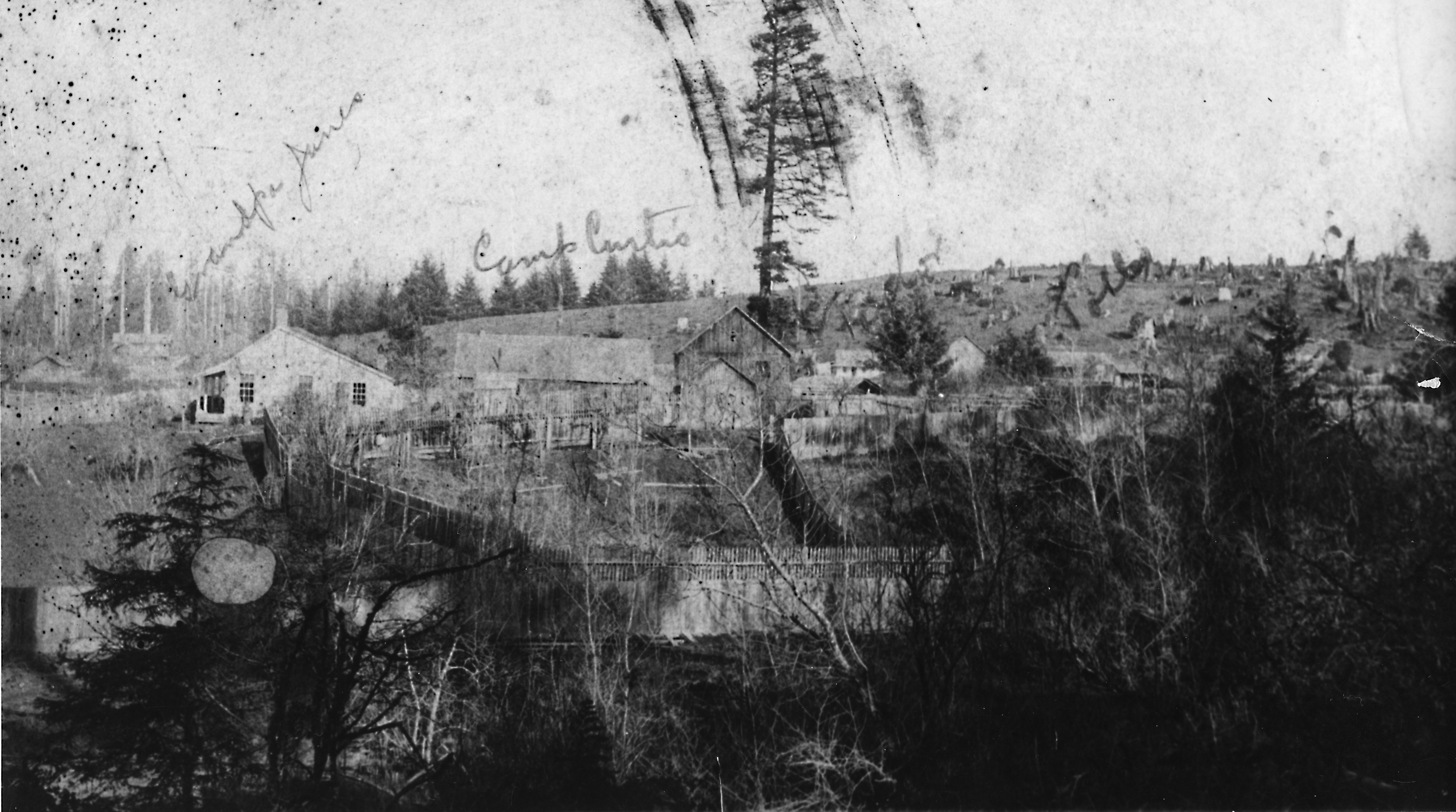
- Camp Curtis
- Interactive map of Camp Curtis
- Location: Humboldt County, California, United States
- Nearest city: Arcata, California
- Coordinates: 40°53′27.74″N 124°4′46.47″W
- Established: 1921
- Governing body: California Historical Landmarks

California Historical Landmark
- Reference no.: 215

Camp Curtis, California State Historic Landmark #215, was located about one mile north of Arcata, California, and served as the headquarters and garrison of the 1st Battalion California Volunteer Mountaineers from 1862 to 1865.

Before Camp Curtis, an older "Camp on Janes' Farm," was situated on a rise above Arcata and used by California Militia volunteers as early as 1858 during the local "Indian Wars."

Arcata was a trans-shipment point from boats to pack trains for interior mines. In the early 1860s, a ferry was maintained where the main road crossed the Mad River (California) at Essex. In early June 1862, the ferry operator and his family were attacked. An older woman was killed and a younger woman injured by bullets, two men drowned while fleeing the attack, but the ferryman and three children survived uninjured. The injured woman claimed she saw at least one white man painted to look like an Indian.

In 1862, Captain Owsley arrived, establishing the official Camp Curtis on the same site as the volunteer camp. He and a party of 30 to 40 soldiers were charged with "preventing the murder by Indians of any more citizens in that vicinity."

== Historical marker ==
A bronze tablet in a bus turnaround marks the location of Camp Curtis. Placed 5 October 1930 reads "Camp Curtis 1862–1865 – In memory of Co. E & I 2nd. California Volunteer Infantry 1862–1863 – Co. B 1st. Battalion Mountaineers Volunteer Infantry 1863–1864 – Co. A 1st. Battalion Native California Volunteer Cavalry 1864 – And Marie Brizard Todd A Pioneer of 1847 – Erected by the Pioneer Society of Humboldt County."

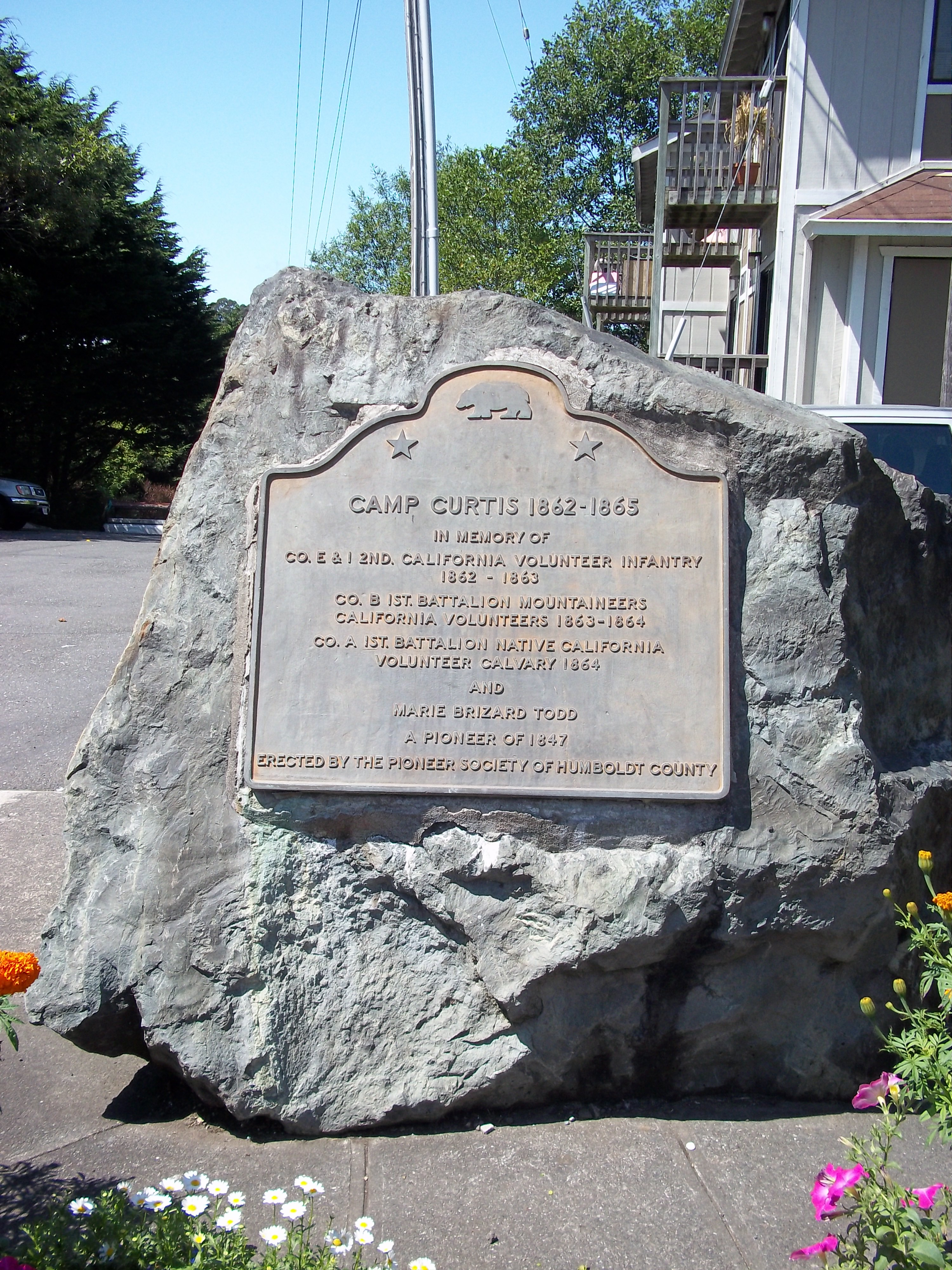
Camp Curtis Marker
