= California Indian Wars =

Series of battles and massacres, 1850–1880

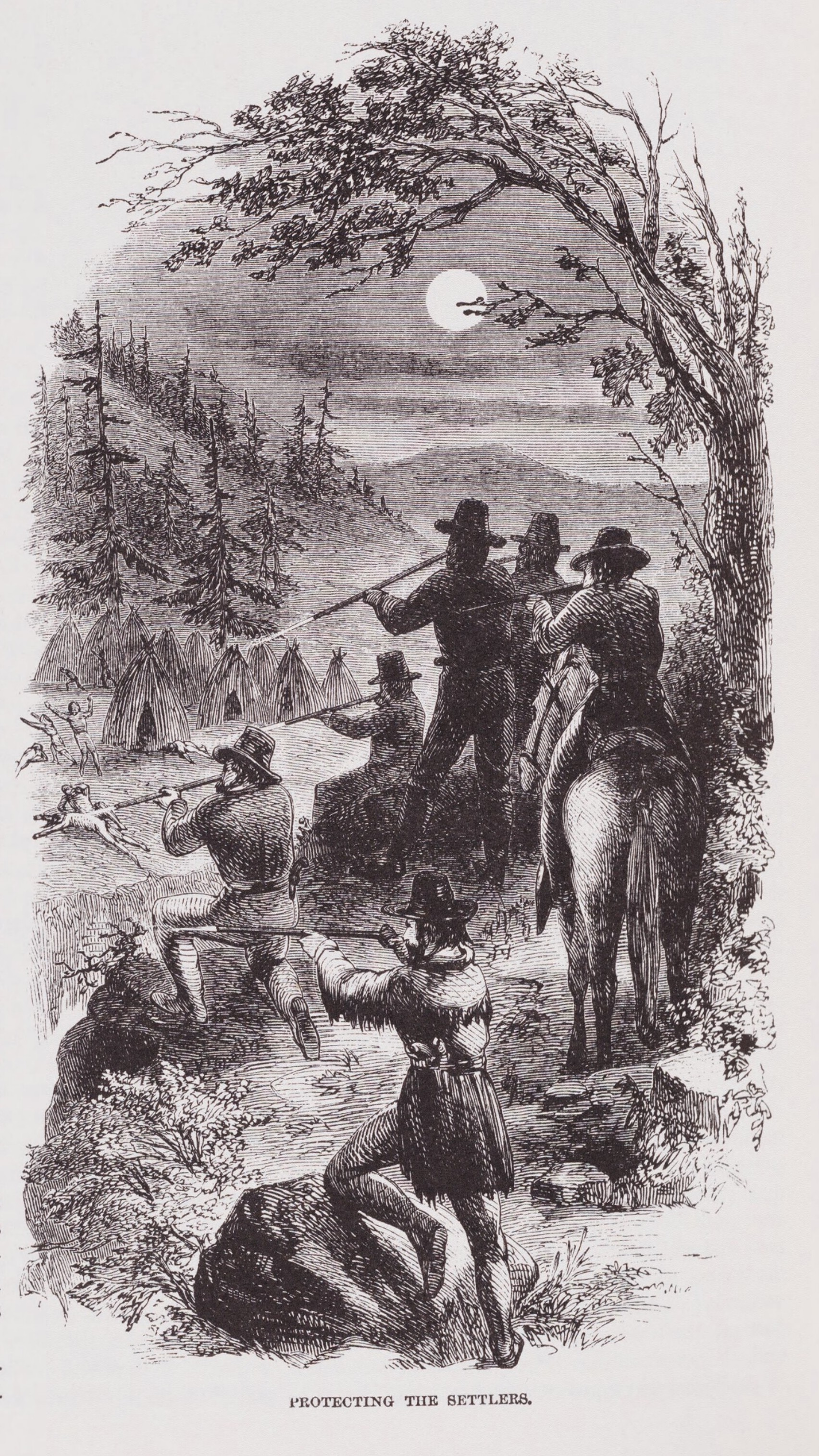
- "Protecting The Settlers", illustration by J. R. Browne in The Indians Of California, 1864
Date	1846–1880
Location	California
Result	California and United States victory: California genocide

Belligerents
United States; California Republic	Mono; Shoshone; Kawaiisu; Tübatulabal; Whilkut; Other Indigenous nations

The California Indian Wars were a series of wars, battles, and massacres between the United States Army (or often the California State Militia, especially during the early 1850s), and the Indigenous peoples of California. The wars lasted from 1846, immediately after Alta California, acquired during the Mexican–American War, became the state of California, to 1880 when the last minor military operation on the Colorado River ended the Calloway Affair of 1880. The California genocide took place during these wars.

Following the acquisition of the Mexican Cession in the Treaty of Guadalupe Hidalgo that ended the Mexican–American War, the small Federal garrison west of the Rocky Mountains was spread out over that vast territory. Shortly afterward, the economic effects of the California Gold Rush encouraged desertions that further weakened the garrisons within the territory of California. Following statehood, the California State Militia engaged in most of the early conflicts with the Indians within its boundaries before the American Civil War. The state sought compensation from the United States federal government for the cost of the operations and for the "depredations" of the Indians, claims that would not be settled for decades. Often, a number of miners or other settlers, who were impatient at the bureaucratic delay or political opposition involved with organizing militia companies, organized themselves to violently engage local Indian tribes, at times murdering several of its members, indiscriminately.

Later during the American Civil War, California and Oregon State Volunteers replaced Federal troops west of the Rocky Mountains and engaged in many conflicts with the Indians in that region including in California, Nevada and Utah, New Mexico and Arizona Territories. Within California they fought in the ongoing 1858–1864 Bald Hills War and in the 1862–1863 Owens Valley Indian War. Minor skirmishes occurred between local militias or volunteers and the Yahi, Yana and Paiute in northeastern California into the 1870s. Following the Civil War, most hostilities in California were over except for a few minor skirmishes in the Owens Valley and in the Mojave Desert against the Timbisha and Chemehuevi. Federal troops replaced the volunteers between late 1865 and early 1866 and again engaged in military actions in the remote regions of the Mojave Desert, Owens Valley and the northeast of the state against the Snakes and later the Modoc in the next two decades.

== List of California Indian Wars, massacres, battles, skirmishes and events ==
=== 1850–1858 ===
- Act for the Government and Protection of Indians, April 22, 1850. Passed by the legislature of California, it allowed settlers to continue to the Californio practice of capturing and using Native people as forced workers. It also provided the basis for the enslavement and trafficking in Native American Native labor, particularly that of young women and children, which was carried on as a legal business enterprise. Raids on villages were made to supply the demand, the young women and children were carried off to be sold, the men and remaining people often being killed. This practice did much to destroy Native tribes during the California Gold Rush.
- Gila Expedition April to September 13, 1850. A costly failure by California Militia to punish the Yuma for the Glanton Massacre, that nearly bankrupted the state.
- Yuma War 1850–1853, triggered by the Glanton Gang's abuse of the Yuma on the lower Colorado River. After the failure of California's 1850 Gila Expedition to quell the rising, Major Samuel P. Heintzelman, led Federal troops against the Yuma in the Yuma Expedition, establishing Fort Yuma and making a peace with the Yuma in October 1852.
  - Garra Revolt 1851, by Cahuilla and Cupeño near Warner's Ranch, led by Antonio Garra tried to unite all of the tribes of Southern California to drive out the Americans. It was put down in a campaign by Major Samuel P. Heintzelman, leading a detachment of U. S. Army soldiers and State Militia and by the capture of Garra by the Cahuilla leader Juan Antonio.
- First Pitt River Expedition, April 28, to September 13, 1850. U. S. Army Expedition to establish relations with the Achomawi (Pit River), Atsugewi (Hat Creek) and Modoc.
- Bloody Island Massacre, May 15, 1850, 200 Pomo people killed by a U. S. Army detachment under Nathaniel Lyon, on an island in Clear Lake near Upper Lake, California. This was in retaliation for the killing of two Clear Lake settlers who had been enslaving and murdering the Pomo.
- El Dorado Indian War 1850–1851, California State Militia against the Native Americans in El Dorado County.
- Mariposa War 1850–1851, California State Militia against the Yosemites and Chowchillas.
- Commissioners McKee, Wozencraft, and Barbour negotiated eighteen treaties with California Native peoples at various ranches and army posts, mainly in southern and central California. (March 1851 - January 1852)
- Land Claims Act of 1851
- Bridge Gulch Massacre April 23, 1852, more than 150 Wintu people were killed by about 70 American men led by William H. Dixon, the Trinity County sheriff. The massacre of this band was in response to the killing of Colonel John Anderson by another band of Wintu.
- Indian Appropriation Act of March 3, 1852. The Act authorized five Federal military reservations to be made from up to 25,000 acres of Public Domain lands. Sebastian Indian Reservation was established by the first superintendent Edward F. Beale. Col. Thomas J. Henley, the second superintendent, in 1854, established the Nome Lakee Indian Reservation; Nome Cult Farm; Fresno Indian Farm; and Kings River Indian Farm. In the following years the U.S. military, or California Militia volunteer companies of citizens, began rounding up the Indians, driving them to the reservations and keeping them there by force. A Superintendent of Indian Affairs was appointed for California to oversee them.
- U.S. Senate rejected the 18 treaties negotiated with Native peoples in present day California on July 7, 1852, in a secret vote. For the next 50 years the documents remained classified. Also see California Indian Reservations and Cessions.
- Yontoket Massacre, 1853 massacre of Tolowa people at the village of Yontocket by company of citizens from Crescent City in Klamath County (now Del Norte County, California).
- Achulet Massacre, an 1854 massacre of more than 65 Tolowa people by settlers of Klamath County, California.
- Kaibai Creek Massacre, August 17, 1854. 42 Winnemem Wintu men, women and children are killed by a party of white settlers at a village at Kabyai Creek, on the McCloud River.
- Klamath and Salmon River Indian War, Klamath War or Red Cap War of 1855, against Yuroks and Karuks.
  - Klamath River Massacres (January 22, 1855). Whites in Klamath County, California, commenced a "war of extermination against the Indians", in retaliation for the murder of six settlers and the theft of some cattle.
  - Klamath River Reservation established November 16, 1855, "a strip of territory commencing at the Pacific Ocean and extending one mile in width on each side of the Klamath River, for a distance of 20 miles."
- Mendocino Indian Reservation established in 1856. It was closed in 1866, its inhabitants moved to Round Valley Reservation.
- Tule River War of 1856. State Militia fought against the Yokuts in the southern San Joaquin Valley.
  - Tule River Farm established in 1858.
- Second Pitt River Expedition 1857

=== 1858–1871 ===
- Northeast California Indian Wars (1858–71): Local settler parties or Militia companies fought against the Yana and Achomawi people.
  - Spring, 1859 Local settlers raise an expedition for two months against the Yahi.
  - California's Pitt River Expedition 1859 Yana attacked, rounded up and removed from their homeland by a state militia expedition.
  - August 5, 1861. Skirmish in the Upper Pit River Valley with the Achomawi.
  - August 15–22, 1861. Expedition from Fort Crook to the Pit River
    - August 19. Skirmish near Kellogg's Lake, Cal.
  - 1865 Mill Creek Fight, 40 Yahi killed by settler posse following the Workman Massacre.
  - 1865 Silva Massacre, 30 Yahi killed by settler posse.
  - 1866 Three Knolls Massacre, 40 Yahi killed by settler posse, including Ishi's father
  - 1867 Camp Seco Massacre, 45 Yahi killed by settler posse.
  - 1871 Kingsley Cave Massacre, 30 Yahi killed by settler posse.
- Bald Hills War (1858–1864) Involving first California Militia, then settler Volunteers, then U. S. Army forces, and finally California Volunteers against the Chilula, Lassik, Hupa, Mattole, Nongatl, Sinkyone, Tsnungwe, Wailaki, Whilkut and Wiyot Native American peoples.
  - Wintoon War 1858–1859
  - Federal Peacekeeping fails, State inaction, Settler militia campaigns 1859–1861
    - 1860 Wiyot Massacre
  - 1st California Volunteer Campaign 1862
    - Smith River Reservation (1862–1868), acted as a replacement for the flooded Klamath River Reservation and as a POW camp for the Native people captured in the Bald Hills War.
  - Two Years War 1863–1864
- Mendocino War 1859–1860 against the Yuki.
- Bitter Spring Expedition 1860 Major James Henry Carleton, with reinforced First Regiment of Dragoons, Company K, attacked suspected Paiute raiders along the Los Angeles - Salt Lake Road.
- August 3–12, 1861. Scout from Fort Crook to Round Valley, in Mendocino County
- Owens Valley Indian War (1862–1865) War against the Owens Valley Paiutes or Numa and their allies.
  - Lt. Colonel Evans Campaigns
  - Keyesville Massacre (April 19, 1863)
  - Captain McLaughlin's Campaign (April 24 - July 31, 1863)
  - Owens Lake Massacre (January 6, 1865)
- Mojave Desert Indian Campaign 1866 - 1870 Chemehuevi raids resulting in the killing of some miners and ranchers in the San Bernardino Mountains and Mojave Desert during 1866 provoked retaliation by a San Bernardino County posse.
  - Skirmish of Rabbit Springs 1867 Defeat of Chemehuevi at Rabbit Springs by a county posse.
  - Federal Cavalry patrol Mohave Desert from Camp Cady and other posts along the Mojave Road 1868–1870
- Skirmish at Rainy Springs Canyon March 12, 1867 U.S. Cavalry from Fort Independence pursue and defeat Panamint Shoshone raiders after their raid on the Spanish Mines.

=== 1872–1880 ===
- Modoc War, or Modoc Campaign (1872–1873): 53 Modoc warriors under Captain Jack held off 675 men of the U.S. Army for 13 months. Major General Edward Canby was killed during a peace conference.
- Calloway Affair of 1880 War between the U. S. Army and the Chemehuevi was averted following the murder of Oliver P. Calloway near what is now Blythe, California.

== See also ==
- California Genocide
- American Indian Wars
