= List of California State Militia Units 1850–60 =

The following are California State Militia units that were active in the state of California between 1851 and 1861, prior to the American Civil War.

== Volunteer Companies of the California State Militia 1850-1860 ==
=== Amador County ===
- Amador Rangers, Jackson, 1858 Utah War
- Volcano Guard, Volcano, 1858 Utah War

=== Butte County ===
- Oroville Guard, Oroville, December 22, 1856 - July 5, 1857

=== Calaveras County ===
- First Calaveras Guard, Mokelumne Hill, 1852 - 1853
- Jesus Maria Guard, Jesus Maria, 1854-1857

=== El Dorado County ===
- 1st Company, Mud Springs 1850 El Dorado Expedition
- 2nd Company, Placerville 1850, El Dorado Expedition
- 3rd Company, Placerville 1850 El Dorado Expedition
- Placerville Guard, Placerville, 1855
- Coloma Greys, Coloma, 1857
- Confidence Guard, Placerville, 1860

=== Humboldt County ===
- Union Volunteers, Union, 1855 Klamath War
- Trinity Rangers, Pardee's Ranch, Redwood Creek, 1858 Wintoon War/Bald Hills War
- Humboldt Volunteers, Hydesville, 1860 Bald Hills War

=== Klamath County ===
- Klamath Mounted Rangers, Crescent City, 1854-1856 Klamath War
- Coast Rangers, Crescent City, 1854-1855 Klamath War
- Klamath Rifles, Young's Ferry, 1855 Klamath War
- Mounted Coast Rifles, Crescent City, 1855 Klamath War
- Salmon Guard, Sawyers Bar, 1855-1856 Klamath War
- Citizens of Crescent City, Crescent City, 1856

=== Del Norte County (from 1857) ===
- Crescent Rifles, Crescent City, 1856-1861

=== Los Angeles County ===
- Los Angeles Guard, Los Angeles, 1853 - 1881 Operated against gangs of robbers or raiding bands of Indians.
- Los Angeles Rangers, Los Angeles, 1853 - 1857 Sheriff's auxiliaries vs organized bands of outlaws
- Monte Rangers, Los Angeles, 1854 - 1859 Operated against gangs of robbers or raiding bands of Indians.
- Ringgold Light Artillery, Los Angeles, 1855 - 1857
- City Guard, Los Angeles, 1855 - 1861 "suppressing lawlessness"
- Lanceros de Los Angeles, Los Angeles, 1857 - 1861 "for the preservation of order, the chastisement of criminals and the repression of outrages"
- Union Guard, Los Angeles, 1857 - 1859
- Southern Rifles, Los Angeles, 1857 - 1862

=== Mariposa County ===
- Mariposa Battalion, Agua Fria, 1851 Mariposa War
- California State Rangers, Quartzburg, 1853 Hunt for Joaquin Murrieta
- Mariposa Guard, Mariposa, 1856
- Mariposa Mounted Riflemen, Mariposa, 1858-1861? Utah War

=== Nevada County ===
- Nevada Rifles, Nevada City, 1858-1863 Utah War, Paiute War

=== Placer County ===
- Mountain Blues, Iowa Hill, 1855 - 1856
- Placer Rifles, Auburn, 1856 - 1857

=== Plumas County ===
- Plumas Rangers, Quincy, 1855

=== Sacramento County ===
- Sutter Rifles, Sacramento, 1852
- Sacramento Guard, Sacramento, 1855 - 1856
  - Independent City Guard or City Guard, Sacramento, 1856 - 1880 Paiute War
- Sacramento Cadets, Sacramento, 1856-1857

=== San Bernardino County ===
- San Bernardino Rough and Ready Cavalry, San Bernardino, 1855-1857 Operated against gangs of robbers or raiding bands of Indians.
- First Light Dragoons, San Bernardino, 1856-1857 Operated against gangs of robbers or raiding bands of Indians.
- San Bernardino Rangers, San Bernardino, 1856-1862 Operated against gangs of robbers or raiding bands of Indians.

=== San Diego County ===
- Fitzgerald Volunteers, San Diego, 1851 - 1852 Garra Revolt
- San Diego Guard, San Diego, 1856 - 1863 Operated against gangs of robbers or raiding bands of Indians.

=== San Francisco County ===
- First California Guard, San Francisco, 1849-1879 The first artillery company in the California State Militia. Garra Revolt
- Washington Guard, San Francisco, 1849-1851? Garra Revolt
- Empire Guard, San Francisco, 1849/1850?-1851? Garra Revolt
- Eureka Light Horse Guard, San Francisco, 1852-1854
- First Light Dragoons, San Francisco, 1852-1880
- Marion Rifles, San Francisco, 1852-1861
- National Lancers, San Francisco, 1852-1859
- San Francisco Blues, San Francisco, 1852-1859
- City Guard, San Francisco, 1854-1880
- Templar Guard (Shermans Guard), San Francisco, 1854
- National Guard, San Francisco, 1855
- Sarsfield Guard, San Francisco, 1855
- Wallace Guard, San Francisco, 1855
- Washington Continental Guard, San Francisco, 1855
- Benham Guard, San Francisco, 1856 "State of Insurrection" in San Francisco, 1856.
- Constitution Guard, San Francisco, 1856 "State of Insurrection" in San Francisco, 1856.
- Jackson Guard, San Francisco, 1856 "State of Insurrection" in San Francisco, 1856.
- Jefferson Guard, San Francisco, 1856 "State of Insurrection" in San Francisco, 1856.
- Monroe Guard, San Francisco, 1856 "State of Insurrection" in San Francisco, 1856.
- Union Guard, San Francisco, 1856 "State of Insurrection" in San Francisco, 1856.
- California Fusileers, San Francisco, 1858
- San Francisco Light Guard, San Francisco, 1858
- Black Hussars, San Francisco, 1859-1881
- Carbineers (French Guard), San Francisco, 1859-1862
- Montgomery Guard, San Francisco, 1859-1880
- McMahon Guard, San Francisco, 1859-1881
- California Rifles (French Guard), San Francisco, 1860-1862

=== San Joaquin County ===
- San Joaquin Guard, Stockton, 1851 - 1852
- City Guard, Stockton, 1855
- Stockton Blues, Stockton, 1857 - 1861
- San Joaquin Mounted Rifles, Knights Ferry, 1858 - 1862 Utah War

=== San Luis Obispo County ===
- San Luis Obispo Guard, San Luis Obispo, 1858

=== Santa Barbara County ===
- Santa Barbara Guard, Santa Barbara, 1854
- Santa Barbara Mounted Riflemen, Santa Barbara, 1854 - 1856

=== Santa Clara County ===
- National Guard, San José, 1857-1861

=== Santa Cruz County ===
- Crusade Rangers, Watsonville, 1858 Utah War

=== Sierra County ===
- Sierra Guard, Downieville, 1854-1859
- Goodyear's Rifles, Goodyear's Bar, 1854-1860
- Eureka Blues, Eureka City, 1856
- Forest Rifles, Forest City, 1856-1866
- National Guard, Downieville, 1857-1861
- Gibsonville Blues, Gibsonville, 1858-1861 Utah War
- Mobile Guard, Shady Flat, 1858 Utah War
- Sierra Greys, La Porte, 1858. Utah War
- Sierra Rangers, Allegheny Town, 1858 Utah War

=== Siskiyou County ===
- Siskiyou Guard, Humbug City, 1855-1856
- Scott River Guard, Scott River, 1856-1857 Disbanded when weapons not delivered.

=== Sonoma County ===
- Petaluma Guard, Petaluma, 1856 - 1867
- Sotoyame Guard, Healdsburg, 1858 - 1860
- Washington Horse Guard, Santa Rosa, 1859

=== Stanislaus County ===
- Stanislaus Guard, Knight's Ferry, 1860 - 1862

=== Tehama County ===
- Kibbe Rangers, Red Bluff, 1859-1860 State of California's Pitt River Expedition

=== Tuolumne County ===
- Columbia Fusileers, Columbia, 1853
- Sonora Greys, Sonora, 1854

=== Trinity County ===
- Trinity Guard, Weaverville, 1854-1855 Disbanded after weapons destroyed in a fire.
- Kibbe Guard, Weaverville, 1858 Bald Hills War, Wintoon War

=== Tulare County ===
- Tulare Mounted Riflemen, Visalia 1856 - 1868 Tule River War

=== Yuba County ===
- Independent New York Guard, New York Flat, 1855
  - Mountain Riflemen, New York Flat, 1855 - 1857 Opposed Indian hostilities
- Yuba Guard, Yuba County, 1855-1857 Opposed lawlessness, Indian hostilities
- Marysville Rifles, Marysville, 1859-1866 Opposed Indian hostilities
- Downey Guard, Timbuctoo, 1860-1861 Opposed Indian hostilities

== Sources ==
- The California State Military Museum, California Militia and National Guard Unit Histories, Index to Militia Units of the State of California 1850-1881
- Inventory of the Military Department. Militia Companies Records, 1849-1880
