= Camp at Pardee's Ranch =

Military post in California, US

Coordinates: 40.9012°N 123.8084°W

Camp at Pardee's Ranch was a military post at Pardee's Ranch from 1858 until the end of the Bald Hills War for U.S. Army troops, California State Militia or California State Volunteers.

Pardee's Ranch was a stock raising ranch on Redwood Creek in Humboldt County owned by A. S. Pardee. It was situated where the Trinity Trail crossed Redwood Creek. The Trinity Trail was the major pack mule trail from Eureka supplying the needs of the mining districts of the Trinity River, in what was then Klamath County and Trinity Counties.

Pardee's Ranch became the base for John Bell's 16 man local militia party that pursued the Whilkut following their attack on the pack train of Henry Allen and William E. Ross on June 23, 1858. Following Bell's attack on a rancheria on Grouse Creek on July 15, he was forced to withdraw to Pardee's Ranch pursued by superior numbers of Whilkut warriors. Bell's party remained there until August, being reinforced by some troops from Trinity County. On August 2, 1858, Winslet's party of 16 men from Burnt Ranch were ambushed by the Whilkut in the Bald Hills along a trail to the Hupa villages, killing one man and wounding Winslet. Winslett's party retreated to Pardee's Ranch.

On September 14, 1858, the Whilkut killed settler Paul Boynton about 10 miles from Union. The next morning after Boynton's murder, they attacked Pardee's ranch. One of the partners, Mr. Barney and Mr. Pardee went out and were fired upon, but escaped with their lives and made it back to town. The Indians drove off all their stock and the ranch was destroyed.

The Camp at Pardee's Ranch was ideally located as a base for Captain Edmund Underwood's 36-man U. S. Army detachment to begin providing escorts to pack trains crossing the Bald Hills when hostilities began in October 1858. From early October 14, 1858 it was the place that Captain Isaac Green Messec's Trinity Rangers was mustered and a base for their campaign against the Whilkut, called the Wintoon War.

Afterward, until the end of the Bald Hills War it was at various times a military post for U. S. Army troops and various units of the California State Volunteers operating against the Indians of the Bald Hills.

On March 10, 1860, as part of a letter conveying the depositions of citizens concerning Indian depredations from Humboldt County Sheriff B. VanNest to Governor Downey, A. S. Pardee wrote a deposition in Union, Humboldt County to the effect that Indians had burned his house in 1858 and that he rebuilt on same site. That in 1860, some Indians took shot at him from ambush and he has moved family back into town again. He said he could not afford to keep guards, and that his house will now be destroyed again.
