= Prairie Creek =

Prairie Creek may refer to:

- Prairie Creek, Arkansas
- Prairie Creek, Florida in Alachua County, FL
- Prairie Creek, Indiana
- Prairie Creek Redwoods State Park, in California
- Prairie Creek (California)
- Prairie Creek (Iowa River tributary), a stream in Iowa
- Prairie Creek (Brush Creek tributary), a stream in Missouri
- Prairie Creek (Cowskin Creek tributary), a stream in Missouri
- Prairie Creek (Platte River tributary), a stream in Missouri
- Prairie Creek (Rapid Creek), a stream in South Dakota
- Prairie Creek (Paluxy River tributary), a stream in Texas
- Prairie Creek (Chehalis River tributary), a stream in Washington
- Prairie Creek Township (disambiguation)
