= William Chauncey Kibbe =

American pioneer (c. 1822–1904)

William Chauncey Kibbe (c. 1822–1904) was a California pioneer and the third Adjutant General of California who oversaw the California Militia from its beginnings through most of the American Civil War.

== Early life ==
William C. Kibbe was born in Illinois in about 1822. He moved to New York City as a young man, teaching school in Brooklyn. He rose to become Principal of Public School #19. When news of the California Gold Rush came he went to California to seek his fortune as a miner. With no success in the mines he turned to politics.

== Quartermaster and Adjutant General of California ==
William C. Kibbe was appointed by Governor John McDougal as California's third Quartermaster General in June, 1852, and after William H. Richardson resigned, due to the provisions of the Militia Law of 1852 became the Adjutant General of California in charge of the California Militia also. He was elected to the office of Adjutant General in 1854.

In 1855, Kibbe wrote a drill manual for the California Militia, The volunteer: containing exercises and movements of infantry, light infantry, riflemen and cavalry, as a drill manual for the California Militia.

In 1858, Kibbe was responsible for organizing the Klamath & Humboldt Expedition led by Captain Isaac G. Messec to fight the Wintoon War of 1858-59 against the Whilkut people. In 1859, he oversaw the State of California's Pitt River Expedition against the Achomawi and Atsugewi tribes in the vicinity the Pit River in Northeastern California. He sent Militia units from California to help the settlers in Nevada during the Paiute War.

In May 1861, when the Los Angeles Mounted Rifles absconded with the weapons and equipment of various defunct militia companies in Southern California, blame came to Kibbe. His records under his long tenure of office got into such confusion that the legislature took a hand and tried to unseat him. Governor Leland Stanford kept him in office.

With the advent of mechanized warfare of the shape of the new iron-clads called for new methods of defense. Adjutant General Kibbe in his report of December 3, 1863 to Governor Leland Stanford proposed a novel plan for the protection of San Francisco harbor:

To adequately fortify the harbor it was proposed to construct revolving iron towers at each side of the Golden Gate. These towers to be one hundred feet in diameter and pierced for two tiers of guns with ample space for thirty guns in each tier. Casemated guns were planned for the foundation of the towers. When the towers were completed, massive chains would be laid across the entrance to the harbor. These chains would be drawn up by windlasses operated by steam engines. The chains would be designed to check the speed of any enemy vessel and bring it under fire of the guns in the towers. Kibbe contended that if the towers could be built and other approaches to the city fortified, the navies of the world could be kept out of the harbor.

== Later life ==
Kibbe was replaced by George S. Evans when he was appointed Adjutant General by Governor Frederick Low, May 1, 1864. After the Civil War, Kibbe returned to Brooklyn and held an office in the Hall of records there. He died in January 1904, at his home, 464 Macon Street, in Brooklyn, New York at the age of 82 years.
