= Round Valley, Mendocino County, California =

Historical Landmark in Mendocino County, United States

Round Valley
- Location within California Location within the United States
- 39.729°N 123.251°W
- Location: California State Route 162, Mendocino County, California

History
- Built: Discovered 1854

California Historical Landmark
- Reference no.: 674

Round Valley is California Historical Landmark No. 674, in Mendocino County off California State Route 162. Settlers first discovered Round Valley on May 15, 1854. Frank M. Azbil was traveling from the City of Eden Valley in Placer County when he came across Round Valley. Later in 1854 Charles Kelsey from the City of Clear Lake traveled to Round Valley. George E. White spotted Round Valley while he was at Blue Nose Mountain (7274 ft). A historical marker is at Inspiration Point on California State Route 162, 5 miles south of Covelo, California.

The Historical marker reads:

The first inhabitants of Round Valley were the Yuki who resided here for thousands of years in harmony with their natural surroundings. In 1854, European settlers entered the valley. In 1856, conflicts between settlers and Yuki escalated and to protect local tribes the entire watershed was designated a reservation. Additional tribes were subsequently forced on the property: Monlacki, Wylaki, Lassik, Sinhtone, Pomo (including Cahto, Kabeyo, Shodakai, Yokayo, Shokawa, Shanel, Kashaya, and Habenapo among others), Wappo, Concow Maidu, Colusa, and Achumawi. In 1864, the government reduced the reservation by four-fifths, to its current size.

California Registered Historical Landmark No. 674

Plaque first placed May 30, 1959. This plaque placed by the State Department of Parks and Recreation in cooperation with the people of Mendocino County, March 21, 2002.

== See also ==
- Yuki people
- California Historical Landmarks in Mendocino County
- Round Valley Indian Tribes of the Round Valley Reservation North of Round Valley
- Mendocino Indian Reservation
