= Minor Creek =

Minor Creek may refer to:

- Minor Creek (California)
- Minor Creek (Missouri)
