= Hydesville Volunteer Company =

Hydesville Volunteer Company (formed in 1859) was an American posse or local militia that fought Indian raids against the settlers in the Bald Hills War.

== Background ==
Soon after the 1858–1859 Wintoon War was over, Indians began slaughtering cattle in the Yager Creek region. In May 1859, rancher James C. Ellison was killed while he was pursuing some of the Indians who had taken his cattle. Regular army troops from Fort Humboldt were in the field, but the locals felt they were of no help in defending them.

== History ==
Fed up with the failure of the Army and the State to protect them, the surrounding ranchers and citizens of Hydesville, California organized a volunteer company of 25 men May 28, 1859 to retaliate against the Indians. Bledsoe called it the "Hydesville Volunteer Company", although it had no formal name. This volunteer company was financed by the citizens of Hydesville.

The company elected Abram Lyle, Captain; H. J. Davis, 1st Lieutenant; Eli Davis, 2nd Lieutenant; J. H. Morrison, Commissary & Quartermaster. They separated this command into two divisions, one to patrol the Mad River, the other to patrol North Fork Yager Creek. On June 11, the Weekly Humboldt Times reported the Volunteers had ransacked a number of Indian ranches, killing some of them.

A December 17, 1859 "Letter from Hydesville" in the Weekly Humboldt Times, complained that the writer wants a volunteer company under state authority to “suppress Indians” because citizens of Hydesville have been “taxed” $600–700 so far to support the Volunteer Company. Nevertheless, the volunteer companies continued to operate over the winter, the citizens believing that they would be paid back for their expenses.

In January, the Hydesville Volunteers, unable to continue in the field at their own expense, were disbanded and dispersed to their homes, leaving no check to the advance of the Indians. On North Yager Creek a number of settlers banded together for mutual protection, but were powerless to assist their neighbors.

After the Hydesville volunteers were disbanded the local citizens acted to replace them, formally organizing a state militia company, that would be called the Humboldt Volunteers.
