= Eshpeu, California =

Human settlement in California, US

Coordinates: 41°21′23.93″N 124°4′17.79″W

Eshpeu (Yurok: ʼEspew) is a former Yurok settlement in Humboldt County, California, United States. It was located at Gold Bluff between the mouths of the Klamath River and Redwood Creek. Espa Lagoon is near the site of Eshpeu.
