= Smith River Reservation =

Smith River Reservation was an Indian reservation on the Smith River, set aside April 9, 1862 by the Department of Indian Affairs to replace the Klamath River Reservation that had been destroyed by the Great Flood of 1862 and as a reservation for the Tolowa people.

Camp Lincoln was built nearby to replace Fort Ter-Waw, which also had been severely damaged in the flood. Camp Lincoln was built to protect the American citizens in the vicinity of Crescent City from the native people. However, it was moved on September 11, 1862, by Major James F. Curtis to a location six miles north of the city in a clearing in a forest of redwoods near the reservation. This was done to protect the reservation Indians from the citizens.

In September, 1862, over 800 of the native people captured in the Bald Hills War were sent to the Reservation. The garrison was given the additional task of preventing them from escaping and returning to the Bald Hills and Eel River country. However, they were not very successful in that task; hundreds of these native people escaped that Fall.

The Smith River Reservation was discontinued by act of Congress on July 28, 1868.

== See also ==
- Mendocino Indian Reservation
- Nome Cult Farm
- Sebastian Indian Reservation
- Tule River Farm
