= Jesus Maria Creek =

Stream in Calaveras County, California

- Location of the mouth of Jesus Maria Creek

Location
- Country: United States
- State: California
- Region: Calaveras County

Physical characteristics
- Source
  - location: Just west of Summit Level Ridge
  - coordinates: 38°17′40″N 120°23′6.3″W
  - elevation: 4,140 ft (1,260 m)
- Mouth
  - location: Confluence with North Fork Calaveras River
  - coordinates: 38°17′13.7″N 120°39′38.8″W
  - elevation: 961 ft (293 m)

Basin features
- Tributaries
  - left: Salamander Creek

Jesus Maria Creek is an 18.9 miles (30.4 km) westward-flowing stream originating west of Summit Level Ridge on the western slope of the Sierra Nevada in Calaveras County, California, United States.

== History ==
Gold was discovered along the banks of Jesus Maria Creek in the earliest days of the Gold Rush. The name was derived from a Mexican vegetable peddler named Jesus Maria, who sold to miners in the early 1850s.

== Watershed ==
Jesus Maria Creek originates just west of Summit Level Ridge, a ridge separating it from the Mokelumne River watershed to the north. The creek has several named tributaries, heading downstream first Mexican Gulch on the left, then Salamander Creek, on the left, then Spring Gulch on the right, then Wet Gulch on the right. It then flows through the historic mining town of Jesus Maria, before joining North Fork Calaveras River.

== Ecology ==
Although Jesus Maria Creek flows are seasonal, there are perennial reaches such as where Railroad Flat Road crosses the creek, that could sustain resident rainbow trout (Oncorhyncus mykiss).

== See also ==
- Calaveras River
