= Pitt River Expedition =

Pitt River Expedition of 1859
- Part of the American Indian Wars
Date	1859
Location	California
Result	United States victory

Belligerents
California	Achomawi; Atsugewi

Commanders and leaders
William C. Kibbe; William Byrnes	

Strength
Kibbe Rangers and local posses	

Casualties and losses
	? killed, 500 captured

The Pitt River Expedition is a series of expeditions in the U.S. state of California in the 1850s. The expeditions are named for the Pit River, one of many tributaries of the Sacramento River, and the Pitt River Indians (historical spellings differed). The expeditions were part of the larger American Indian Wars and took place during the California Gold Rush.

== US Military ==
=== First expedition ===
The most usually noted expedition is the Pitt River Expedition, in California, April 28 to September 13, 1850. The Indian Agent, Colonel E. A. Stevenson, led the expedition to the Achomawi (Pit River), Atsugewi (Hat Creek) and Modoc to establish relations with them.

=== Second expedition ===
In 1857, George Crook, later US Civil War Officer and General led the second Pitt River Expedition as a first lieutenant. In one of the several engagements, he was severely wounded by an Indian arrow.

== State of California (1859) ==
The State of California notes expenditures for the California Militia and "Expeditions Against the Indians", 1850–1859; which makes note of a Pitt River Expedition in 1859 . Ongoing conflicts between settlers and the tribes in the northern counties of California provoked appeals by citizens for the removal of the tribes from the region. Federal authorities could not do so due to the shortage of Federal troops available; some were already involved in the early phases of the Bald Hills War. Citizens requested Governor John B. Weller to call out State troops from the northern counties to remove the Indians from the mountains and place them on a reservation.

The Governor sent Adjutant General of California, William C. Kibbe to the northern counties of California to organize volunteer military companies to stop Indian raids, collect them and remove them to the Mendocino Indian Reservation. At Red Bluff, General Kibbe raised a company of 93 California militia, the Kibbe Rangers, under Captain William Byrnes. General Kibbe directed Captain Byrnes to carry out an expedition against the Indians in Tehama, Shasta, Plumas, and Butte counties. In the following three months, Captain Byrnes' rangers had many minor clashes with bands of Indians and captured more than 500. Due to the snow blocking the route over the coastal ranges to the Mendocino Reservation, the captive Indians were taken by steamboat from Red Bluff to the Tejon Reservation.
