= John Calhoun Johnson =

American politician

John Calhoun Johnson (c. 1822 - September 13, 1876) was a native of Deersville, Ohio, who practiced law and operated a ranch in California.

His first employment in the West was carrying the mail on snowshoes from Placerville to Nevada City, during which time he gave the name of Bigler's Lake to the body of water now known as Lake Tahoe.

Johnson practiced law in the days of the vigilantes and also acted as judge among the miners. When California was admitted to the Union, Johnson was one of the first lawyers to be admitted to the bar of this state and engaged in practice in El Dorado, Amador, Nevada, Sacramento and other northern counties in the District and Circuit Courts. He was also a member of one of the first sessions of the California Legislature.

Shortly after arriving the first time, he returned to the Midwest, where he enlightened several friends and counterparts as to the land, beauty, and opportunities awaiting them out west in the new frontier. Johnson had an Indian scout companion by the name of Fallen Leaf (after which he later named Fallen Leaf Lake), and John C. Fremont (the man who is credited with being the first white man to witness Lake Tahoe in 1844) had a scout with the same name. Bearing in mind this could possibly have been the same person; one would have to wonder if Fallen Leaf was companion to Fremont or Johnson first.

== Johnson's Ranch ==
Johnson's Ranch, known as "Six Mile Ranch", was located 1 mile (1.6 km) northwest of Carson Valley Road east of Placerville, the current location of Camino, California. The ranch and surrounding 320-acre (1.3 km^{2}) land-hold steadily became an encampment and safe-haven for immigrants, emigrants, soldiers, and prospectors who came across the passes. Accounts say that as many as 1,000 were camped on the ranch at one time.

Johnson's Ranch served many functions. First and foremost, it was the home to his wife and nine children (seven surviving to adulthood). The ranch also served as a way station for thousands of emigrants crossing the Sierra Nevada via Johnson's Pass nearby Echo Summit; it contained a general store noted as being "as fair as any store in Placerville," and hotel for 14 other non-family permanent residents. The ranch had a timber mill and was littered with gold mines, the most profitable being Mills Mine.

Sometime during the Indian Wars of the 1850s, John Johnson's or "Colonel Johnson's" ranch was the temporary encampment to militiamen entrusted with the job of guarding the foothill communities against Indian invasion.

The militia leader was Uncle Billy Rogers, the first sheriff of El Dorado County. His relationship with Johnson is somewhat unclear; however, "It was most likely Rogers who made the encampment arrangements with Johnson. Rogers came west on the disastrous Pioneer Line of 1849 with other 'gentlemen' that did not want to try their hand at the trip encumbered with a wagon or pack animals." Johnson and Rodgers are also documented together in Diamond Springs, California.

== Work as a lawyer ==
Johnson was among the first practicing lawyers of California. He was the first treasurer of El Dorado County, Secretary of Placerville, and soon became one of eight State Assemblymen representing El Dorado County, 1855-56. "He was civic minded and an active member of the Democratic County Committee for most of his life." Johnson served in the California Militia during the El Dorado Indian Wars of 1850-51, earning his declared title of Colonel. It is believed, however undocumented, he was an active Colonel prior to arriving in California. It is quite possible that Johnson was an appointed lawyer through this friendship and not an institutionary graduated lawyer.

== Johnson's death ==
John Calhoun Johnson's died on September 13, 1876, about 30 miles (48 km) above Tres Alamos Station, Arizona and 70 miles (110 km) southeast of Tucson at the hands of the Apache. The exact location is uncertain. It was around the area of the confluence of the Bairbara Coma Creek (the correct name is "San Ignacio Babacomari River") or (simply Babacomari River or Babacomari Creek.) (this location in way south of Tres Alamos) and the San Pedro River. His purpose for traveling to Arizona was to purchase a large tract of land (this may have been "San Ignacio Del Babacomari Land Grant."), and search for farmable land for friends and relatives. He left his wife, family, and house behind. With him were his oldest son George, his partner Mr. Mowery [Mowry], and a young man by the name of George Woolfalk. One-account states:

"…he failed to file papers to keep his homestead in the Placerville area and he traveled with his son George and two other unknown men to Arizona to establish another ranching enterprise in 1876."

== See also ==
- California Gold Rush
- History of California
- Johnson's Cut-off of the California Trail, laid out by Johnson in 1852

Political offices
Preceded by Eight members	California State Assemblyman, 18th District; 1855-1856 (with seven others)	Succeeded by Eight members
