= Mendocino Indian Reservation =

Indian reservation in California, 1856–1866

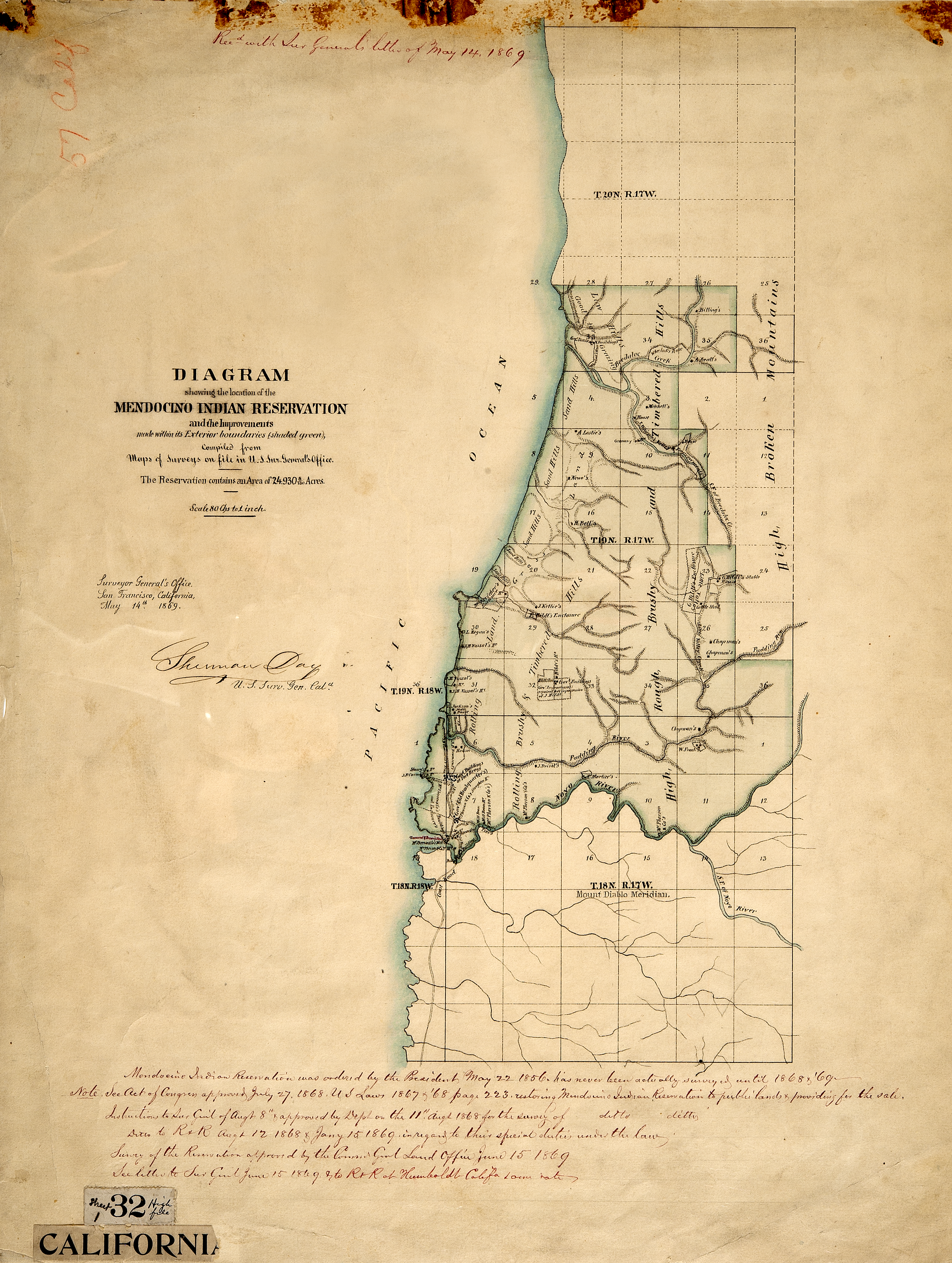
1869 map of the Mendocino Indian Reservation

Mendocino Indian Reservation, a former Indian reservation in Mendocino County, one of the early Indian reservations to be established in California by the federal government for the resettlement of California Indians. It was established in the spring of 1856, in the vicinity of modern Noyo. Its area was 25,000 acres (100 km2) and its boundary extended north from what is now Simpson Lane at 39°24′43″N 123°48′30″W to Abalobadiah Creek and east from the Pacific Ocean to a north–south line passing through the summit of Bald Hill.

== History ==
Mendocino Indian Reservation circa 1856-1866

The area of the reservation was home to Native Americans, most of whom belonged to the Pomo tribe. They were hunter-gatherers who lived along the northern coast of California. In 1855 an exploration party from the Bureau of Indian Affairs visited the area looking for a site on which to establish a reservation and, in the spring of 1856, the Mendocino Indian Reservation was established at Noyo.

Yuki, (Ukiah or Yokiah), Wappo, Pomo, Salan Pomo, Southern Pomo(Kianamaras or Gallinomero), Whilkut (Redwood) and others lived on this reservation.

In the summer of 1857, First Lieutenant Horatio G. Gibson, then serving at the Presidio of San Francisco, was ordered to take Company M, 3rd Regiment of Artillery to establish a military post one and one-half miles north of the Noyo River on the Mendocino Indian Reservation. The official date of the establishment of Fort Bragg was June 11, 1857. Its purpose was to maintain order on the reservation, and subjugate the Indians and reservation lands.

In January 1859 Gibson and Company M, 3rd Regiment of Artillery left Fort Bragg to be replaced by Company D, 6th Infantry Regiment. They stayed for two years and continued to build up the post.

Following the 1858–1859 Wintoon War, the defeated Whilkut people were sent to the Mendocino Indian Reservation. Over the next year they deserted the reservation to return to their homeland in the Bald Hills and the escalating hostilities of the Bald Hills War.

In June 1862, federal troops had been withdrawn to the East to fight in the American Civil War, being replaced by Company D, 2nd California Infantry, that was ordered to garrison the post and remained until 1864. That year, following the end of the Bald Hills War, the Indians who resided on the reservation were moved to the Round Valley Indian Reservation. In October the Fort Bragg garrison was loaded aboard the steamer "Panama" and completed the evacuation and abandonment of Mendocino County's first military post.

The Mendocino Indian Reservation was discontinued in March 1866 and the land opened for settlement three years later.

== See also ==
- Sebastian Indian Reservation
- Nome Cult Farm
- Smith River Reservation
- Tule River Farm
