= Isaac Green Messec =

American ranger & miner (1823–1901)

Isaac Green Messec (1823–1901), sometimes Messic or Messick, was a Texas Ranger, 49er, miner, businessman, California State Militia Captain, county sheriff, sergeant-at-arms of the California State Senate and rancher, a well-known figure in political and mining circles early in the history of the State of California.

== Early life ==
Isaac Green Messec, was born in Macon, Bibb County, Georgia. in 1823. Before 1843, his family migrated to Shelby County in East Texas. Raised in Texas, he became a Texas Ranger. In the Mexican war, he fought in one of the units of Texas Rangers under General Zachary Taylor.

== Gold Rush ==
In 1849, Messec joined in the California Gold Rush, leaving East Texas for California with a party of fifty men, he crossed the entire state of Texas, turned south at El Paso into Chihuahua, Mexico to avoid the Apache, crossed into Sonora by way of the Guadalupe Pass, followed the trail through the future Gadsden Purchase territory to the Gila River, and rode down the Gila to the Colorado River. Fording the Colorado at the future site of Fort Yuma, they crossed the desert to Warner's Ranch and traveled onward to Los Angeles and thence to San Francisco.

Messec then traveled northward to the goldfields of Northern California. Upon his arrival Messec engaged in mining and also owned and developed a large-scale pack train business from the towns on Humboldt Bay into the mining regions of Humboldt, Klamath County and Trinity counties. A success in business, in 1856 he was married to Lucinda Jane Kellogg in Siskiyou County, California.

== Wintoon War Indian Fighter ==
Messec's pack train operations were disrupted by the incidents that triggered the Wintoon War of 1858–59. At the start of the war he was commissioned as Captain of the Trinity Rangers by Governor John B. Weller of California at the request of Adjutant General William C. Kibbe. After leading his unit in fighting between November 1858 and January 1859, severe winter weather brought an end to the fighting. Starving due to the effects of the weather and the warfare taken together the hostile tribes sued for peace. Captain Messec then accomplished the round up and transfer of three hundred Mad River Indians to the Round Valley Reservation. Then his unit was disbanded in March 1859.

Captain Messec, the local hero of the Wintoon War, was elected Sheriff of Trinity County for two terms, 1859–1861.

== Mining and Politics ==
However the decline gold mining in the region and continuing disruption of travel over the pack trails due to the continuing Bald Hills War led Captain Messec to leave for Nevada Territory and engage in mining, on a large scale, at Virginia City, Nevada. Subsequently, he then spent four years in San Francisco, where he figured prominently in local politics and served on a commission that opened new Montgomery Street.

Later in the mines of Panamint Messec, oversaw a force of over 500 men. During 1878 and 1879 he was living at Bodie, California. He also was a Notary Public, and was elected Sergeant-at-Arms in the California State Senate in 1883 and he held the position until 1887.

== Later life ==
Captain Messec owned the Lone Tree Ranch on the San Benito County – Santa Clara County line by the 1890s. He also had a home in Gilroy, California at the time of his death in 1901. He died in Santa Cruz, California, February 9, 1901. He is believed to be buried in the Masonic Cemetery in Gilroy. His widow lived in Gilroy, for many more years.
