= California Historical Landmarks in Mendocino County =

List table of the properties and districts listed as California Historical Landmarks within Mendocino County, California.

- Note: Click the "Map of all coordinates" link to the right to view a Google map of all properties and districts with latitude and longitude coordinates in the table below.

== Listings ==
Image		Landmark name	Location	City or town	Summary
Fort Bragg	615	Fort Bragg	343 N. Main St. 39°26′42″N 123°48′22″W	Fort Bragg	The site of the original U.S. Army fort is the landmark, not the municipality that is currently there by the same name. The plaque identifying the designation is in front of the home of the town's first mayor, one of the few buildings to survive the 1906 earthquake.
Frog Woman Rock	549	Frog Woman Rock	Hwy 101; 38°54′45″N 123°03′22″W	Hopland	
Mendocino Presbyterian Church	714	Mendocino Presbyterian Church	44831 Main St. 39°18′18″N 123°47′48″W	Mendocino	
Point Arena Light	1035	Point Arena Light	Lighthouse Rd. 38°57′17″N 123°44′26″W	Point Arena	
Upload Photo	674	Round Valley	Inspiration Point; 39°43′46″N 123°15′07″W	Covelo	
Sun House	926	Sun House	431 S. Main St. 39°08′51″N 123°12′16″W	Ukiah	
Temple of Kwan Tai	927	Temple of Kwan Tai	45160 Albion St. 39°18′18″N 123°48′11″W	Mendocino	
Upload Photo	980	Ukiah Vichy Springs Resort	2701 Vichy Springs Rd. 39°10′02″N 123°09′32″W	Ukiah	

== See also ==
- List of California Historical Landmarks
- National Register of Historic Places listings in Mendocino County, California
