= Union Volunteers =

Union Volunteers was an American volunteer militia unit organized in Union, California, during the Bald Hills War. They were in existence during 1862.
