= Chilula =

Pacific Coast Athabaskan tribe

The Chilula (Yurok language term: Chueluelaʼ/ Chueluelaaʼ, Tsulu-la, "People of Tsulu, the Bald Hill", locally known as the "Bald Hills Indians") were a Pacific Coast Athabaskan tribe speaking a dialect similar to the Hupa to the east and Whilkut to the south, who inhabited the area on or near Lower Redwood Creek, in Northern California.

Upstream and northwest of the Whilkut along the Lower Redwood Creek lived the Chilula; they established their more than 20 villages only along the eastern shore, because there the mountains were broken by valleys irrigated by small streams, while the western shore was difficult to access.

The Chilula (together with Whilkut) were called by the neighboring Hupa-speaking peoples Xwiy¬qʼit-xwe / Xwe꞉yłqʼit-xwe ("Redwood Ridge / Bald Hills People"), the Karuk also called them Vitkirikʼáraar ("People of Viitkírik/Viitkírak (Bald Hills)"), therefore they were also known as Bald Hills Indians or Lower Redwood Indians. Because of their close Hupa kin they are also called Lower Redwood Creek Hupa or Downstream Redwood Creek Hupa. Sometimes they are also considered another fourth tribelet (subgroup) of the Whilkut and are called the Chilula Whilkut.

Chilula descendants have since been incorporated into the Hupa:

- Hoopa Valley Tribe (Hoopa, Humboldt County, Population 2013: 3.139) (Hupa, Tsnungwe, Chimalakwe, Chilula, Whilkut)

== Culture ==
The Chilula tribe constructed their homes using the same building methods as other large northwest California tribes. They would split planks from trees that had already fallen down. Even though Redwood Creek was just a small stream with not as many fish as the bigger rivers nearby, it was still really important for feeding the Chilula people. They caught salmon by using spears or dip nets. They also made temporary dams out of brush and put them in the creek to trap steelhead, which are a type of trout. To catch lamprey eels, the tribe would sometimes build two small platforms above a barrier that went across the creek. From these platforms, the men would use dip nets to catch the eels. The Bald Hills and the meadows in the redwood forests had lots of deer and elk living there. The deer that the Chilula hunted for food were also the main thing they used to make their clothing.

== Historic villages ==
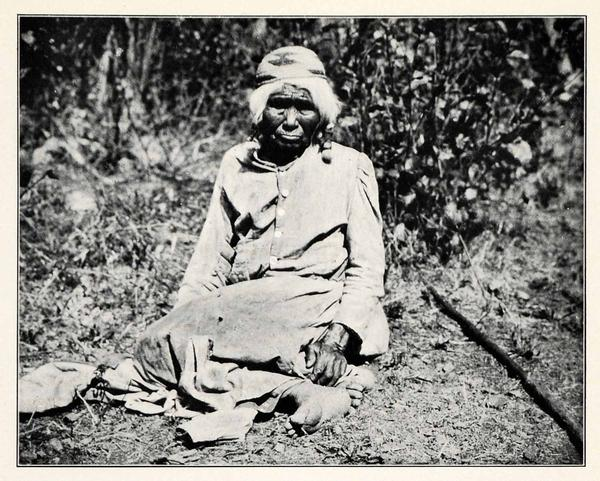
Portrait of a Chilula woman named "Mrs. Molasses," 1912

Groups of Chilula Indians lived in hamlets scattered throughout the area, each containing about thirty people. The Chilula originally had at least 20 villages. Alfred Kroeber identified the locations and names of 18 of these; his spellings are in parentheses.

- kʼinaʼ-xontah-ding (Kinahontahding)
- kinyiqʼi-kyoh-mingwah (Kingyukyomunga)
- łichʼiwh-ʼinahwh-ding (Hlichuhwinauhwding)
- mis-meʼ (Misme)
- noleh-ding (Noleding)
- qʼa꞉ xis-tah-ding (Kahustahding)
- qʼayliwh-tah-ding (Kailuhwtahding)
- qʼungʼ-kyoh-layʼ (Kingkyolai)
- sikinchwin-mitah-ding (Sikinchwungmitahding)
- to꞉nʼ-dinun-ding (Tondinunding)
- tsʼin-sila꞉-ding (Tsinsilading)
- xontehł-meʼ (Hontetlme)
- xowuni-qʼit (Howunakut)
- yinuqi-no꞉mitseʼ-ding (Yinukanomitseding)
- yitseʼni-ningʼay-qʼit (Yisiningʼaikut)
- (Kailuhwchengetlding)
- (Tlochime)
- (Tlocheke)

Most of these settlements were on the east side of Redwood Creek. It was sunnier there and the trees less dense. The Chilulas also had temporary camps on Bald Hills, where they stayed during the summer and fall. They usually chose sites high on a ridge near a cool brook or stream. The Chilula's permanent homes in Redwood Creek basin were square structures made of redwood slabs. Small pieces of leftover wood were used to make drum frames, medicine boxes, and other items. The houses were built over dug-out pits. A notched plank served as a stairway leading down to them. Near the pit's center, a scooped-out area bordered by stones was used for fire.

== Legacy ==
A 205-foot Cherokee-class US Navy oceangoing tugboat was christened the USS Chilula (ATF-153) in 1945, and recommissioned in 1958 as the United States Coast Guard Cutter Chilula (WMEC-153), serving until 1991.

== See also ==
- Population of Native California
- Native Americans in California
