= Prairie Creek (California) =

River in California, United States

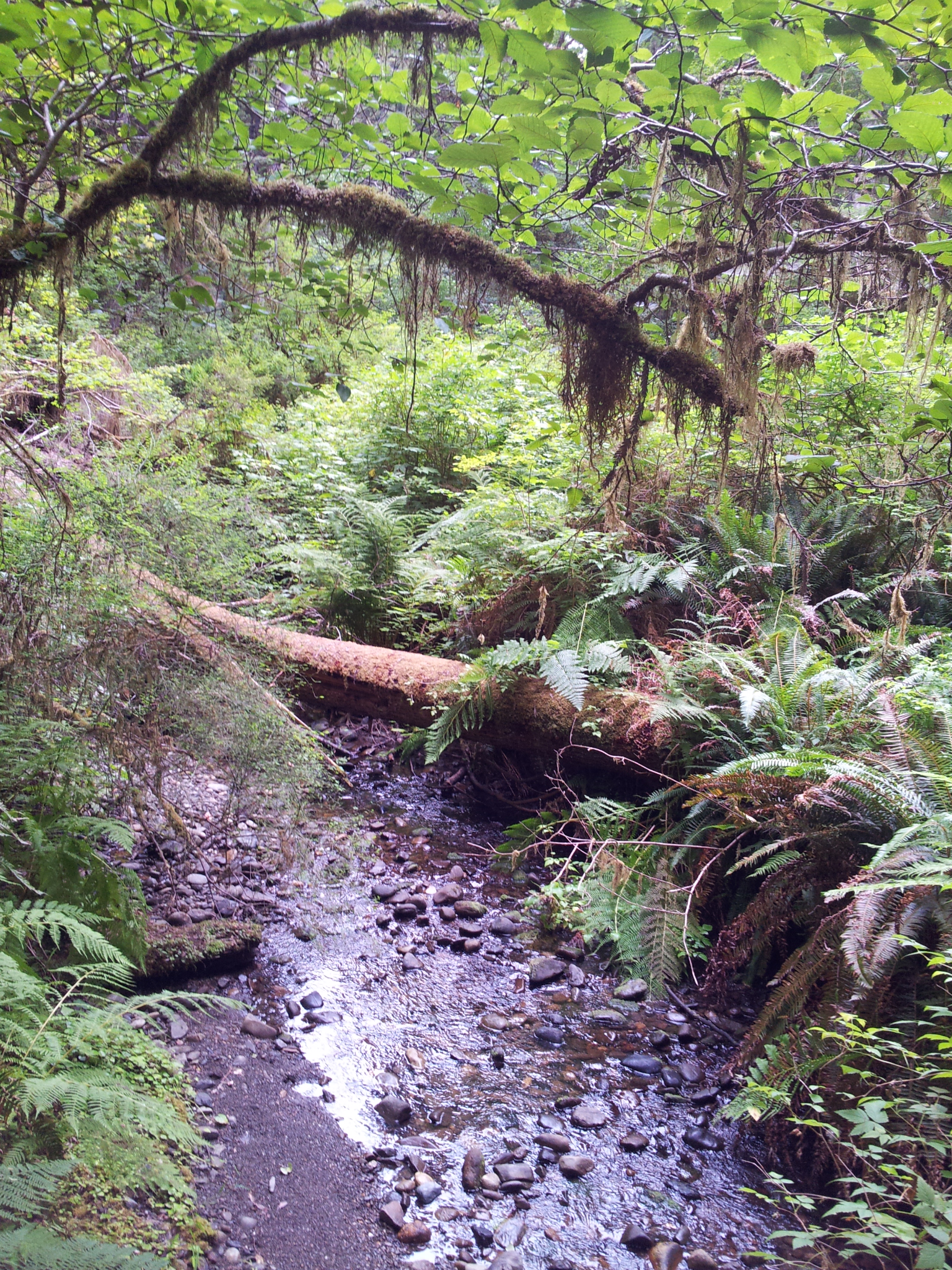
- Prairie Creek within the aboriginal forest of Prairie Creek Redwoods State Park is shaded by an overstory of towering redwoods, an understory of riparian hardwoods, and the ferns and mosses of fallen trees on the forest floor.

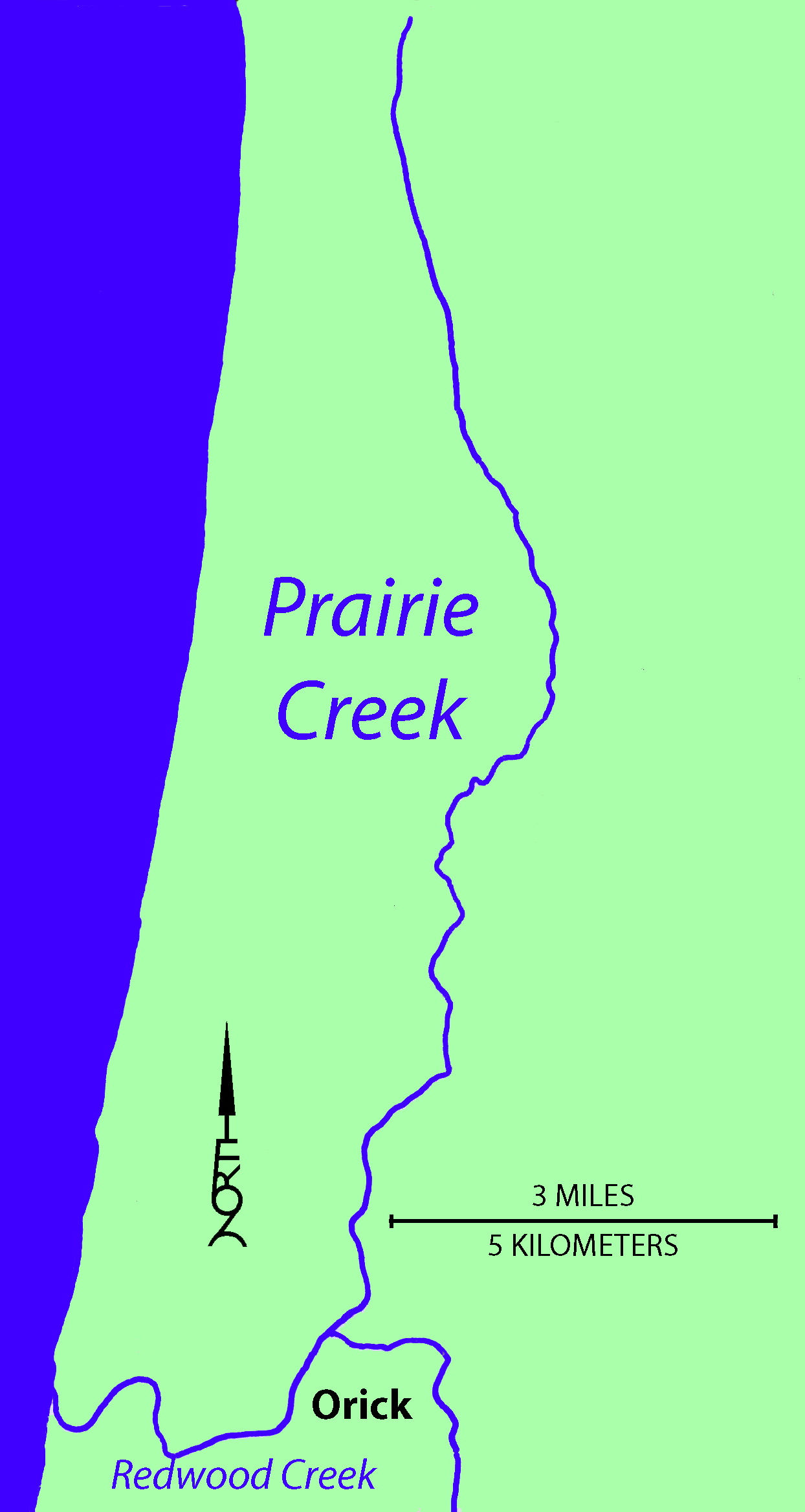

- Location of mouth in CA

Location
- Country: United States
- State: California
- Region: Humboldt County

Physical characteristics
- Source: Springs near Ah-Pah Trailhead
  - location: Murrelet State Wilderness, Klamath Mountains
  - coordinates: 41°26′46″N 124°02′26″W
- Mouth: Redwood Creek
  - coordinates: 41°17′59″N 124°03′02″W
  - elevation: 39 ft (12 m)
- Length: 9 mi (14 km)

Prairie Creek is the Redwood Creek tributary drainage basin including the inland portion of Prairie Creek Redwoods State Park. Prairie Creek drains southerly through a Plio-Pleistocene non-marine sedimentary and metasedimentary formation to a confluence with Redwood Creek approximately one mile upstream of Orick, California. The southern half of the channel exposes the Franciscan Assemblage and the lower reaches flow through Quaternary alluvium of the Redwood Creek estuarine floodplain. Prairie Creek was closely followed by U.S. Route 101 from Orick to the Klamath River drainage divide. The former highway alignment through the park has been designated the Newton B. Drury Scenic Parkway; through traffic now follows a new alignment along the easterly drainage basin headwall.

== See also ==
- List of rivers in California
