= Jesus Maria, California =

Unincorporated community in California, United States

Jesus Maria
- Unincorporated community
- Location in California Jesus Maria (the United States)
- Coordinates: 38°17′08″N 120°38′51″W
- Country: United States
- State: California
- County: Calaveras
- Elevation: 1,043 ft (318 m)

California Historical Landmark
- Reference no.: 284

Jesus Maria (Spanish: Jesús María) is an unincorporated community in Calaveras County, California, United States. It lies at an elevation of 1043 feet (318 m) and is located at 38°17′08″N 120°38′51″W. The community is served by ZIP code 95222 and area code 209. The town lies on Jesus Maria Creek, just before its confluence with the North Fork Calaveras River.

The community, the center of a large placer mining section, was named for a Mexican who raised vegetables and melons for the miners. It was settled in the early 1850s with a large population of Mexicans, French, Chileans, and Italians. Now it is only populated by a few families who live together and work for common goals, including a large community garden, basketball court, jungle gym for children, and a windmill to pump water.

Jesus Maria is registered as California Historical Landmark #284.

== Politics ==
In the state legislature, Jesus Maria is in the 8th senatorial district, represented by Democrat Angelique Ashby, and the 5th Assembly district, represented by Republican Joe Patterson. Federally, Jesus Maria is in California's 4th congressional district, represented by Democrat Mike Thompson.
