= Prairie Creek Redwoods State Park =

State park in Humboldt County, California, United States

- IUCN category II (national park)
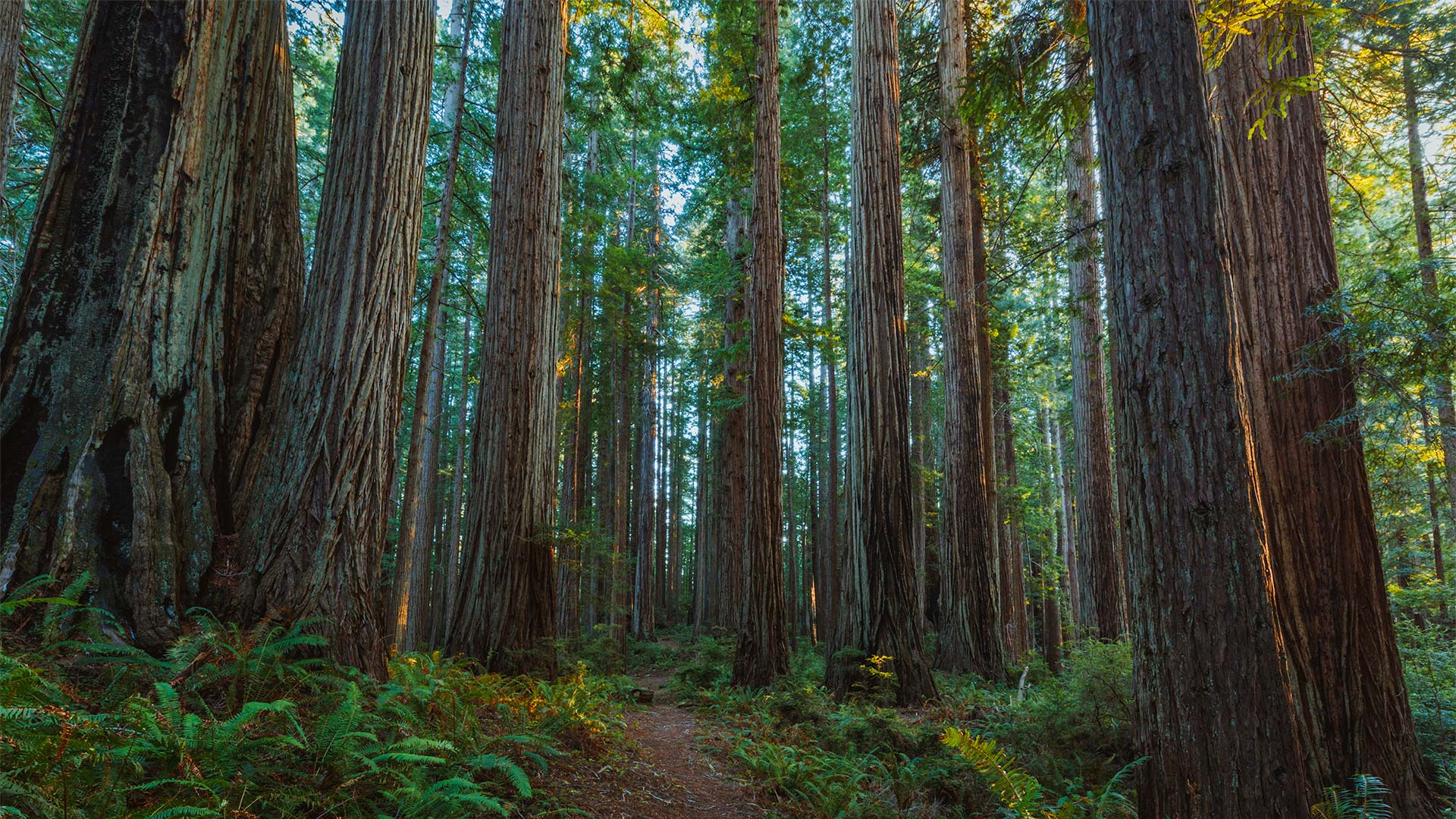

- Location within California Location within the United States
- Location: Humboldt County, California, United States
- Nearest city: Arcata
- Coordinates: 41°24′14″N 124°02′18″W
- Area: 14,000 acres (57 km^{2}; 22 mi^{2})
- Established: 1925
- Governing body: California Department of Parks and Recreation (cooperatively managed within Redwood National and State Parks)

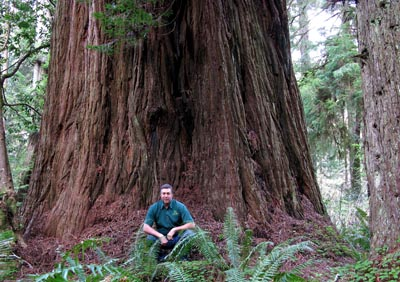
An Arborist in Prairie Creek Redwood State Park, next to a Coast Redwood called Iluvatar, in 2008. This was (2013) the third largest coast redwood known.

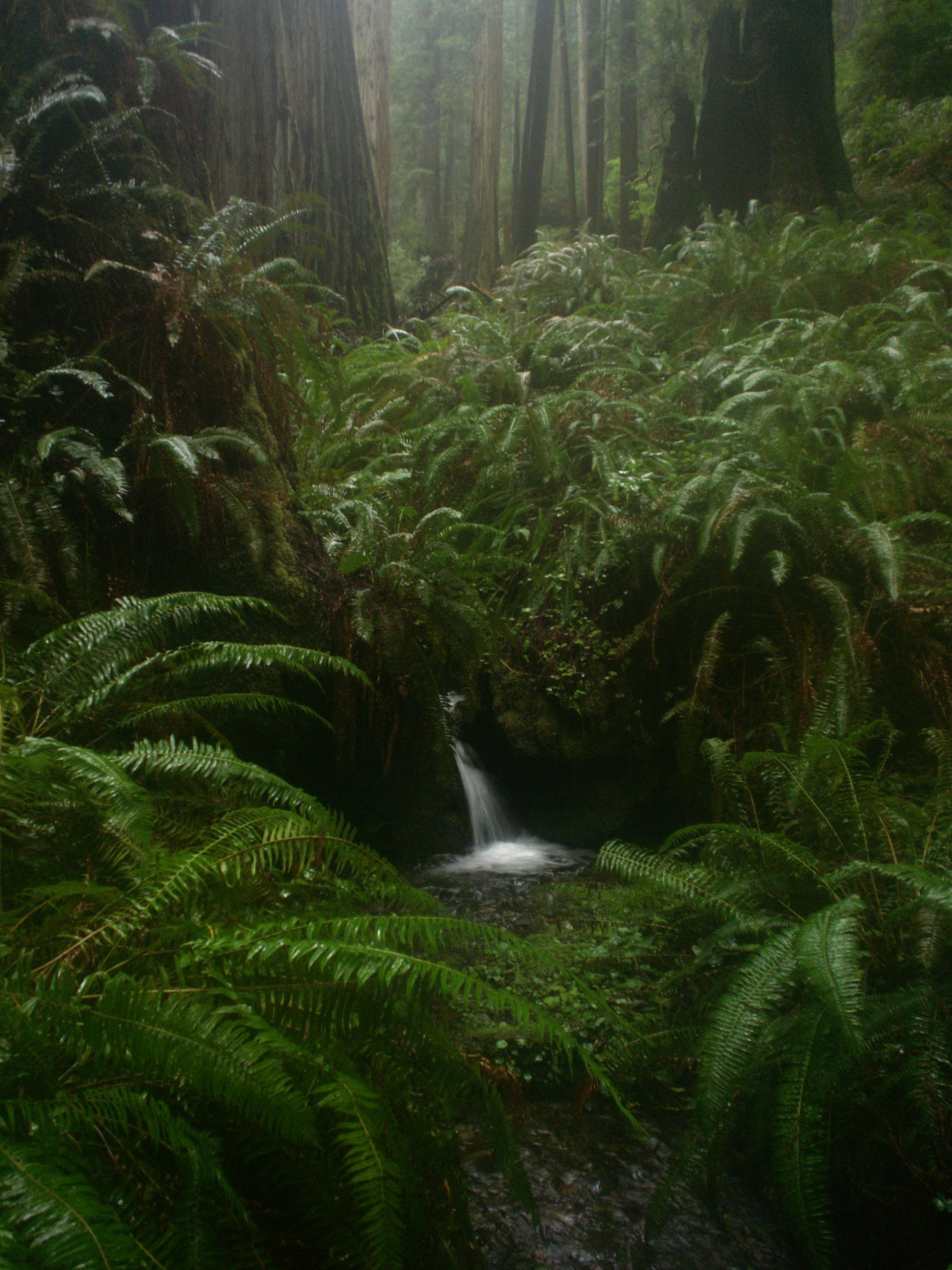
A small waterfall on the side of Rhododendron Trail

Prairie Creek Redwoods State Park is a state park, located in Humboldt County, California, near the town of Orick and 50 miles (80 km) north of Eureka. The 57-square-kilometre (22 sq mi) park is a coastal sanctuary for old-growth Coast Redwood trees.

The park is jointly managed by the California Department of Parks and Recreation and the National Park Service as a part of the Redwood National and State Parks. This group of parks (which includes Del Norte Coast Redwoods State Park, Jedediah Smith Redwoods State Park, and Redwood National Park) has been collectively designated as a World Heritage Site and forms a part of the California Coast Ranges International Biosphere Reserve.

The meadow along the Newton B. Drury Scenic Parkway, with its population of Roosevelt elk, is considered a centerpiece of the park, located near the information center and campground. These open areas of grassland within the redwood forest are locally known as prairies; and the park takes its name from Prairie Creek flowing near the western edge of the meadow and along the west side of the parkway. Other popular sites in the park are Fern Canyon and Gold Bluffs Beach. The park is also home to the tailed frog and several species of salmon.

== History ==
The Yurok, who traditionally lived near the Klamath River and along the coastline of the Pacific Ocean, primarily lived on the lands of what is now known as Prairie Creek Redwoods State Park. Yurok villages, numbering no less than fifty in total, were located from Little River, California, in the south to the Wilson Creek Basin which runs into False Klamath Cove in the north (on the southern edge of Del Norte Coast Redwoods State Park).

Some of the first Euro-Americans to visit the vicinity arrived in 1851 with the discovery of gold in the area that would become known as Gold Bluffs. Gold Bluffs had at one time been a substantial mining camp, although little remains of the camp today.

With the end of the Civil War and a fall in the price of gold, operations at the Gold Bluffs were shut down. In 1872 a Captain Taylor of New York visited the Gold Bluffs to obtain the mine and exploit the rich sands supposedly deposited offshore. In the spring of 1873, over 100 tons of sand were raised from an area from one-half mile to within 40 feet (12 m) of the bluffs, and in depths of from eight to four fathoms of water. However, by the 1880s activities at the Gold Bluffs again began to slump.

One story of the region comes from the area of Gold Bluffs. In a newspaper article from 1984, Thelma Hufford recorded this tale:

At Upper Bluffs, imported miners from Cornwall [England], who were expert tunnel builders and who know how to set up timbers in a tunnel [were employed] ... Arthur Davison said [a tunnel] was opened in 1898. The tunnel was through to the coast. It was 600 feet (180 m) long and 6 square feet (0.56 m^{2}). The tunnel was built to bring water from Prairie Creek to the headwaters of Butler Creek. A reservoir was built on the west side of the creek. It was used for five years. ... The opening, Fay Aldrich said, was on the Prairie Creek side of Joe Stockel's place near the apple tree on Highway 101.

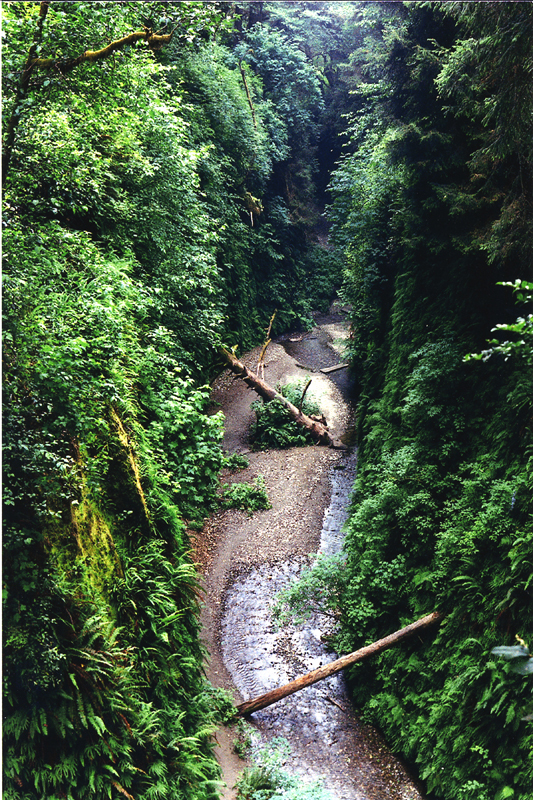
The fern-lined, vertical-walled canyon known as Fern Canyon, is in Prairie Creek State Park, California which is surrounded by Redwood National Park. (Photo from 2012)

By 1920 mining operations at the Gold Bluffs had been closed.

The park was created in 1923 with an initial donation of 160 acres (65 ha) by then owner Zipporah Russ to the Save the Redwoods League. By 1931, the League had acquired an additional 5,000 acres (20 km^{2}) from the Sage Land and Improvement Company, a large timber concern. During the great depression, a Civilian Conservation Corps camp was stationed in the park, clearing out campsites and creating fences on the borders of the prairie.

== Trees ==
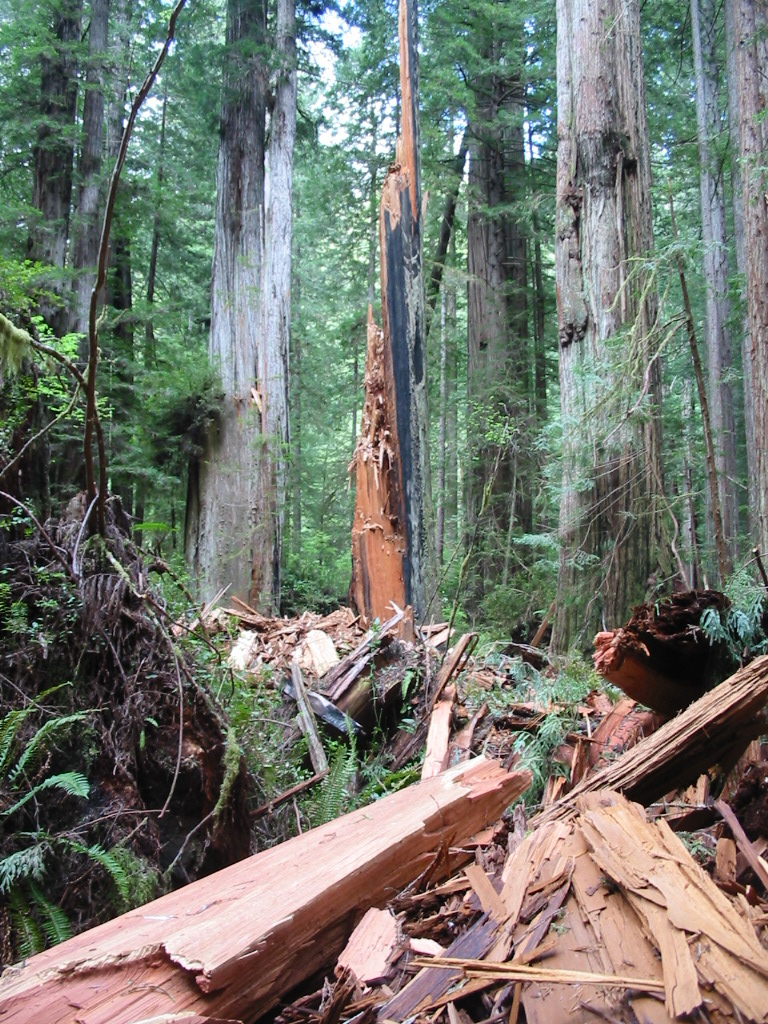
Lightning-shattered redwood, seen along Prairie Creek Trail, north of Tunnel Log

Notable redwoods include Big Tree, Corkscrew Redwood, and the Cathedral Trees. Many redwoods in the park have reached 300 feet (91 m) tall.

Besides Coast redwoods, other tall coniferous tree species in the park's forests include coast Douglas fir, Sitka spruce and western hemlock.

== Trails ==
Trails in the park include:

- Miners Ridge and James Irvine – 11.6 miles (18.7 km)
- Brown Creek Loop – 3.5 miles (5.6 km)
- Big Tree Loop – 3.2 miles (5.1 km)
- Ten Taypo Trail – 3.5 miles (5.6 km)
- Rhododendron and Cal Barrel – 5.1 miles (8.2 km)
- West Ridge and Prairie Creek South – 5.8 miles (9.3 km)
- West Ridge and Rhododendron North – 7.7 miles (12.4 km)
- The Friendship Ridge Trail – 8.0 miles (12.9 km)
- The Ah Pah Trail – 0.6-mile (0.97 km)
- The Nature Trail – 1.0-mile (1.6 km)

Hiker Jim Hamm was attacked by a mountain lion while hiking the Brown Creek Loop in 2007.

== Facilities ==
A visitor center is provided with displays, wall maps and bookstore. It is along the same drive as the campground and some day-use parking is available. There is also parking along parts of the parkway, where elk may be seen; no day-use fee is required to park and leave vehicles in that area during daylight hours.

Restrooms are located near the visitor center and also nearby at the Big Tree parking lot.
