= Prairie Creek (Rapid Creek tributary) =

Stream in South Dakota, U.S.

Coordinates: 44°02′15″N 103°23′23″W

Prairie Creek is a stream in the U.S. state of South Dakota. It is a tributary of Rapid Creek.

Prairie Creek was named for the prairies along its course.

== See also ==
- List of rivers of South Dakota
