= Abalobadiah Creek =

Stream in California, USA

Abelobadiah Creek Tributary to Pacific Ocean
- Location of Abalobadiah Creek mouth Abalobadiah Creek (the United States)

Location
- Country: United States
- State: California
- County: Mendocino

Physical characteristics
- Source: Ventura Gulch divide
  - location: about 4 miles east of Kibesillah, California
  - coordinates: 39°35′21″N 123°44′26″W
  - elevation: 800 ft (240 m)
- Mouth: Pacific Ocean
  - location: about 3 miles southeast of Newport, California
  - coordinates: 39°33′56″N 123°44′26″W
  - elevation: 0 ft (0 m)
- Length: 2.92 mi (4.70 km)
- Basin size: 3.13 square miles (8.1 km^{2})
- Discharge
  - location: Pacific Ocean
  - average: 3.69 cu ft/s (0.104 m^{3}/s) at mouth with Pacific Ocean

Basin features
- Progression: Pacific Ocean
- Tributaries
  - left: unnamed tributaties
  - right: unnamed tributaries
- Bridges: CA 1

Abalobadiah Creek is a stream with its mouth on the coast about a mile above the mouth of Ten Mile River on the Pacific Ocean coast of Mendocino County, California. Its source is at 39°35′21″N 123°44′26″W at an elevation of 800 feet (240 m) in the coastal mountains.

== Variant names ==
According to the Geographic Names Information System, it has also been known historically as:

- Lobadiah Gulch
