= Bald Hills War =

American war against the indigenous peoples of Northern California from 1858 to 1864

- Part of the American Indian Wars
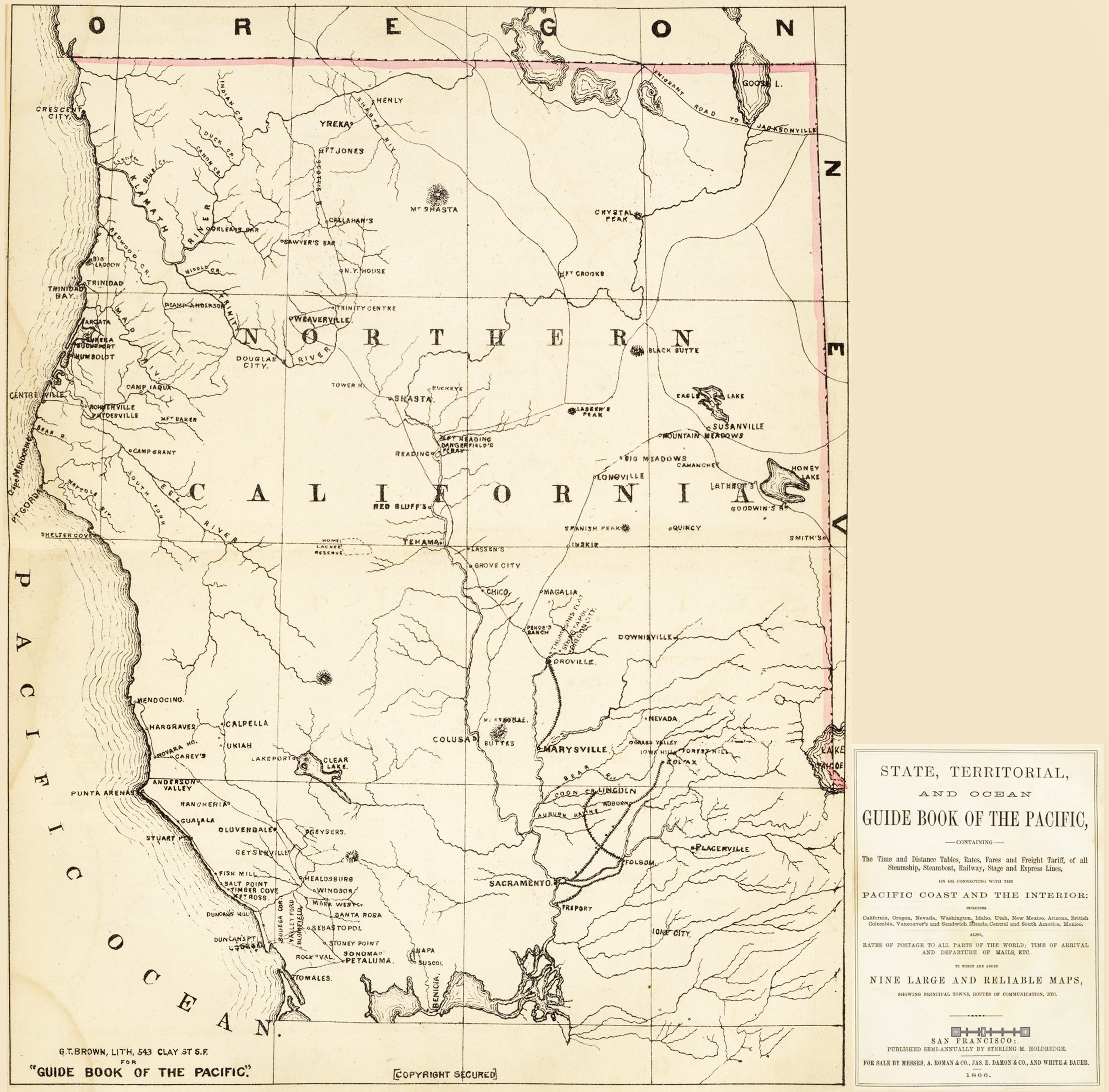
- Map of Northwestern California, ca. 1866, showing the Theatre of the Bald Hills War with a number of forts that figured in the fighting.
Date	1858–1864
Location	California
Result	United States victory

Belligerents
United States: California	Whilkut – "Wintoons"; Chilula – "Redwoods"; Hupa "Mountain tribes" Chimariko; Lassik; Mattole; Nongatl; Sinkyone; Tsnungwe; Wailaki

Commanders and leaders
(United States) Gabriel J. Rains (United States) Henry M. Black (California) William C. Kibbe (California) Isaac G. Messec (California) Francis J. Lippitt (California) Stephen G. Whipple	Lassic-Wailaki + Say-Winne; Claw-Foot; Tsewenaldin John-Hupa; Big Jim-Hupa

Strength
1858–59; Trinity Rangers; 1859–1861 (United States) Company B, U.S. Fourth Infantry Regiment; May 1859 – Jan 1860; Hydesville Volunteer Company; 1860; Humboldt Volunteers; 1861 (United States) Company B, U.S. 6th Infantry Regiment; 1861–1862; Mounted Volunteers; 1862–1865; 2nd Regiment California Infantry; Co. A, 3rd Regiment California Infantry; 1863–65; 1st Btn. California Mountaineers; Co. A, 1st Btn. Native Cavalry; 1864; Co's C, G, E; 6th Regiment California Infantry	Whilkut 250–350 (1858 est.); Hupa 200 (1856 est.)

The Bald Hills War (1858–1864) was a war fought by the forces of the California Militia, California Volunteers and soldiers of the U.S. Army against the Chilula, Lassik, Hupa, Mattole, Nongatl, Sinkyone, Tsnungwe, Wailaki, Whilkut and Wiyot tribes.

The war was fought within the boundaries of the counties of Mendocino, Trinity, Humboldt, Klamath, and Del Norte in Northern California. During the American Civil War, Army reorganization created the Department of the Pacific on 15 January 1861, and on 12 December 1861, the Humboldt Military District, which was formed to organize the effort to unseat the native population. The district was headquartered at Fort Humboldt, which is now a California State Historic Park located within the City of Eureka, California. The District's efforts were directed at waging the ongoing Bald Hills War against the native people in those counties.

== Origins of the conflict ==
There were several causes of the Bald Hills War. The most important was the disruptive effect of commercial hunting and grazing on food plants by the herds of the settlers cattle and pigs. Hundreds of deer and elk were killed by parties of hunters for their hides, used for gloves in the gold mines. Acorns and other plant foods they depended on were eaten or destroyed by pigs or cattle. The hunting and gathering economy of the Bald Hills tribes that had previously satisfied their wants was increasingly disrupted following the Klamath and Salmon River War in 1855. Ever increasing numbers of settlers and others traveling through their territory increased this disruption.

From 1856 onward thousands of acres of native lands were preempted for the growing of wheat, oats, barley and potatoes and for grazing of cattle or pigs. These lands were chiefly in the valleys of Eel River, Mad River and Bear River, and around Humboldt Bay. Ranches and farms appeared in the midst of wilderness where only two or three years before there had been no sign of a white man's presence. Also the lumber industry was operating nine steam saw mills, with a combined capacity of 24,000,000 board feet per annum, by 1856. The farmers and stockmen of Humboldt County found an outlet for their crops and realized a high price for all their produce selling them to the miners in Klamath and Trinity Counties. These goods were packed by mule and the stock driven in herds over the Bald Hills trails to the mines.

For the Whilkut the surge in settlement by cattle and hog raising settlers into their lands in the Bald Hills, and the loss of the game, acorns and other plant foods they depended on, caused a feeling of hatred against them and a desire to drive them from the country. Following the bad winter of 1857, the settlers' interference with the tribes' food supply had become a crisis by 1858. Following a series of small incidents between February and June 1858, hostilities were touched off by the killing of a packer, William E. Ross, June 23, 1858.

== "Wintoon War" and the spread of the conflict ==
The war began with conflicts between Whilkut native people, (known as "Redwoods" or "Wintoons" to the settlers) and local settlers and travelers on the pack mule trails between Humboldt County and Trinity County in Klamath County on upper Redwood Creek and the Bald Hills. On July 1, 1858, three parties of volunteers were organized for a campaign against the Indians on Redwood Creek and Upper Mad River, in the vicinity of Pardee's Ranch. Following the failure of these local militia parties, in late August 1858, citizens of the Bay towns of Union and Eureka agitated for the regular formation of Volunteer Companies, and raising money to defray their expenses. Public meetings of the citizens of Union and Eureka were held for the purpose of considering and adopting some method of protection to life and property during the continuance of the war with the Whilkut.

On September 5, 1858, Governor John B. Weller informed Adjutant-General William C. Kibbe that citizens of Trinity and Humboldt counties had reported to him that a band of Indians of the Redwood Tribe had recently killed several persons, and committed many outrages upon the road from Weaverville to Humboldt Bay. Communication between these places was almost suspended because traveling on that route had become exceedingly dangerous. They were asking the Governor for a military force to open the route, and give protection and security to those who desired to travel over it.

The Governor requested Adjutant General Kibbe to proceed to Weaverville and make a detailed report of conditions in that region, to ascertain the number of Indians in the vicinity, and the character of the outrages that were committed by the hostiles. If hostilities still prevented travel on the road, and Whilkut still maintained a hostile attitude toward the people, the General was to organize a company of volunteer militia to suppress them if such acts were continued, as communication between these important towns must remain open, and protection must be given the citizens at all hazards.

William C. Kibbe, appointed Isaac G. Messec as Captain of the newly organized California Militia company, the Trinity Rangers. Messec led that unit in the Klamath & Humboldt Expedition against the Whilkut people during the fall and winter of 1858–1859. Following indecisive fighting, severe winter weather forced an end to the so-called Wintoon War, and the starving Whilkut were forced to capitulate and were removed to the Mendocino Indian Reservation under the eye of Fort Bragg.

Despite the end of the Wintoon War, the causes of conflict spread the warfare to the Chilula, southward to the Eel River Athapaskan peoples and the Mattole in the Mattole River Valley and Bear River Valley. Additionally the Whilkut gradually returned from the south to their lands. The U. S. Army established Fort Gaston among the Hupa people on the Trinity River and later posts in the Eel River valley to keep the peace in the area. Federal troops were unable to adequately protect the settlers from attacks by native raiders. Settlers dispersed over the countryside were on the losing side of this irregular warfare.

== Local militia actions and the Wiyot Massacre ==
Following the death of a local rancher who was attempting to recover his cattle, the Hydesville Volunteer Company was formed in mid-1859, but it was never given State approval as a state militia unit or any state funding. It disbanded when local funding ran out in January 1860. The localities were financially not up to the task of maintaining the militia, and the State did not support them, seeing it as a Federal responsibility. Trying again, the settlers in the Eel River country formed the Humboldt Volunteers as a state militia unit, in early February 1860. However, on 26 February 1860 some settlers lashed out at the peaceful coastal Wiyot people in a series of killings around Humboldt Bay including the Indian Island Massacre. Some of the members of the Volunteers were implicated in these massacres, and although they were never prosecuted, the unit was disbanded in late 1860. Gradually many settlers in the back country were compelled to abandon their ranches and farms and take shelter at the coastal settlements between 1860 and 1862.

== First campaign of the California Volunteers ==
In late 1861 the Federal troops were recalled to the east to fight in the American Civil War. Elements of California Volunteer Regiments raised to replace Federal troops during the Civil War were sent to the newly formed Humboldt Military District under Col. Francis J. Lippitt. They established a number of posts to protect the settlers, but the troops raised outside the rugged Northwest were at first unsuited to conditions there, and failed to defeat the native peoples. However continued aggressive patrolling finally yielded results. Lassic and his band were driven to surrender on 31 July 1862, at Fort Baker. More of his warriors came in on August 10 and the 212 captured Indians at Fort Baker were sent to join 462 others at Fort Humboldt and held for a time in the makeshift prison created out on the Samoa Peninsula in Humboldt Bay. In September, 834 of these prisoners were then sent on the steamship SS Panama to the Smith River Reservation north of Crescent City with Fort Lincoln established nearby to guard the reservation and keep the natives in it. Seemingly the war was being won.

However, in early October Lassic and three hundred natives, mostly warriors escaped the Smith River Reservation. There followed an exodus of more natives from the Reservation through November. Things were then no better than they were before Lippitt's campaign began.

== Two Years' War ==
During 1863 and 1864, the so-called Two Years' War, the conflict was brought to an end. Col. Lippett was relieved on July 13, 1863, by Lieutenant Colonel Stephen G. Whipple of the 1st Battalion California Volunteer Mountaineers, a former Indian agent, local politician and newspaper editor, who advocated a more active execution of the war with men raised from among the local settlers used to the hardships of war in the redwood forests and the Bald Hills. Under his command of the Humboldt District he began a more active campaign of unrelenting extended patrolling and skirmishing by all the units of California Volunteer soldiers. Henry M. Black filled in while Whipple served in the Assembly for a few months, and maintained the operations that killed or captured many of the native people. Whipple's operations finally compelled most of the tribes to make peace in August, 1864. However, some operations continued into late 1864 before hostilities ceased completely. California Volunteers remained in local garrisons until mustered out following the end of the Civil War in 1865.
