= Round Valley Indian Tribes of the Round Valley Reservation =

Federally recognized Native American tribe in the United States

Coordinates: 39°53′34″N 123°19′44″W

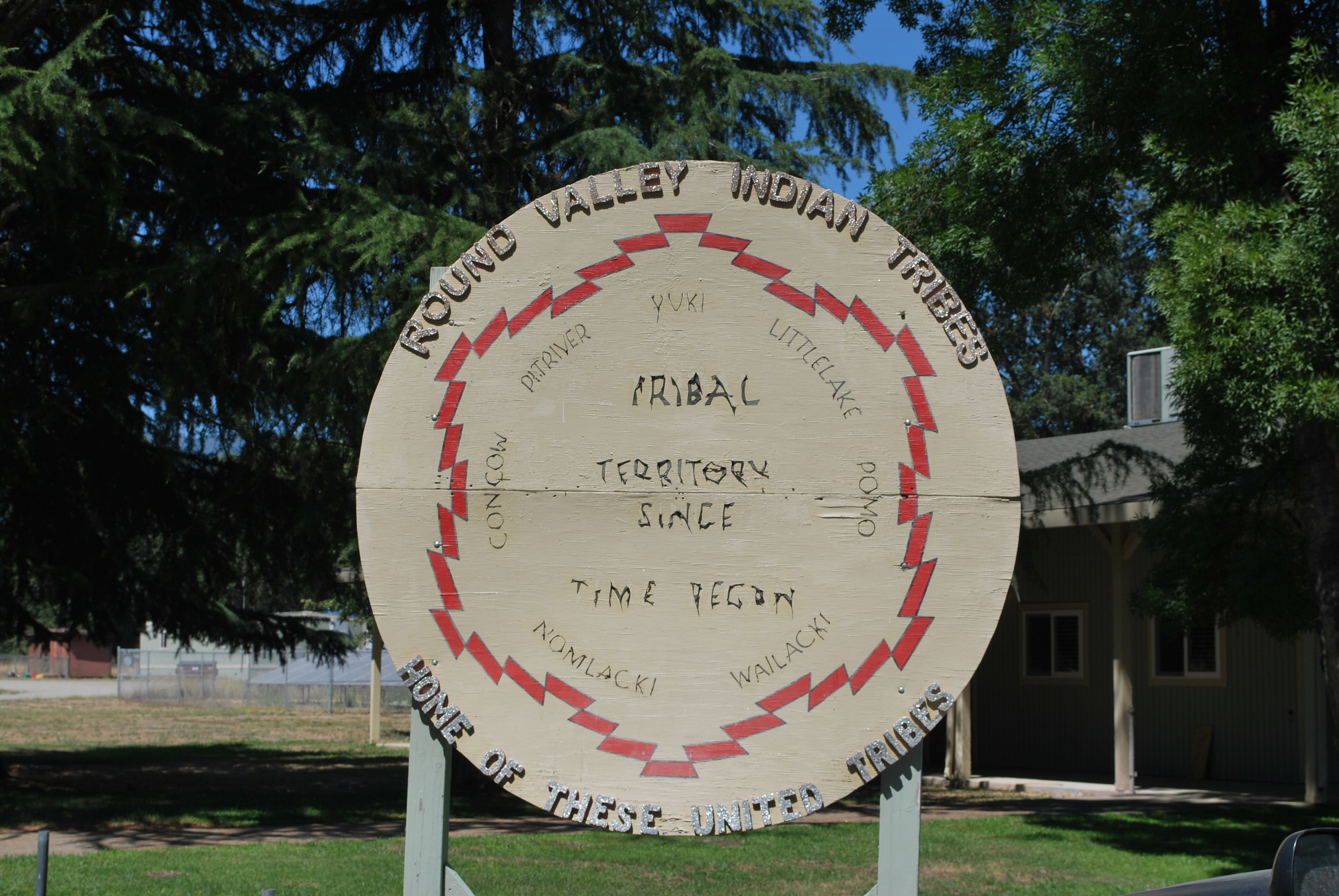
a sign on the Round Valley Indian Reservation

The Round Valley Indian Tribe, originally known as the Covelo Indian Community, is a federally recognized confederation of Native American tribes. These include the Yuki, Wailaki, Konkow, Little Lake and other Pomo, Nomlaki, and Pit River peoples. The coalition was created as federal legislation forcibly removed other Indigenous groups from their ancestral land to land originally occupied by the Yuki people in Round Valley, California. Part of this forced unification was the forced removal of Northern Californian Konkow Maidu people from their land in the Sacramento Valley to the Round Valley Indian Reservation in Mendocino County. The 100 mile march became known as the Concow Trail of Tears or the Nome Cult Trail.

The Round Valley Indian Reservation is a federally recognized Indian reservation lying primarily in northern Mendocino County, California, United States. A small part of it extends northward into southern Trinity County. The total land area, including off-reservation trust land, is 93.94 km^{2} (36.270 sq mi). More than two-thirds of this area is off-reservation trust land, including about 405 acres (1.64 km^{2}) in the community of Covelo. The total resident population as of the 2020 census was 454 persons.

== History of the Round Valley Natives ==
Location of the Round Valley Indian Reservation

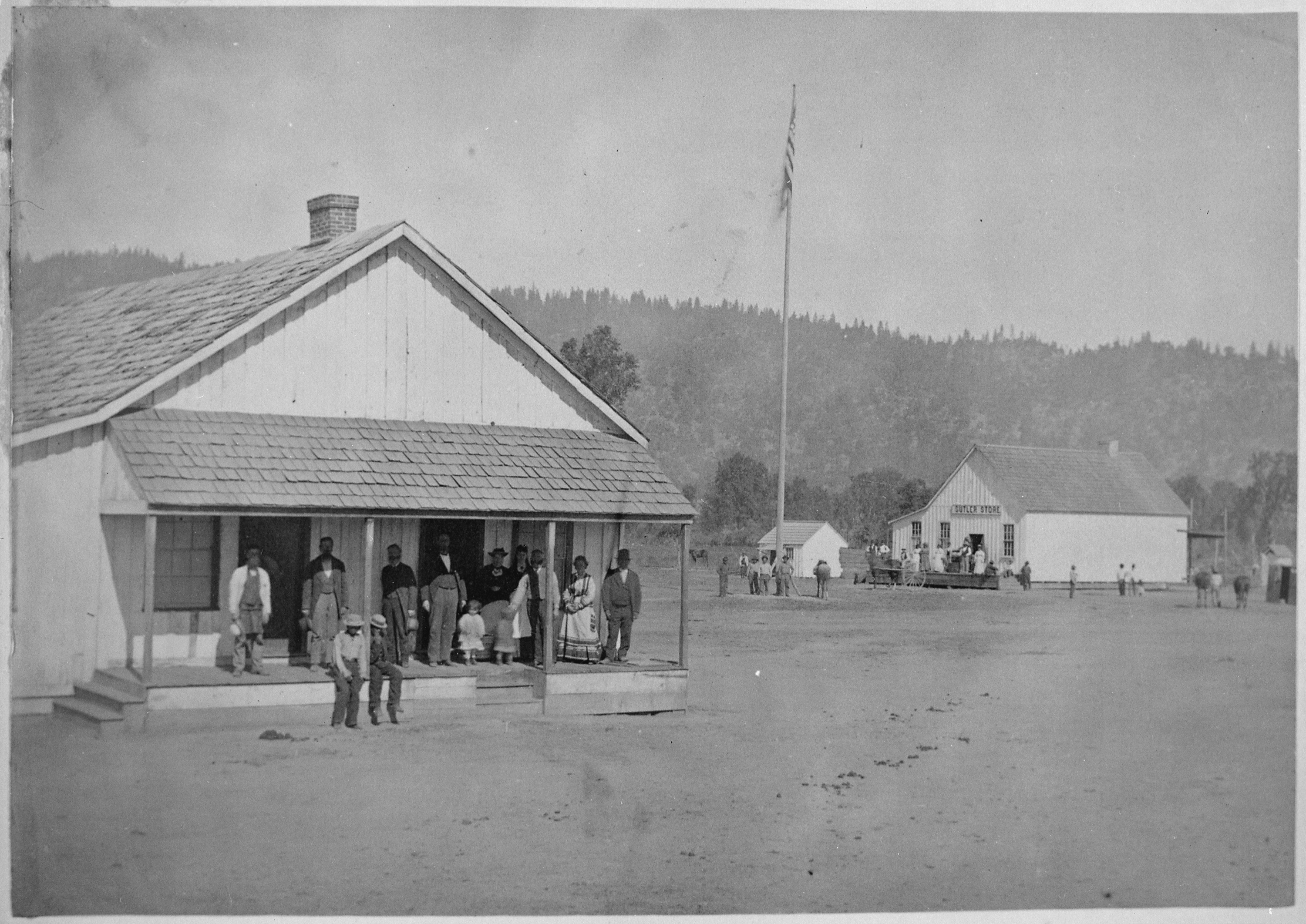
Round Valley Agency sutler and office, 1876

The Round Valley Indian Reservation began in 1856 as the Nome Cult Farm, an administrative extension of the Nomi Lackee Reservation located on the Northwestern edge of the Sacramento Valley, one of the five reservations in California legislated by the United States Government in 1852. The system of Indian reservations freed Indian land for the settlers' use, and cleared Native people from the land by force.

When the reservation was established, the Yuki people (as they came to be called) of Round Valley were forced into a difficult and unusual situation. Their traditional homeland was not completely taken over by settlers as in other parts of California. Instead, a small part of it was reserved especially for their use as well as the use of other Indians, many of whom were enemies of the Yuki. The Yuki had to share their home with strangers who spoke other languages, lived with other beliefs, and who used the land and its products differently.

Indians came to Round Valley as they did to other reservations – by force. The word "drive", widely used at the time, is descriptive of the practice of "rounding up" Indians and "driving" them like cattle to the reservation where they were "corralled" by high picket fences. Such drives took place in all weather and seasons, and the elderly and sick often did not survive.

== Massacres and Fort Wright ==
Between July, 1856, when Superintendent of Indian Affairs, Thomas J. Henley, requested official designation of the valley as Nome Cult farm, and the granting of his request in 1858, Round Valley slowly filled with farms and ranches despite its reservation status.

Relations between the various Indian groups, settlers and white employees of the reservation reached a state of extreme hostility. As part of the California genocide, bloodshed became a frequent occurrence as settlers massacred Native Americans, some at the behest of future first Chief Justice of the California Supreme Court Serranus Clinton Hastings between the years 1850–70. They killed at least 283 men, women and children, the most deadly of 24 known state militia campaigns. The perpetrators of these massacres were paid or reimbursed for expenses by the State of California.

Superintendent Henley requested that the United States Army be sent to the valley to mediate.

Late in 1858, a company of the U. S. Army departed Benicia for Mendocino County. Due to inclement weather, the march was forced to halt at Fort Weller in Redwood Valley, but Lieutenant Edward Dillon was sent ahead with a party of seventeen men to occupy the barracks in Round Valley. Fort Wright was then established in December 1862, on the western edge of the Valley.

Originally the soldiers were to protect the Indians from white attacks but soon, as part of the Bald Hills War, were deployed to capture Indians throughout the area and bring them to confinement on the reservation.

== Federal legislation ==
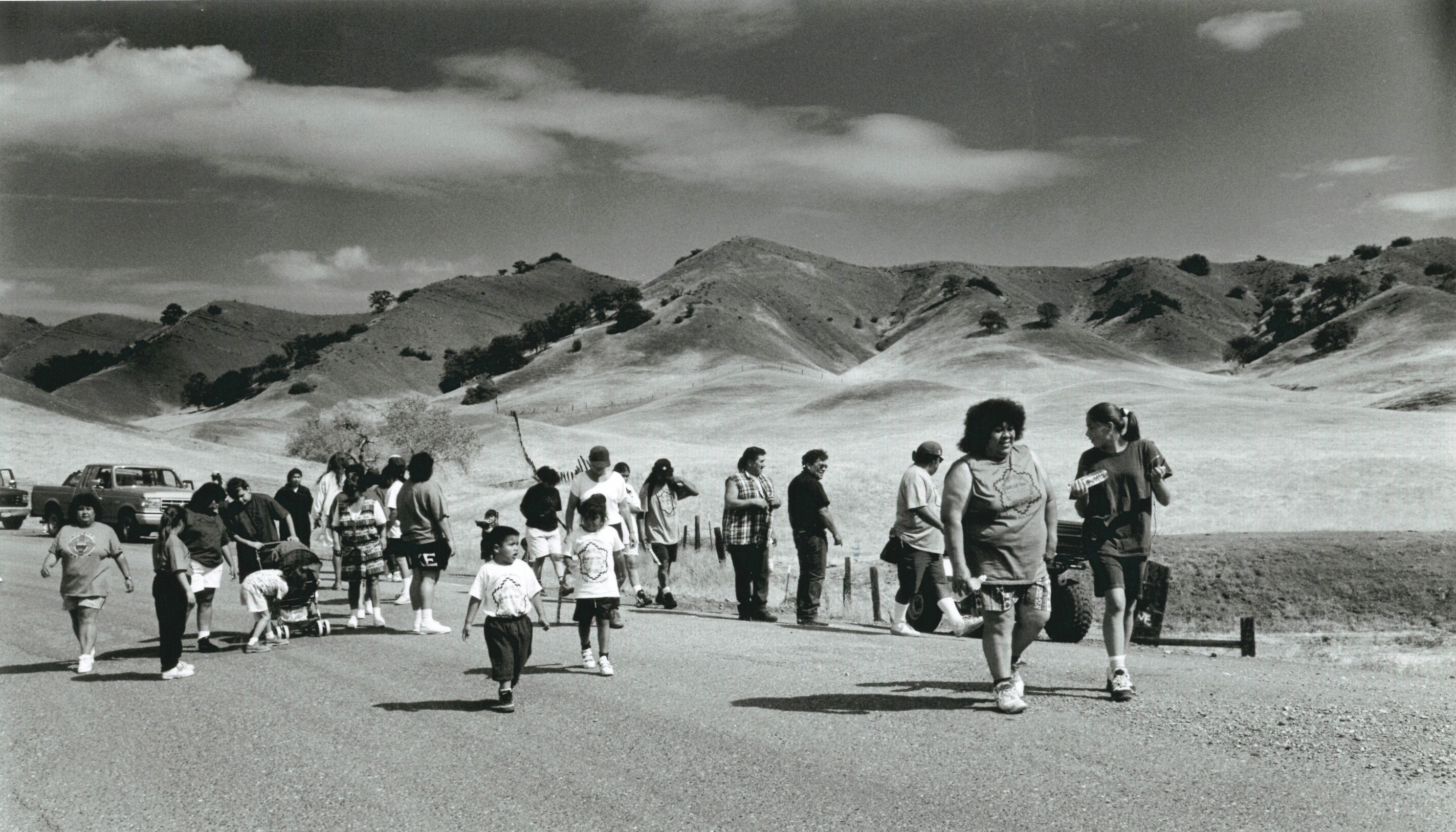
Members of the Round Valley Indian Tribe retrace the 1863 route of the Nome Cult walk, a forced relocation of Indians from Chico to Covelo

President Ulysses S. Grant formally established the Round Valley Indian Reservation by Executive Order on March 30, 1870, pursuant to the Four Reservations Act of 1864. Life on the Round Valley Reservation has since been affected by much government legislation. Two of the most significant impacts were from the Dawes Act of 1887, also known as the Allotment Act, and the Indian Reorganization Act of 1934, known as the IRA.

The Allotment Act caused the Reservation to be subdivided in 1894 into five and 10-acre (40,000 m^{2}) plots which were distributed to families. By assigning specific pieces of land to individuals, the Act opened the door to private land ownership for Indians. Although the land was allotted, it was still held in trust by the government. However, in 1920, allottees were allowed to "fee patent" their land: to receive a deed to it by giving up its trust status and accompanying benefits, such as freedom from taxation. Some Round Valley People lost their land as a result. Either they were unable to pay the new taxes on it or they sold it to whites or other Indians for the cash. Others prospered by establishing farming and stock-raising operations. They leased extra land and raised garden vegetables, hay, hogs, and cattle.

In 1934, the United States Congress passed the Indian Reorganization Act. In the interests of promoting self-government, only those Indian organizations consisting of elected councils, rather than those based on cultural traditions, were recognized as tribes by the Federal Bureau of Indian Affairs. The Indians of Round Valley jointly elected a tribal council and wrote a constitution both of which still function. Along with this alteration in tribal management, a whole range of new regulations intended to halt the loss of land from the Indian Community was also instituted. The IRA repealed the Allotment Act and Indians on the Reservation were deprived of the legal ability to buy and sell land, hold deeds and to take out loans. The land was put back into trust status and trust land could not be used as security.

When first recognized, the tribe and reservation were both known as the Covelo Indian Community.

Other Pomo communities in Mendocino County:

- Coyote Valley Reservation
- Redwood Valley Rancheria

== Ancestral linguistic and cultural backgrounds ==
Before contact, the Native inhabitants of the reservation were Yuki people. The Yuki language (Yuki proper) is one of the Northern Yukian languages, in addition to Huchnom and Coast Yuki. This language family has a distinct local evolution, resulting in a similar structure among the three languages, with distinctions primarily found in phonology and lexicon. The Wappo language is the only clear relative of the Northern Yukian languages under the larger Yukian family, and is distinct from the other Northern Yukian languages in its structure. Surrounding dialects stemmed from significantly different language families, including Athabascan, Penutian, and Hokan. As a result, a challenged posed by the forced acculturation of multiple Indigenous groups was the clustering of peoples from vastly different linguistic backgrounds. The Round Valley Indian Tribe acknowledges the difficulty this advanced for their ancestors, but affirm that cultural unification was reached through collective experience on the Round Valley reservation.

== See also ==
- Mendocino Indian Reservation
- Sebastian Indian Reservation
- Smith River Reservation
- Tule River Farm
- Round Valley, Mendocino County, California
