= El Dorado Indian War =

El Dorado Indian War (1850–1851) was a conflict between Native Americans and miners and California State Militia in what was then the county of El Dorado in California.

Two California State Militia expeditions against the Indians were organized. The First El Dorado Expedition cost the state, $101,861.65, the Second El Dorado Expedition cost the state, $199,784.59.

== Lead-up to the War ==
During the summer of 1850, a group of Indians were murdered by miners and settlers in the neighborhood of Johnson's ranch, an area six miles north of Placerville, California. At the time, it was believed that the Indians had done nothing to provoke the incident. In fact, it was believed that the attack had been done in order to provoke the Indians to commit an act out of retaliation and anger. If the Indians were to retaliate, extreme measures would be taken against them, such as building a permanent military post to monitor and keep them under control. As expected, the Indians retaliated and killed several miners. As a consequence, the miners and settlers complained and wrote a petition to the county and State, pleading for aid against the attacks of the Indians. In response to the complains, three companies of militia were sent out, one from Mud Springs and two from Placerville. The army was placed in command of Sheriff William Rogers and B.F. Ankenny was appointed Quartermaster of the expedition.

== The First War ==
Once all three companies of militia were organized, they started their march to Johnson's ranch. The army set up camp there and they waited for the Indians to show up, but they never did. After approximately four weeks of uneventful camping, the officers in control of the expedition decided to go looking for the Indians. They gave the order to break camp and soon after the whole army was searching for Indians in the direction of a town named Fiddletown. They searched the area extensively, but were unsuccessful in finding any Indians. The unsuccessful search came to an end and the army headed back to Mud Springs, where they were demobilized. This marked the end of the first war of El Dorado county, which was considered a failure. The official report for the war stated that only one Indian had been killed.

== The Second War ==
Although the first war had ended, the Indians continued to act aggressively towards miners and settlers. During the first war, they had traveled high up into the mountains to hide from the army. When the army was disbanded, the Indians came back out of the mountains. They went on a raid through an area called Diamond Springs and killed a miner in his cabin. They would continue to attack more people on this raid, but they would always avoid towns that were highly populated. The raid went until the Indians reached Mud Springs. At this point, they retreated to the mountains and killed two more miners on their way. Once again, many miners complained to the State and urged for protection from the Indians. What they received was another army to fight the Indians. Sheriff William Rogers was put in charge again, with Major A. W. Bee as Quartermaster. The army was filled quickly with many young men and they went hunting for the Indians. The army set up camp at Johnson's ranch and they sent small groups of men to pursue the Indians. According to one report, one of the groups encountered some Indians and killed quite a few of them. However, this report turned out to be a hoax that was intended to stimulate miners and townspeople who loathed the Indians. The campaign was going to be a failure like the first one, so in order to avoid this, Sheriff William Rogers and his staff tried to compromise with the Indians. They created peace with the Indians and ended the second El Dorado Indian War.

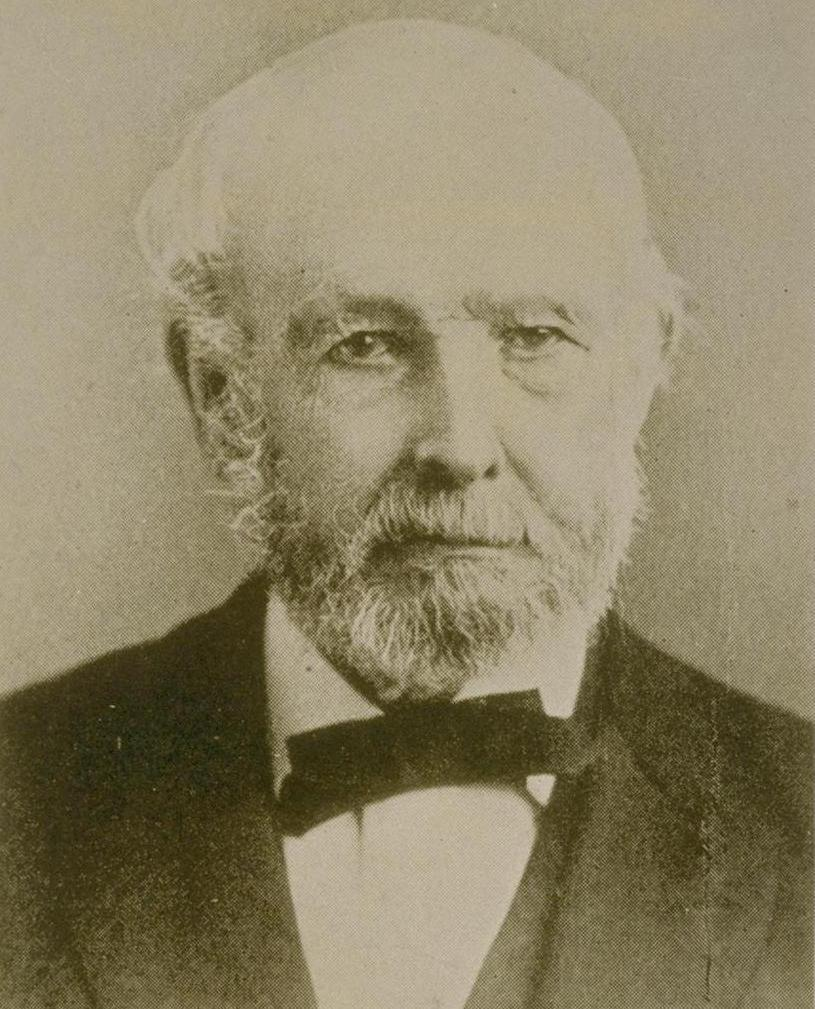
Peter Burnett, the Governor of California during the El Dorado Indian War.

== See also ==
- California Gold Rush
- American Indian Wars
