= Bald Hills (Humboldt County) =

- Location within California

Highest point
- Elevation: 705 m (2,313 ft)

Geography
- Country: United States
- State: California
- District: Humboldt County
- Range coordinates: 41°11′31.449″N 123°56′19.240″W
- Topo map: USGS Bald Hills

The Bald Hills are a range of mountains, in Humboldt County, California. The Bald Hills lie south of the Klamath and Trinity Rivers, between those rivers and Redwood Creek. The valleys at their feet and their lower slopes are covered by redwood forests but their summits are "bald", lacking woodland and are covered by meadows.

These hills gave their name to the Bald Hills War fought between the local Indian tribes among these hills and the forces of local settler militia, California State Militia and California Volunteers and United States Army from 1858 to 1864.

The hills are part of the Yurok Tribal lands. The tribe is working with the local Redwood National and State Parks to restore the California condor to the area.
