= Minor Creek (California) =

Stream in California, U.S.

Coordinates: 40°57′38″N 123°50′13″W

Minor Creek is a stream in the U.S. state of California.

It is named after Isaac Minor.

== See also ==
- List of rivers of California
