= Klamath River Wars =

1855 American Indian War in California

Klamath and Salmon River War, or Klamath War, or Red Cap War, or Klamath River Massacres, was an American Indian War which occurred in Klamath County, California from January to March 1855. The war began from incidents between local settlers and local Indians and a rumor of an Indian uprising against the miners along the Klamath River by the Yurok and Karok Native American tribes. Local miners wanted the Indians armed with guns and ammunition disarmed, anyone trading them to the Indians whipped and expelled from the County and any Indian found with firearms after that time was to be killed. Some of the Indians, mainly a group called the "Red Caps", refused to disarm, and hostilities began between them and the miners. Troops from the California State Militia and U. S. Army eventually stepped in. The conflict resulted in killings on both sides.

The massacres of Native peoples along the Klamath River are considered to be part of the California Genocide. The U.S. government issued an Executive Order creating the Yurok Reservation along the Lower Klamath River, compelling the indigenous population to cease resistance and relocate. This fighting is not to be confused with the Rogue River Wars which occurred in southern Oregon beginning in 1851 with fighting from June 17 to July 3, 1851, then again from August 8, through September 1853, and then again during 1856 from March to June.
