= Humboldt Volunteers =

The Humboldt Volunteers, or Humboldt Dragoons, were a militia company formed by residents of the Eel River Valley, at Hydesville, Humboldt County, California in early February 1860. Seman Wright was elected captain, and E. D. Holland was elected First Lieutenant of this unit. This company had several clashes with bands of Indians in the Eel River Valley during February 1860. They were said to have perpetrated the Indian Island Massacre on the night of February 26, 1860 and others at other sites around the Bay and on the Eel River. News of these massacres brought a storm of criticism that compelled the Humboldt Volunteers to disband in the latter part of 1860.

== See also ==
- List of California State Militia civil war units
