= Whilkut =

Total population
- merged into Hupa people

Languages
- Hupa (Whilkut dialect)

Related ethnic groups
- Hupa people, Chilula

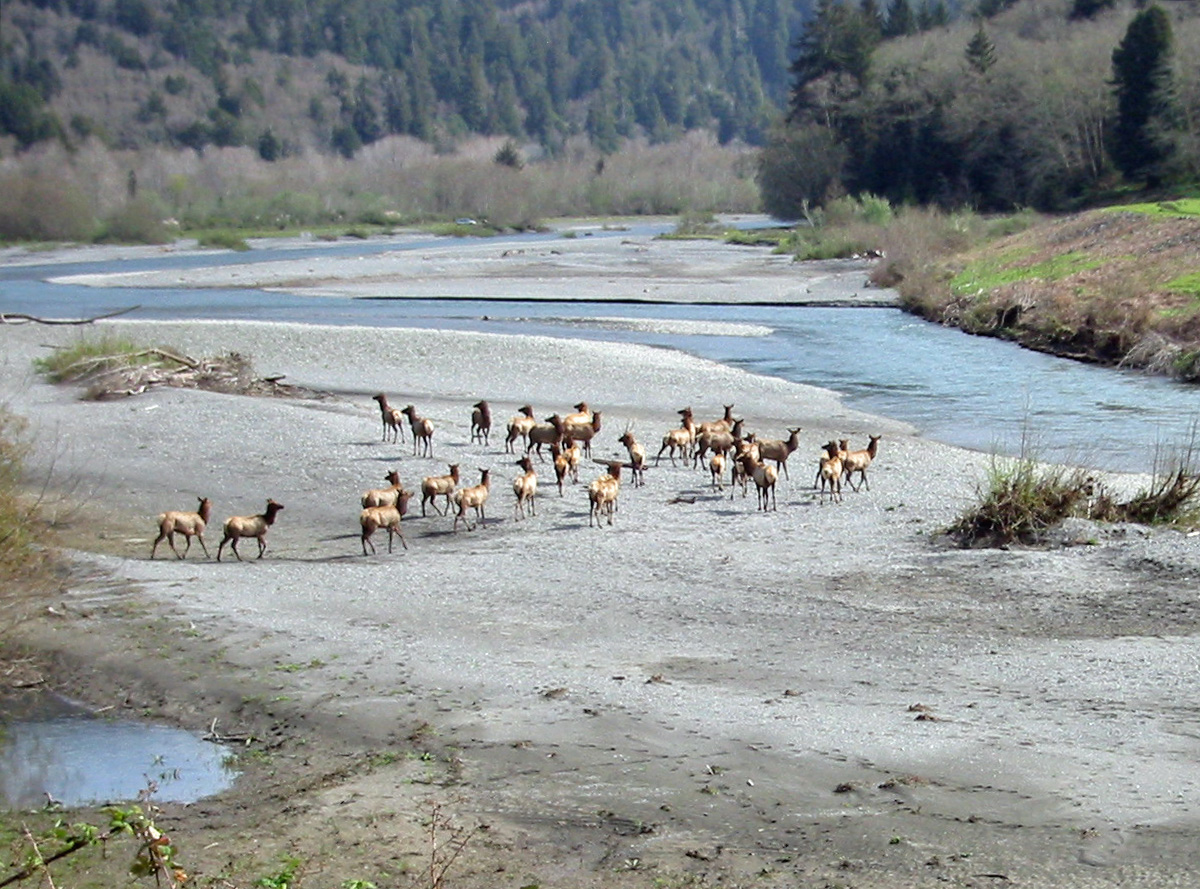
Redwood Creek seen with a herd of Roosevelt Elk on its banks

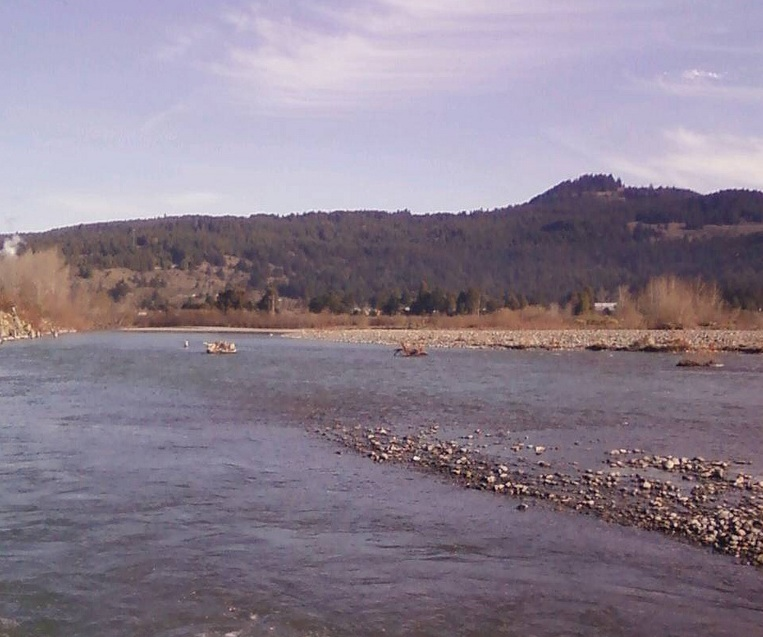
Mad River

The Whilkut (variants: Whiylqit, Hwilʼ-kut, Hoilkut, Hoilkut-hoi) also known as "(Upper) Redwood Creek Indians" or "Mad River Indians" were a Pacific Coast Athabaskan tribe speaking a dialect similar to the Hupa to the northeast and Chilula to the north, who inhabited the area on or near the Upper Redwood Creek and along the Mad River except near its mouth (with the North Fork Mad River), up to Iaqua Butte, and some settlement in Grouse Creek in the Trinity River drainage in Northwestern California, before contact with Europeans.

== Subdivisions ==
The Whilkut may then be divided into four subgroups (tribelets):

- the Chilula Whilkut (Lower Redwood Indians) (by Goddard and Kroeber the ″Chilula Whilkut″ would occupy essentially the territory assigned to the Chilula and are considered a separate tribe called Chilula)
- the Kloki Whilkut / Prairie Whilkut' (Tłʼo꞉qʼ-xwe / Xontehł-xwe - "Prairie People" or Tłʼo꞉qʼ Xwiy¬qʼit - "Prairie Whilkut", also: "(Upper) Redwood Creek Indians"; about 12 villages along Upper Redwood Creek)
- the Mad River Whilkut (Me꞉w-yinaq / Me꞉w-yinuq, Mawenok - "underneath - upstream", also: "Mad River Indians"; about 16 villages along Mad River, Maple Creek and Boulder Creek), and
- the North Fork (Mad River) Whilkut (also: "Blue Lake Whilkut", about six villages along North Fork Mad River and in Blue Lake area (Yitseʼni-xohchʼindił-ding).

Known Whilkut villages: chʼiłqʼun-ding, mił-tehschʼe꞉-meʼ.

The common tribal name as "Whilkut" is an adaption from the Hupa name for the Redwood Creek respectively the Redwood Ridge / Bald Hills as Xwiy¬qʼit / Xwe꞉ył-qʼit / Xoył-qʼit.

The Whilkut (together with Chilula) were called by the neighboring Hupa-speaking peoples Xwiy¬qʼit-xwe / Xwe꞉yłqʼit-xwe ("Redwood Ridge / Bald Hills People"), therefore they were also known as (Upper) Redwood Creek Indians. Because of their close Hupa kin they are also called Upper Redwood Creek Hupa or Upstream Redwood Creek Hupa.

Most authors consider class the Chilula as a separate people, sometimes they are also considered another fourth tribelet (subgroup) of the Whilkut and are called the Chilula Whilkut.

Little is known of the Whilkut culture beyond its similarity to that of the Hupa and criticized by the Hupa and Chilula as guarded, traditional, less settled hill people. Following the gold rush in Northwestern California, routes of pack trains between Humboldt Bay and Weaverville, California, lay through their territory, and their population, never large, was drastically reduced in the 1858-1864 Bald Hills War. Estimated to have 250-350 warriors at the start of the war, the survivors were taken to the Hupa reservation soon after its establishment. After 1870 they drifted back to their traditional homes where they continued to live. Only 50 full-blooded Whilkuts were counted in the 1910 census, in addition to 26 mixed-blood individuals. In 1972 only a remnant was left, perhaps only 20 to 25 individuals.

Whilkut descendants have since been incorporated into the Hupa:

- Hoopa Valley Tribe (Hoopa, Humboldt County, Population 2013: 3.139) (Hupa, Tsnungwe, Chimalakwe, Chilula, Whilkut)
- Blue Lake Rancheria (Blue Lake, Humboldt County, Population 2010: 58) (Wiyot, Yurok, Hupa, Whilkut)

== See also ==
- Population of Native California
- Native Americans in California
