= Redwood Creek (Humboldt County) =

River in California, United States

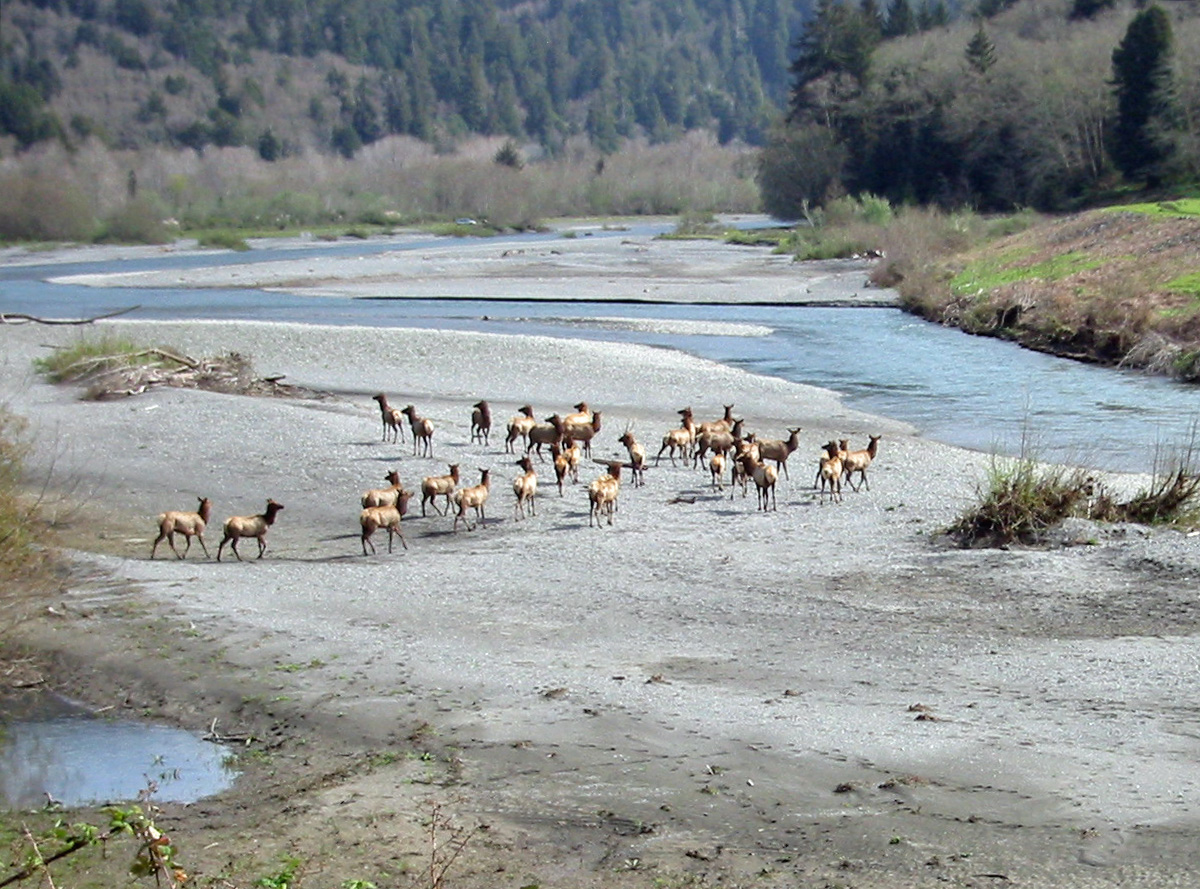
- Redwood Creek seen with a herd of Roosevelt Elk on its banks

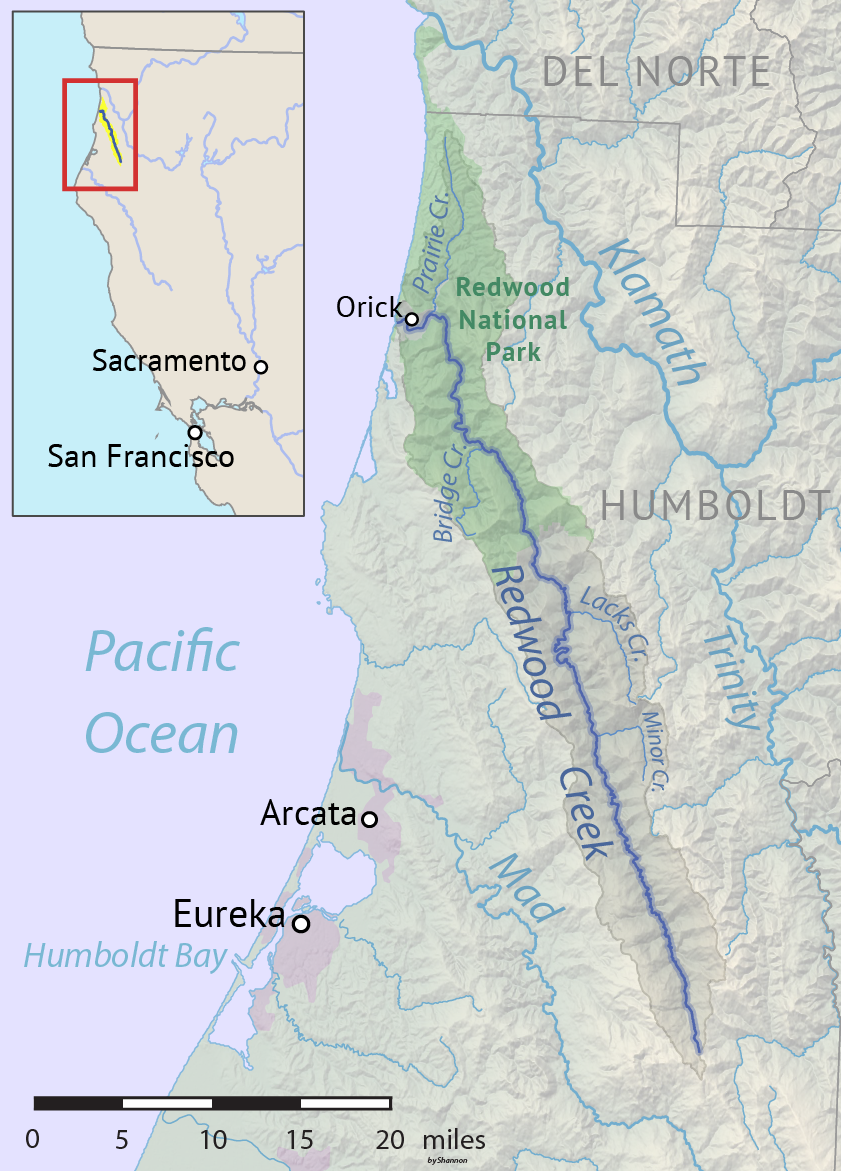
- Map of Redwood Creek basin

Location
- Country: United States
- State: California
- Region: Humboldt County
- City: Orick

Physical characteristics
- Source: Board Camp Mountain
  - location: Redwood National Park
  - coordinates: 40°42′21″N 123°42′14″W
  - elevation: 4,400 ft (1,300 m)
- Mouth: Pacific Ocean
  - location: Orick
  - coordinates: 41°17′32″N 124°05′31″W
  - elevation: 0 ft (0 m)
- Length: 61.8 mi (99.5 km), South-north
- Basin size: 279 sq mi (720 km^{2})
- Discharge
  - location: Orick, CA
  - average: 1,006 cu ft/s (28.5 m^{3}/s)
  - minimum: 2.1 cu ft/s (0.059 m^{3}/s)
  - maximum: 50,500 cu ft/s (1,430 m^{3}/s)

Basin features
- Tributaries
  - left: Noisy Creek (Redwood Creek), Lupton Creek, Devils Creek, Bridge Creek (Redwood Creek)
  - right: Bradford Creek, Minor Creek, Lacks Creek, Prairie Creek (California)

Redwood Creek (Yurok: 'O'rekw 'We-Roy) is a 61.8-mile (99.5 km) river in Humboldt County, California. The river's headwaters are in the Coast Range at about 5,000 feet (1,500 m) and it flows roughly northwest until it empties into the Pacific Ocean near the small town of Orick, the only development in the 280-square-mile (730 km^{2})-watershed.

== Course ==
Redwood Creek begins near Board Camp Mountain in the Coast Ranges near Dinsmores. The stream's headwaters lie at about 4,400 feet (1,300 m) above sea level, in a network of small unnamed streams along the north sides of a ridge abutting the Mad River valley to the south. It flows north through a deep forested valley, receiving many small tributaries including Minor and Lacks creeks from the right. About 15 miles (24 km) downstream of the source, the creek crosses under State Route 299.

Slightly less than 20 miles (32 km) from the mouth, the river passes the southern boundary of Redwood National Park. It then receives Bridge Creek from the left, before winding through several groves of Sequoia sempervirens, more commonly known as redwood trees, from which the stream takes its name. Several of the tallest redwoods in the world are near the creeks banks. Near the small town of Orick it curves west, and receives Prairie Creek, its largest tributary, from the right. It empties into the Pacific Ocean about 30 miles (48 km) north of Eureka and 27 miles (43 km) south of Crescent City.

== Watershed ==
The long, narrow Redwood Creek drainage basin encompasses 280 square miles (730 km^{2}) on the western slopes of the California Coast Ranges, entirely within Humboldt County. It stretches about 56 kilometres (35 mi) from north to south and ranges from 4.5 to 7 miles (7.2 to 11.3 km) wide. Most of the stream flows in a broad, 1,500-foot (460 m)-deep valley sandwiched between the Mad River basin to the west, and the Klamath River drainage to the east. Elevations range from over 5,000 feet (1,500 m) on higher peaks of the mountains near the headwaters to sea level at the creek's mouth at the Pacific. The small town of Orick and the narrow strip of surrounding farmland are the only significant development in the entire basin. The river is free flowing and has no dams, only a few agricultural diversions in the last 3 miles (4.8 km) above the mouth.

=== Land use ===
The river provides recreation, and agricultural and industrial water supply for the community of Orick, California. The lower portion of the creek and part of its estuary are in Redwood National and State Parks, but the upper portion is mostly privately owned. The park makes up 41 percent of the watershed and the Bureau of Land Management and United States Forest Service own 3 percent. Private lands downstream of the parks makes up only 1 percent. Private lands upstream make up 55 percent, 90 percent of which is owned by eight landowners, Green Diamond Company being the largest. Since the 19th Century significant portions of the watershed have been extensively logged, some of which was clear cut as recently as the 1970s when commercial logging and milling operations hurried to cut as much as possible on the eve of expansion of Redwood National Park.

== Ecology ==
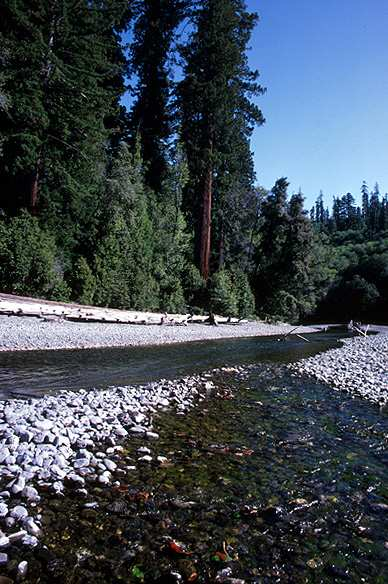
Redwood Creek in Redwood National Park

The river provides wildlife habitat for preservation of rare and endangered species including cold freshwater habitat for fish migration and spawning. The greatest problem for the creek and its tributaries is erosion, which leads to excessive sediment buildup in the streambeds. The increased erosion is caused by extensive logging in the upper watershed, which began in the 1950s and continues today as the primary land use. In the last couple of decades alone, 65% of all land and 75% of the forested land in the basin has been harvested for timber. The building of logging roads has also increased erosion in the watershed. The sediment has filled in the pools and spawning habitat used by steelhead and coho salmon, which has caused a major decline in the fishery.

Habitat in the lower portion of the creek has been degraded due to actions taken after the flooding of 1955 and 1964. The United States Army Corps of Engineers channelized the last 3.4 miles (5.5 km) of the creek through dredging and the building of levees. This has changed the creek's hydrology and sedimentation patterns, resulting in a decrease in flow. In addition, it has destroyed the riparian vegetation, which helps protect against erosion and decreases the water temperature to a level suitable for the creek's coldwater fish.

== See also ==
- Camp at Pardee's Ranch
- List of rivers of California
