= Oketo, California =

Abandoned settlement in Humboldt County, California

Oketo
- ʼO Ketʼoh or ʼO Pyuueweg (Yurok)
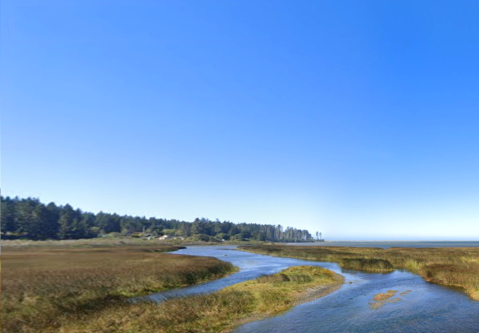
- Opyuweg was on the other side of this tree-covered promontory.
- Interactive map of Oketo
- 41.1648°N 124.1287°W
- Cultures: Yurok Ner-'er-'ner
- Part of: Big Lagoon County Park

History
- Built by: The Ner-'er-'ner people.
- Abandoned: before 1909

Site notes
- Condition: no traces visible
- Management: County of Humboldt
- Public access: yes

Oketo (Yurok: ʼO Ketʼoh or ʼO Pyuueweg) is a former Yurok settlement in Humboldt County, California, United States, but experts differ on what the names were of the settlement itself and of the nearby waterway now called Big Lagoon. Yurok author Chenahwah Weitchahwah (Lucy Thompson) used the name "Ah-ca-tah" when mentioning the location of a religious practice but was unclear whether she was naming the village or lagoon. Peter Palmquist placed the village at the south shore of the lagoon. A. L. Kroeber said the village was called "Opyuweg" (Chwaltaike by the Hupa), mapping it in more detail. T. T. Waterman said the lagoon was named "Oketo" and pinpointed the village most precisely as "Opyuweg", setting it west of a southern promontory of the lagoon and of a settlement called "piNpa" (Yurok: Peenpaa). Coastal Yuroks call themselves Ner'ernerh (Note: also spelled Ner-'er-'ner or Ner-er-ner) and upriver Yuroks call themselves Pueleeklaa. (Note: also spelled Pue-lik-lo' or Polikla) In his notes, C. H. Merriman recorded that "Oketo" was the name the Pueleeklaa used for a Ner'ernerh village at Big Lagoon.

Weitchahwah said a major religious performance called "Wah-neck-wel-ah-gaw" was performed there biannually and, when Europeans first arrived, it was also still held at ʼOʼrekw, Rekʼwoy, and Pekwon, her birthplace. Kroeber says Opyuweg was the largest settlement at Big Lagoon, and among the largest along the Ner'ernerh coast.
