= Khalil Raad =

Lebanese-Palestinian photographer

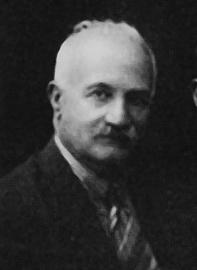
- Khalil Raad
- Born: 1854; Bhamdoun, Ottoman Empire
- Died: 1957 (aged 102–103); Bhamdoun, Lebanon
- Occupation: Photographer

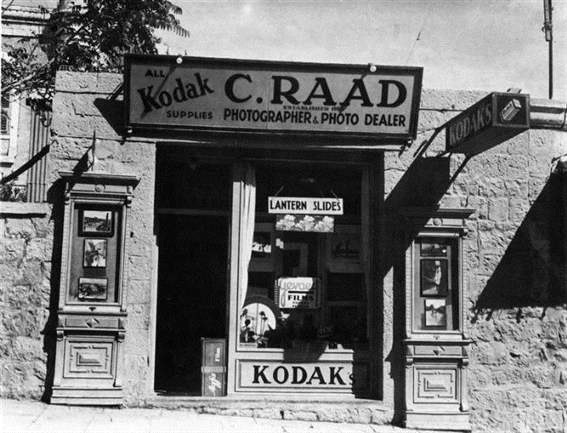
Khalil Raad's store in Jaffa Road, Jerusalem.

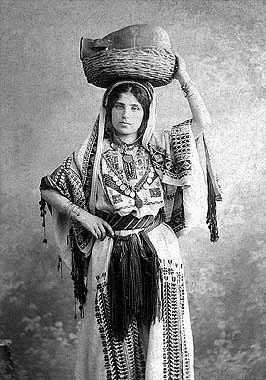
A photograph composed by Raad of a woman wearing the traditional Palestinian costume of Ramallah in 1920

Khalil Raad (Arabic: خليل رعد, 1854–1957) was a Lebanese photographer who was known as "Palestine's first Arab photographer." His works include over 1230 glass plates, tens of postcards, and as yet unpublished films that document political events and daily life in Lebanon, Palestine, and Syria over the course of fifty years.

== Early life ==
Raad was born in 1869 in Bhamdoun, in modern-day Lebanon. His father, Anis, had fled from the family's village of Sibnay after converting to Protestantism from the Maronite faith. During the 1860 sectarian strife afflicting the mountain regions, Raad's father was killed. Following his death, Raad's mother took him and his sister, Sarah, to Jerusalem where they resided with relatives.

== Photography and personal life ==
Raad first studied photography under Garabed Krikorian, an Armenian-Palestinian graduate of a photography workshop established by Issay Garabedian, the Armenian Patriarch of Jerusalem. Raad opened his own studio on Jaffa Road across the street from that of his former teacher in Jerusalem in 1890, engaging in direct competition with him. After Garabed's son John assumed control of his father's studio in 1913 and married Raad's niece, Najla, known as the "peace bride," the two studios worked in partnership.

Raad married Annie Muller in 1919, a Swiss national who served as an assistant to Keller, a photographer who Raad studied with in Switzerland on the eve of World War I. He returned to Palestine with Muller to live in Talibiyya, then a village near Jerusalem in which Raad ran for mayorship and was elected.

Raad continued his photography work, the subject matter of which included political events, daily life, and major archaeological excavations conducted in Palestine. He became "the leading professional Palestinian photographer of his time."

His photography studio was destroyed during Zionist attacks on the city in 1948, and the family was forced to move, going first to Hebron for a few months and then to Raad's village of birth, Bhamdoun. Subsequently, invited to live within the Greek Orthodox Patriarchate by Bishop Ilya Karam, Raad resided there from the end of 1948 until his death in 1957.

== Photographic works ==
Raad's photography documented political events and daily life in Lebanon, Palestine, and Syria over the course of fifty years. He produced over 1230 glass plates which were rescued from his studio during the 1948 Arab–Israeli War by a young Italian friend who crossed no-man's land several times at night. Also in his studio archive were a number of negatives, some of which have yet to be printed. The entire archive was donated to the Institute of Palestine Studies and many of the photographs were published in the work, Before their Diaspora by the Journal of Palestine Studies. Raad's archival materials were described as among "the most precious collections in the IPS archives" alongside those of Wasif Jawhariyyah.

A collection of postcards that bear Raad's signature are held by the Middle East Centre of Oxford University together with 40 prints of Ottoman soldiers in Palestine from World War I. Captioned in English, these photographs "had clearly been intended for use as propaganda by the Ottoman forces," according to Badr al-Hajj. Ruth Raad, Khalil's daughter, said that her father was a friend of the military governor of Syria under Ottoman rule, Jamal Pasha, who facilitated Raad's access to the Egyptian-Palestinian front.

== Criticism ==
Raad also produced postcards for tourists. Modern scholars, such as Annelies Moors, have critiqued his presentation of Palestinian Arabs in this body of work, noting that he "often used biblical connotations that conscribed their lives as static," thus conforming to the Orientalism characterizing Western postcard portrayals of the Other.

Academics who supported the Palestinian's national struggle, such as Bader Al Haj, Walid Khalidi and Elias Sanbar saw the photographs that Khalil Raad took showing the life in the country, criticized him saying he was helping the "Zionist" propaganda. Anneliese Moors, a Dutch researcher, said in response to the academics who supported Palestinian's national struggle believes that some of the photographs of Raad had connotations from the Bible or the New Testament which gave it legitimacy to the photographic characters and their lives. But, both her and Rona Sela an Israeli curator, emphasize that Raad first photographed for commercial and tourist purposes. To explain her opinion, Rona Sela says that Raad "lacked political awareness" and adapted to the patterns that appeared as stereotypical "colonial", which came as a direct effect from the scriptures of the Christians and Jews. Apart from a few political rallies, the photographer did not specify the conflict between Arabs and Jews in his work which occurred during his years that he was an active photographer.

== See also ==
- Karimeh Abbud (1893-1940), Palestinian Arab photographer and artist
- Armenians in Israel: Photographers

== Bibliography ==
- Badr al-Hajj (Winter 2001). "Khalil Raad - Jerusalem Photographer". Jerusalem Quarterly. 11–12. Institute of Jerusalem Studies: 34–39. doi:10.70190/jq.I12.p34.
- Palmquist, Peter E.; Rudisill, Richard; Haynes, David; Sandweiss, Martha A. (2001). Photographers: A Sourcebook for Historical Research (2nd, revised ed.). Carl Mautz Publishing. ISBN 9781887694186.
- Semmerling, Tim Jon (2004). Israeli and Palestinian Postcards: Presentations of National Self. University of Texas Press. ISBN 9780292702158.
- Hey, there were people here! Museum presents a candid view of early Palestine. By BRETT KLINE Jerusalem Post Magazine, July 9, 2010
- Perspective is everything, Haaretz Supplement, September 9, 2010
- Chalil Raad, Photographs 1891-1948, Gutman Art Museum, 2010 (curator, book)
- Photography, History, Identity Archived 2011-07-28 at the Wayback Machine By Guy Raz
- This week in Palestine, Khalil Raad
- Rona Sela, Chalil Raad
- Tamari, Salim (2013). "The War Photography of Khalil Raad: Ottoman Modernity and the Biblical Gaze". Jerusalem Quarterly (52). Institute for Palestine Studies. doi:10.70190/jq.I52.p25.
- Chalil Raad images at Getty
