= Armenians in Israel and Palestine =

Ethnic group in Israel and Palestine

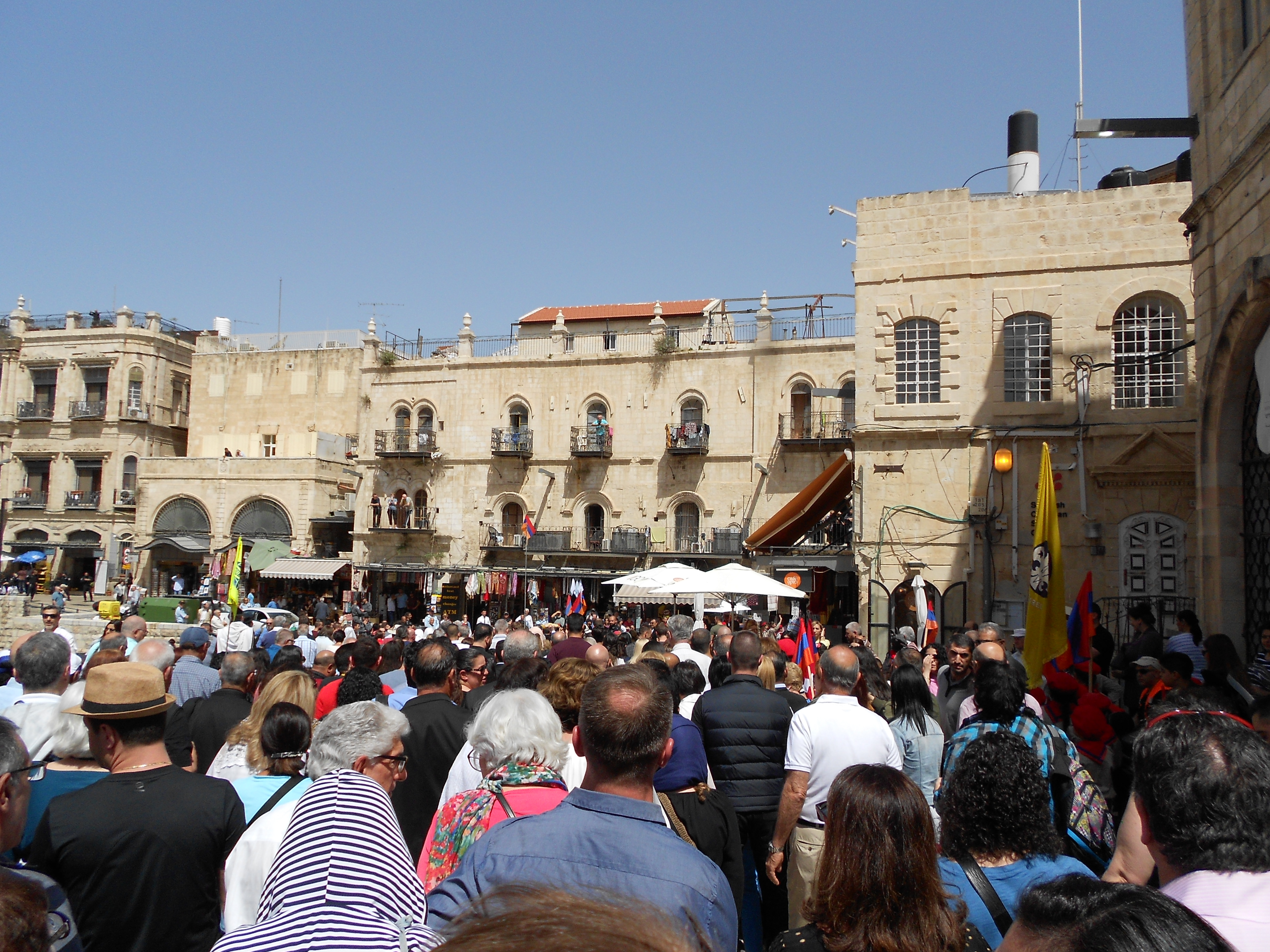

Total population
- 5,000–6,000

Regions with significant populations
- Jerusalem, Haifa, Holon, Nazareth, Bethlehem

Languages
- Armenian; Modern Hebrew; Levantine Arabic

Religion
- Armenian Apostolic Church; Armenian Catholic Church; Armenian Evangelical Church; Judaism

Related ethnic groups
- Armenians

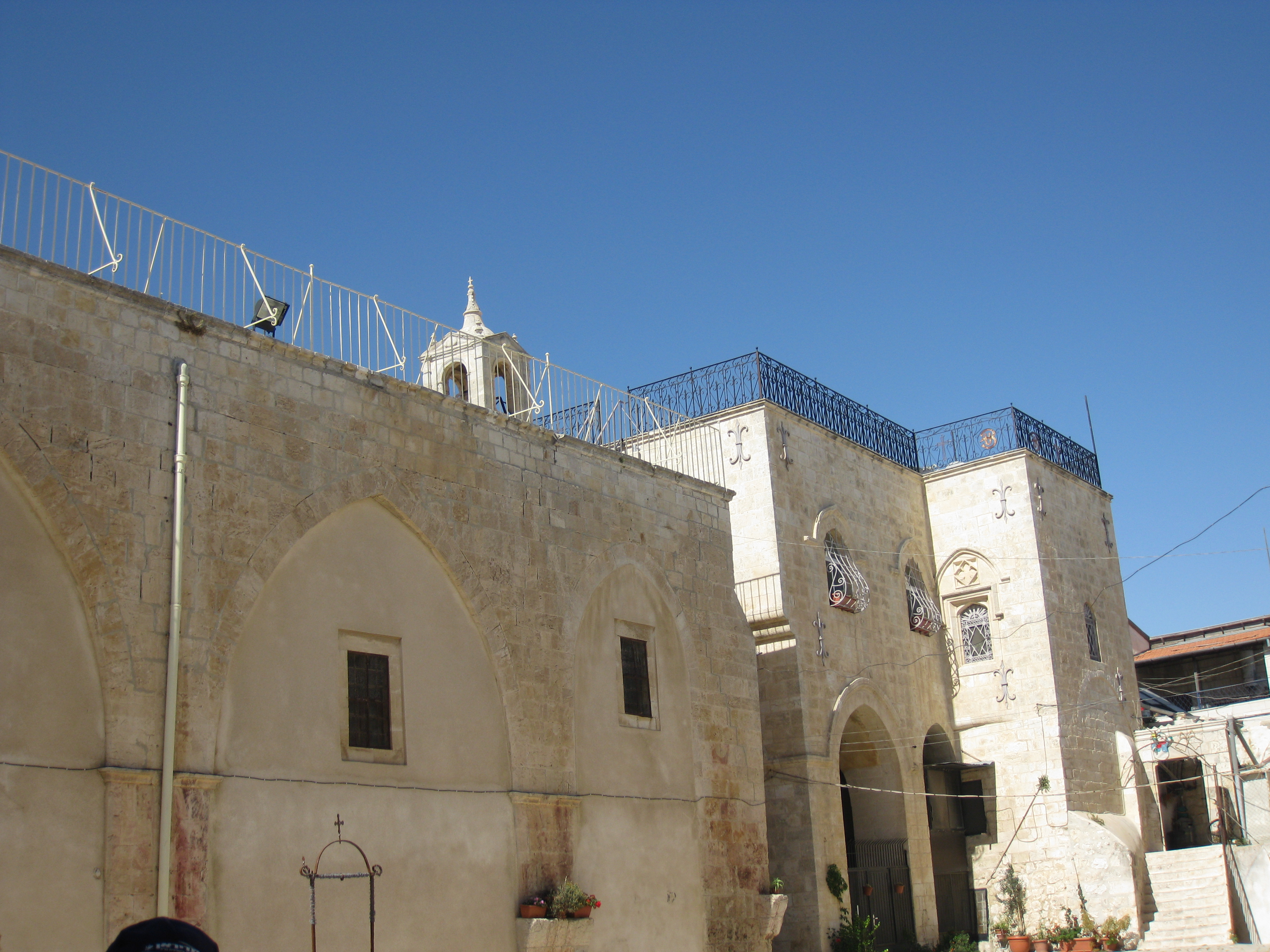
Armenian quarter in the Old City of Jerusalem

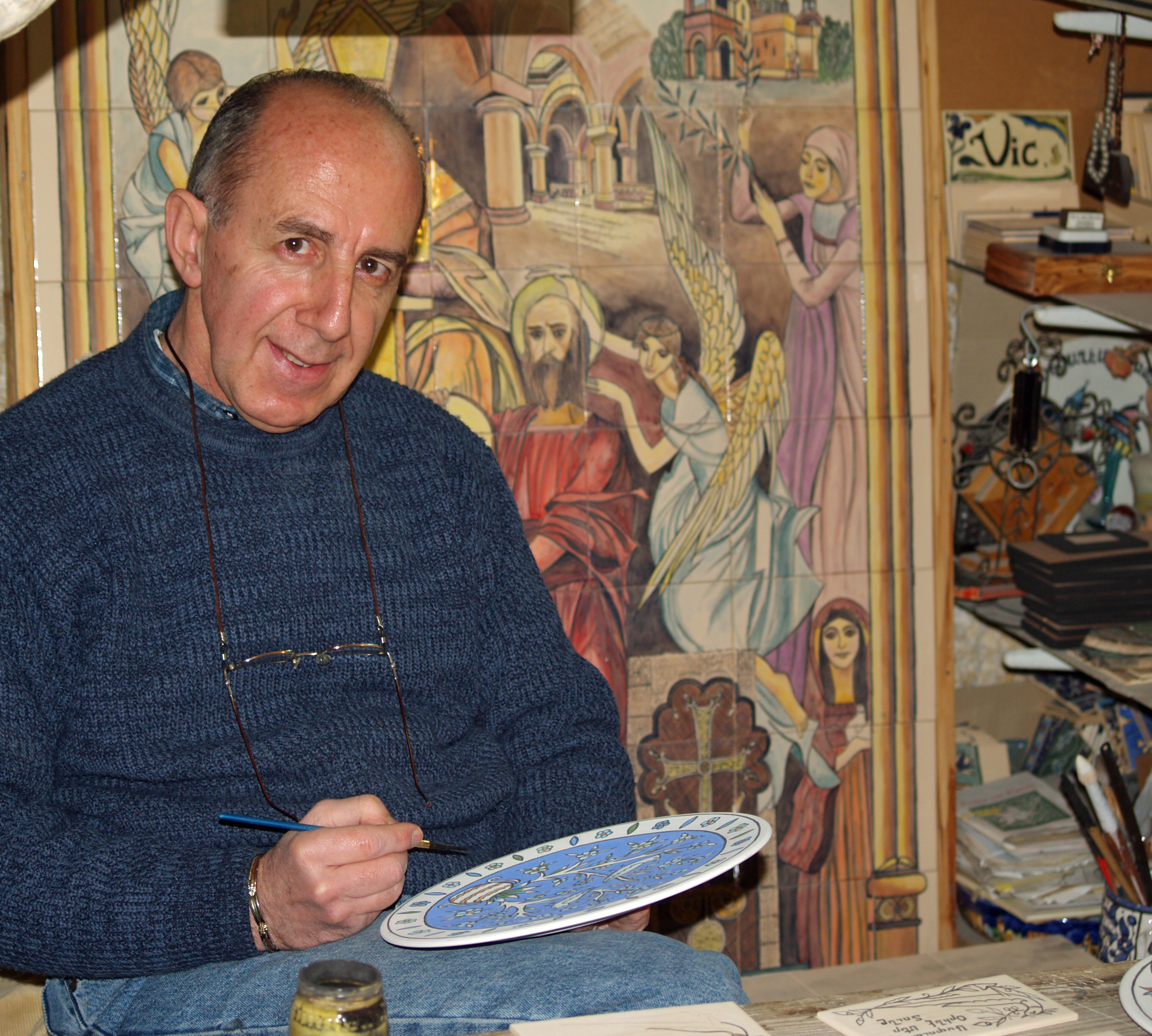
Armenian ceramicist in the Old City of Jerusalem

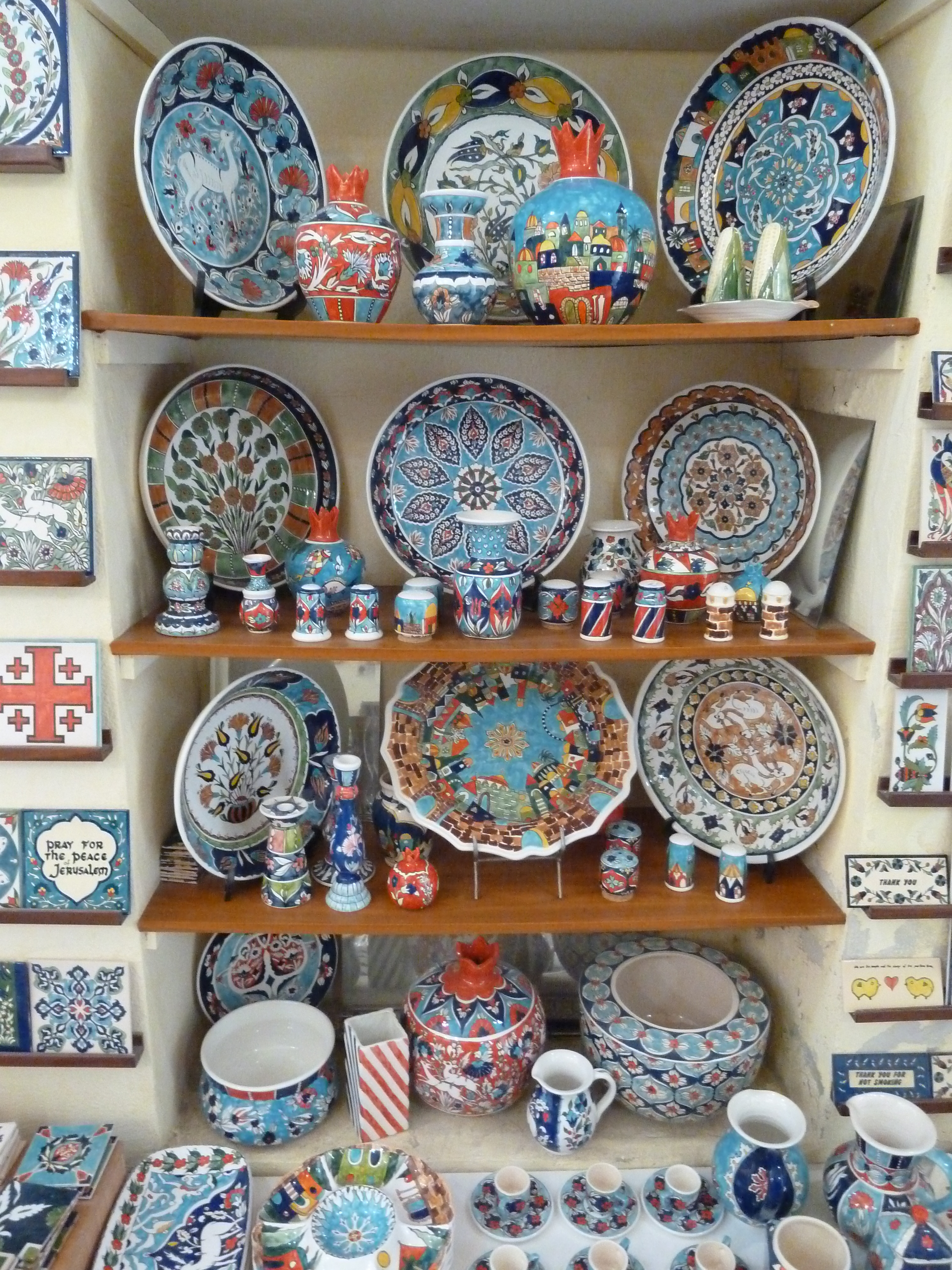
Armenian ceramics in Jerusalem

Armenians in Israel and Palestine (Hebrew: ארמנים; Arabic: أَرْمَنِيُّون) make up a community of approximately 5,000–6,000 Armenians living in Israel and Palestine.

In 1986, it was estimated that 1,500 Armenians lived in the city of Jerusalem. According to a 2006 survey, 790 Armenians lived in Jerusalem's Old City. In 2021, an estimate of approximately 5,000–6,000 Armenians lived across Israel and Palestine.

== History ==
A significant minority of the Armenian community has been resident in the Levant for centuries. Recorded Armenian presence in Israel dates back to the 1st century BCE, when the Armenian king Tigranes the Great made much of Judea a vassal of the Kingdom of Armenia.

=== 4th–18th century ===
Armenian presence in Jerusalem is traditionally linked to the Christianization of Armenia in the early fourth century. The first recorded Armenian pilgrimage to the Holy Land was an Armenian delegation of priests in the early 4th century AD. The visit is alluded to in an Armenian translation of a Greek letter written by Patriarch Macarius of Jerusalem to his contemporary, St. Vrtanes (ruled 333–341).

The Armenian Patriarchate of Jerusalem was established in 638, It is located in the Armenian Quarter, the smallest quarter of the Old City of Jerusalem.

=== Ottoman and British periods ===
==== Photographers ====
Starting in the 1850s Armenians became dominant among Palestine's photographers. The central figure in this development was the leading cleric Esayee Garabedian, who were to become Armenian Patriarch of Jerusalem in 1864–65, and who started photographing in 1857 and established a photography workshop within the St. James monastic compound. There he set up a school for photography, Garabed Krikorian (1847–1920) and his brother Kevork counting among his students. Other 19th-century Armenian photographers from Jerusalem are J. H. Halladjian, M. Mardikian and Yusuf Toumaian. After the Armenian genocide other photographers joined them, including Hrnat Nakashian and Elia Kahvedjian.

Garabed Krikorian opened a photography workshop on Jaffa Road in the 1870s and became himself a teacher, one of his students being Khalil Raad, known as "Palestine's first Arab photographer". Another one of his students, Abraham Guiragossian, worked for the famous Maison Bonfils studio of Beirut and eventually bought it up (see there).

Elia Kahvedjian (1910-1999), a refugee of the Armenian genocide, was one of the leading photographers in Jerusalem at the beginning of the 20th century. Kegham Djeghalian (1915–1981), another Armenian genocide refugee survivor, opened Gaza's first photography studio in 1944.

==== Ceramicists ====
Many Armenians from Kütahya, a city in Turkey, were known for their hand-painted ceramic wares and tiles. In 1919, several master craftsmen were brought to Jerusalem to renovate the tiles covering the facade of the Dome of the Rock. They remained in Jerusalem and developed the art of Armenian ceramics.

==== Armenian Genocide refugees ====
Although the Armenian ecclesiastical presence in Jerusalem dates to late antiquity, the modern community was significantly reshaped in the early 20th century. The arrival of Armenian refugees in Jerusalem followed the Armenian genocide of 1915–1917, carried out under the Young Turk government during the final years of the Ottoman Empire. The genocide formed part of the wider wartime violence and population policies that accompanied the empire’s collapse. Around 10.000 refugees settled around the Armenian Patriarchate of Jerusalem, and the St. James monastic compound, contributing to the transformation of the Armenian Quarter from a primarily monastic and pilgrimage center into a residential community.

During the First World War, the Armenian Theological Seminary in Jerusalem ceased operating after its students were recruited by the Ottoman authorities in 1917. The building stood empty until 1922, when the Armenian Patriarchate opened orphanages there for children who had survived the Armenian Genocide. According to the Times of Israel, 616 boys found refuge in the former seminary, one of whom later became Armenian Patriarch of Jerusalem.

In 1922, Armenian refugees fleeing the collapse of French-controlled Cilicia reached the Palestinian coast, particularly Haifa, but were initially barred from entering by the British authorities. According to historian George Hintlian, Arab notables in Palestine protested the decision, after which the refugees were allowed to disembark. The Arab village chief of Sheikh Breik then offered free land to Armenian refugees, who established the village of Athlit near Haifa. Some members of the Jewish Yishuv were also aware of and responded to the Armenian Genocide. The Nili intelligence network, a pro-British Jewish espionage group active in Ottoman Palestine during the First World War, recorded information about the persecution of Armenians and attempted to bring it to British attention. Sarah Aaronsohn, one of Nili’s leading figures, had witnessed the effects of the genocide while travelling from Istanbul to Haifa, an experience that led to her decision to assist the British against the Ottoman authorities.

==== Demographics under British rule ====
The 1922 census of Palestine lists 3,210 Christians as members of Armenian churches, 271 being Armenian Catholic (176 in Jerusalem-Jaffa, 10 in Samaria, and 85 in Northern) and 2,939 being Armenian Apostolic (11 in Southern, 2,800 in Jerusalem-Jaffa, eight in Samaria, and 120 in Northern) along with 2,970 Armenian speakers, including 2,906 in municipal areas (2,442 in Jerusalem, 216 in Jaffa, 101 in Haifa, four in Gaza, 13 in Nablus, one in Safad, 20 in Nazareth, 13 in Ramleh, one in Tiberias, 37 in Bethlehem, 25 in Acre, four in Tulkarem, 21 in Ramallah, six in Jenin, one in Beersheba, and one in Baisan).

=== Israeli–Palestinian conflict ===
==== 1948–1967 ====
After the 1948 Arab–Israeli War and the establishment of the State of Israel, a number of Armenians residing in what had been the British Mandate of Palestine took up Israeli citizenship, whereas other Armenian residents of Old City of Jerusalem and the territory captured by Jordan received Jordanian nationality. Two groups of Armenians emerged: Armenians with Israeli citizenship living within the borders of the state and Armenians with Jordanian nationality in Jerusalem's Armenian Quarter and the rest of Jordanian West Bank.

==== After 1967 ====
After the 1967 Six-Day War, the Armenian population, especially in East Jerusalem and the West Bank, experienced a decrease in its numbers because of emigration. Armenians of Jerusalem were provided with Israeli resident status and some applied for citizenship. As of 2023, about 2,000 Armenians were residents but not citizens of Israeli-controlled territory and were stateless persons.

In 1983, tensions arose within the Armenian Quarter of Jerusalem, when Patriarch Yeshighe Derderian replaced Archbishop Shahe Ajamian. Violence erupted in June 1986, when a group of Armenian Patriarch Derderian's supporters attacked another Armenian family, which was well known for its anti-Patriarch views and as a result one man was killed and six others were injured in a street battle that church representatives dubbed "a fight between two families."

As of 2023, the Armenian community around the Old City's Armenian Quarter has been shrinking. Activists claimed that its continued survival was threatened by a controversial land deal that could result in the loss of Armenian control over 25% of the Armenian Quarter.

== Demographics ==
In 1986, it was estimated that 1,500 Armenians lived in the city of Jerusalem. According to a 2006 survey, 790 Armenians lived in Jerusalem's Old City. In 2022, an estimate of approximately 5,000–6,000 Armenians lived across Israel and Palestine.

There are a few Russian-speaking Jews from Armenia in Israel, but they are classified within the former USSR Aliyah, so no precise statistics are available prior to 1991 when Armenia restored its independence from the USSR.

== Religion ==
The overwhelming majority of Armenians in Israel are Armenian Orthodox Christians, along with a small number of Catholics and Evangelicals. The Armenian Orthodox remain under the jurisdiction of the Armenian Patriarchate of Jerusalem and the residing Patriarch, in spiritual connection with the Armenian Apostolic Church (See of Holy Etchmiadzin), whereas the Armenian Catholics are under the jurisdiction of the Armenian Catholic Church and Patriarchal Vicar (residing at Via Dolorosa 41 – Fourth Station).

The Churches belonging to the Armenian Apostolic Church are among others St. Elias Church in Haifa and Saint Nicholas Church and Monastery in Jaffa. Armenian-Israelis also pray in St. James Cathedral (Surpotz Hagopyants) at the Armenian Patriarchate of Jerusalem, at the Church of the Holy Sepulchre in Jerusalem (under joint jurisdiction of Armenian Church with other Christian churches), the Tomb of Virgin Mary and Gethsemane, the Chapel of the Ascension on Mount of Olives, the Church of St. Gregory the Enlightener in modern Jerusalem, and the Church of the Nativity in Bethlehem (again under joint jurisdiction of the Armenian Church and other Christian churches). The Armenian Church also has the St George Monastery in Ramle. Armenians in Israel and Palestine celebrate Christmas and the Epiphany on the same day, which is traditionally on January 19, while Armenian Orthodox communities in Armenia and worldwide celebrate on January 6. This is because the Armenian Patriarchate of Jerusalem still abides by the ancient Julian calendar, whereas the Armenian Apostolic Church has adopted the Gregorian calendar. Armenian Catholics, Evangelical and Brethren churches in Israel celebrate Christmas on December 25, in line with other members of the Roman Catholic and various Protestant churches.

== Language and culture ==
The Institute of African and Asian Studies at the Hebrew University of Jerusalem established a chair of Armenian Studies program, specialising in study of Armenian language, literature, history and culture as well as the Armenian genocide. The Program of Armenian Studies at the Hebrew University of Jerusalem has also served as a site of Armenian–Jewish cultural exchange. At a 2019 Armenian Genocide memorial event organized by the program, Armenia’s foreign minister Zohrab Mnatsakanyan, described Armenians and Jews as peoples sharing “not just long history, but the deep pain of persecution and identity based organized mass murder”.

=== Museums and cultural institutions ===
The Edward and Helen Mardigian Armenian Museum is located in the Armenian Convent in the Old City of Jerusalem, in the former Armenian Theological Seminary building that later housed the Armenian Genocide orphanage. Its collections present Armenian history in Jerusalem through mosaics, ecclesiastical objects, manuscripts, and material connected to the orphanage.

== Armenia–Israel relations ==
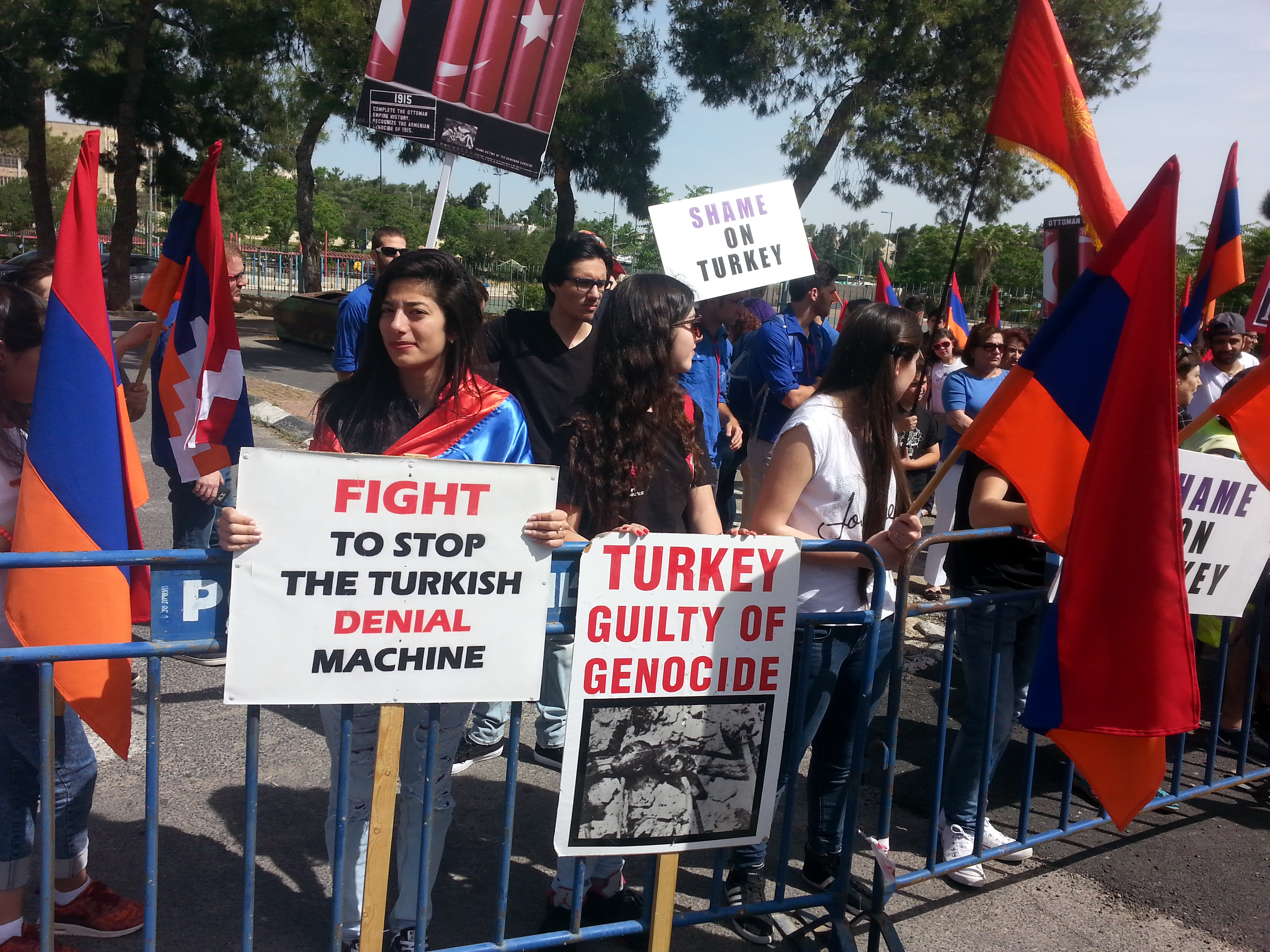
Armenians protesting for recognition of the Armenian genocide in front of the Turkish consulate in Jerusalem. The protest was held on Armenian Genocide Remembrance Day of 2016.

Armenia maintains diplomatic relations with Israel. According to the CIA World Factbook, Armenia receives 4.8% of its imports from Israel, while Israel receives 7.1% of Armenia's exports. Although both countries have diplomatic relations, neither maintains an embassy in the other country. Instead, Ambassador Ehud Moshe Eytam, the Israeli ambassador to Armenia is based in Tbilisi, Georgia, and visits Yerevan twice a month. In Jerusalem Tsolag Momjian is the honorary consul.

Since Armenia's independence, Israeli politicians, rabbis, and the country's Armenian community have called on the Israeli government to recognize the Armenian genocide. Turkey has threatened to break off ties with Israel if it or the United States recognized the killings as genocide. As of 2008, there has been an ongoing debate regarding recognition in the Knesset, with Turkey lobbying to prevent it. A 2007 survey found that more than 70% of Israelis thought that Israel should recognize the genocide, with 44% willing to break off relations with Turkey over the issue.

== See also ==
- Armenia–Israel relations
- Armenian Quarter, Jerusalem
- History of the Jews in Armenia
- Religion in Israel
  - Christianity in Israel
