= To the American Indian =

1916 book Lucy Thompson

To The American Indian: Reminisces of a Yurok Woman is a 1916 book by Native American author and Yurok woman Lucy Thompson. The book received the American Book Award in 1992, long after her death in 1932. The book was written with the intent of preserving and remembering her people's stories. To the American Indian has 32 chapters, each of which relates stories about the Yurok people. The book is written in a combination of Yurok and English.

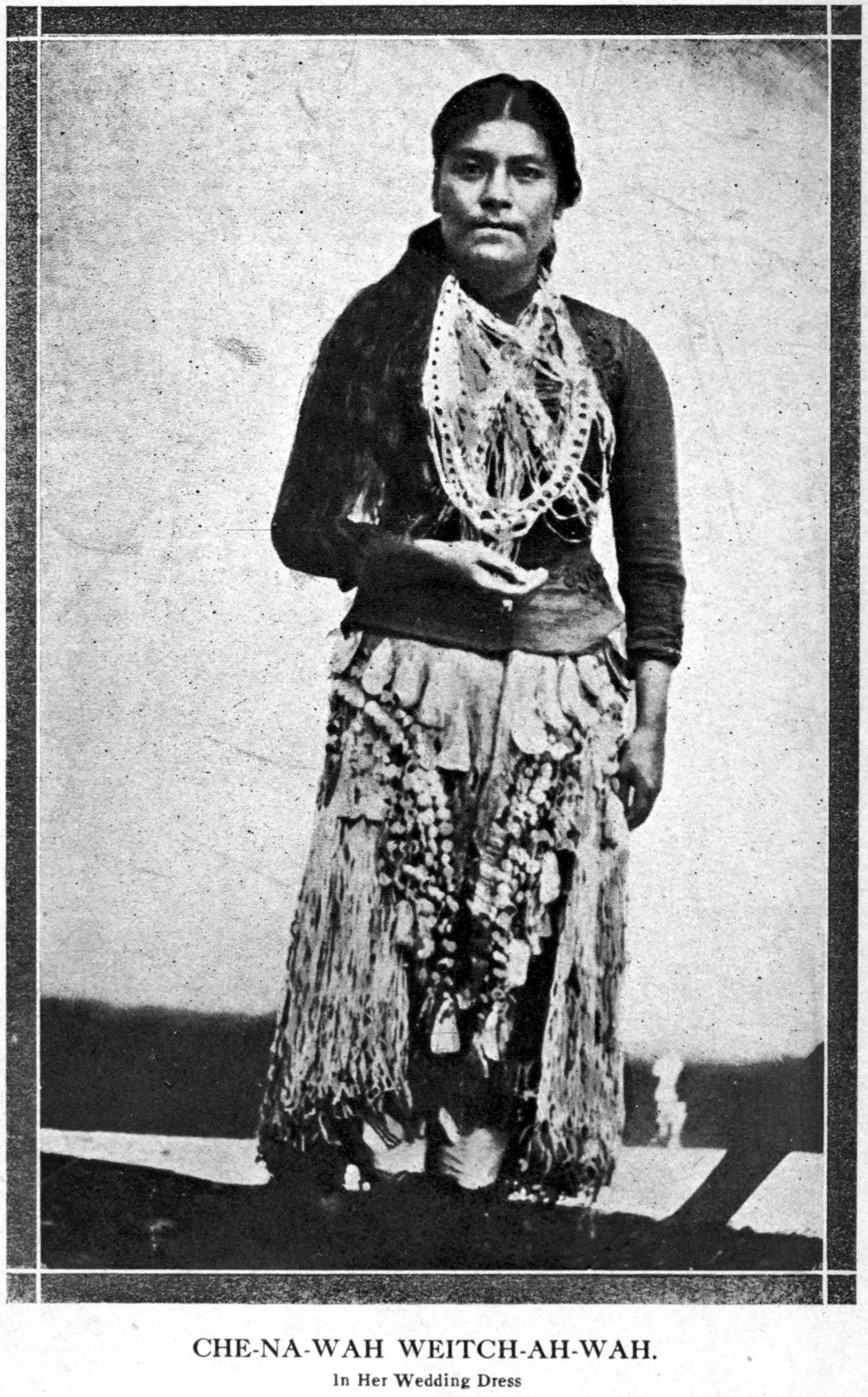
Lucy Thompson, Author of 1916 book To The American Indian

== Ceremonies and tradition ==
In To the American Indian, Thompson describes the process of becoming a Yurok Talth, similar to a doctor, shaman, or spiritual leader. According to her, the majority of Talths are young and belong to families of wealth or status. Becoming a Talth, she says, requires a ceremony involving teaching one to smoke and being commenced at a sweat house. Wearing traditional, heavy clothes and with a bare chest, a young woman enters the sweat house and joins in song, smoking, and dancing until exhaustion, when the special meal can commence. Becoming a young Talth is a rigorous process, involving ceremonial events that last years and traditional exercises and challenges of the mind and body.

== Yurok "slavery" (Yurok Ki-elth) ==
The word "slave" or "slavery" shows up in To the American Indian about 29 times, along with being the title of one chapter. The meaning of slavery used by Thompson, however, is notably different from the more well-known chattel slavery of African peoples throughout American history. She describes how “the natives of Yurok went to the dwellings of the whites, to ask for a home for their native families, and they were welcomed and treated like their own family by white people", and how "slavery was brought about by wars, famines, and contagious diseases". Thompson says in such times, "They [poor families] would go to some rich man's house and offer themselves as slaves, and these offers were usually accepted". In Thompson's Yurok culture, slavery is described as poor Native American people (usually Klamath or Hoopa) who go to wealthier white people or Native Americans asking for a house and sustenance.

== Tobacco ==
Tobacco plays an important role in tradition and ceremonies in the Yurok tribes, according to Thompson. Tobacco harvesting is frugal and particular and despite how much they smoke, they never let themselves be taken hold of by the tight grasp a tobacco habit brings. Women rarely ever smoke, but they take part in the packing of pipes and farming of the plants. Women Tlaths, however, take from the pipe daily and before bed, as the men of the tribe do. There are specific traditional ways of cultivating tobacco, holding it, and smoking it that the tribe is sensitive and ceremonious about each day and night.

== Reception ==
In a 1991 foreword to the book, Peter E. Palmquist, photographer and historian of Native American history, describes how he was initially skeptical of To The American Indian, neglecting it several times before comprehending how important the stories are. He notes that his job was to listen to the hard and fascinating truth of the culture Lucy Thompson was dedicated on telling.

== Awards ==
In 1992, To the American Indian won the American Book Award.
