= Oketo =

Oketo can refer to:

- Oketo, Hokkaidō, Japan
- Oketo, California, United States
- Oketo, Kansas, United States
- Oketo (band), indie rock band from Lincoln, NE
