= Kim Timby =

American-French photography historian and cultural anthropologist

Kim Timby (born 1970 in California, United States) is a photography historian based in Paris who teaches at the École du Louvre and works as a curator for a private collection specialising in international nineteenth-century photography. From her research and teaching, Timby writes on the cultural history of photography as a technology.

== Education ==
Timby's research draws on her learning, and combines her interests, in anthropology, history and photography. Her early experience of the medium was through her maternal grandmother, who had a darkroom and was active in her local photo club and showed her how to print in the darkroom. Her first camera was a high school graduation gift.

Timby was educated at the private Connecticut College, New London, where as an Anthropology undergraduate she undertook a minor subject studio arts, studying photography and making photographs in the vintage processes of cyanotype and gum printing. From there she graduated with a Bachelor of Arts in Social Anthropology in 1992 before completing an M.A. in that discipline in 1996 at the École des Hautes Études en Sciences Sociales, France, and from 2002 to 2006 undertook her PhD at the same Paris institution.

== Career ==
Timby's Master's thesis was "La photographie et l'ethnologie de la France. Modes d'emploi et apports de l'image" (‘Photography and the ethnology of France. Uses and contributions of the image’) dealing with the usefulness of photography to museums of French ethnography and how photography was employed by anthropologists in their field work and publications in studying French culture or as object of study in its own right. This research shifted her interest from traditional anthropology toward history, taking her into the history of photography, where her anthropology guides her consideration of its cultural impact.

Timby's research subsequent to her master's degree and her interest in photographic technologies and their social utility and impact stem also from her work as a curator. From 1996 to 2001 she was employed in that role at the Musée Carnavalet, the museum of the history of Paris, a city so closely associated with the progress of photography from its invention.

There she prepared exhibitions including "Paris in 3D: from Stereoscopy to Virtual Reality, 1850-2000”, an exercise in configuring rigorous academic archival research for general consumption.

Timby had first become interested in stereography when working with the photography historian Peter Palmquist for a month in the early 1990s as an undergraduate in the US. His study of original photographs and primary source materials to uncover overlooked aspects of the history of photography chimed with her background in anthropology and as an historian. Palmquist took her to an antique shop in Arcata (California) where he lived, and there she bought her first stereo view.

Timby was able to find temporary work that engaged her interest in photography and anthropology at the Musée de l’Homme photography department and Musée Carnavalet specialising in the history of Paris. In 1996 she began co-curating a 3D exhibition at the Carnavalet museum, and the resultant display opened in Paris in October 2000 and closed January 2001. The exhibition and catalogue in English and in French ( “Paris en 3D: de la stéréoscopie à la réalité virtuelle, 1850-2000”) in hardbound editions, appealed to a diverse audience who, using the different stereo viewers enclosed in the book, could enjoy hundreds of images, stereo pairs, anaglyphs, lenticular images and holograms, of Parisian life from the early nineteenth century to the present. Timby contributed text that one reviewer called an ‘historical roadmap of the techniques leading to the development of 3D photography from stereocards, anaglyphs, and holograms to 3D computer imagery and virtual reality’. The book and exhibition were of ‘landmark’ historical value, in the opinion of another reviewer, with many of its pictures showing antique equipment and portraits of pioneers of stereoscopy and integrated biographical information and excerpts of treatises of prominent persons in stereoscopy. In the opinion of David Haberstich, the exhibition was ‘definitive’ in dealing with perception, art, and technology.

In 2001, with a training and research grant from the Ministry of Culture and Communication (photographic patrimony) for access to patents, and by the Carnavalet museum as part of her work on the exhibition "Paris in 3D: de stereoscopy to virtual reality, 1850-2000 ", Timby published a 23-page academic paper on research into commercial, advertising, entertainment, and even medical and religious, applications of the lenticular image invention in France, and its technical development.

== Investigation into 3D and colour photography ==
When researching 3D imaging Timby found that colour was a major consideration, a thread that developed during her PhD on lenticular photography, begun after "Paris in 3D" closed and she had left Carnavalet. Her first published work on colour was the 2005 article "Colour Photography and Stereoscopy: Parallel Histories," from which she developed the idea that colour, like 3D, was a constructed illusion; an ambition in common to the two technologies was the reproduction of an aspect of human perception through its deconstruction and reconstruction.”

Also in 2005, before the completion in 2006 of her PhD at the Paris École des Hautes Etudes en Sciences Sociales (EHESS), Timby was appointed Director of Collections at the Musée Nicéphore Niépce in Chalon-sur-Saône, France which houses the archive of devices and objects once belonging to the inventor of photography as well as nearly three million images from all photographic processes.

There, her work included curating "Sous un beau ciel bleu: un siècle de couleurs et de photographie" (June 17–October 1, 2006), augmenting the second strand of her research interests, colour photography, into the technological, aesthetic, and social history in which she has since pursued investigations alongside stereoscopy. Timby's other projects at the Musée Nicéphore Niépce included designing and implementing new permanent exhibition spaces structured around a rotating series of mini-exhibits, thus continuing her informed engagement with a broad audience.

Timby elaborates a cultural history of photography by examining human engagement with, and transformation of, its particular techniques and technologies, as she does with the photo-booth, precursor to the ‘selfie-stick’, in her paper “Photographies d’amitié. De l’usage collectif du photomaton,” (‘Photographs of friendships: the collective use of the photo booth’). For the same purpose, she tracks the mid-century development of colour printing technologies for magazine photographs as a response to audiences’ and advertisers’ desire, and the adaptation of photographers, amateur and professional, to its availability and special demands.

== Researching animated photography ==
In a move to alma mater École des Hautes Etudes en Sciences Sociales in 2009, and until 2012, Timby co-coordinated investigation in "La Création Photographique", a research program in the history of photography funded by the Agence Nationale de la Recherche.

During this period she published a chapter 'Le cinéma dans une seule photo' : le portrait animé des années 1910’, a contribution to a collection of essays on the crossover between cinema and the still image, also reproduced as ‘Cinema in a Single Photo: The Animated Screen Portrait of the 1910s’ in an English edition. Her text first raises the way that lenticular animation, in novelty portraits and advertising, satisfied an expectation of progress toward ever more perceptual naturalism in photographic technologies, and this was expanded in the second chapter of her book 3D and Animated Lenticular Photography: Between Utopia and Entertainment, published in 2015.

Response to the book was positive and recognised the value of Timby's contribution to the literature on lenticular imagery which in comparison to the history and analysis of other 3D technologies had received little attention.

== Teaching ==
Alongside the research affiliation with the EHESS where she was also in charge of a postgraduate seminar, Timby was a professor at the Paris College of Art from January 2010 to the end of 2012, and is currently, since 2005, professor responsible for the École du Louvre's intensive 3-year History of Photography survey course.

== Bibliography ==
=== Books ===
- 3D and Animated Lenticular Photography: Between Utopia and Entertainment (Berlin: De Gruyter, 2015 ISBN 978-3-11-041306-9)

=== Chapters in books ===
- Timby, Kim (2026-01-20), Adamson, Natalie; Taws, Richard (eds.), "Building the "Museum Without Walls": Innovations in Photographic Art Reproduction in France, 1860–1960", A Companion to French Art (1 ed.), Wiley, pp. 467–489, doi:10.1002/9781119370505.ch25, ISBN 978-1-119-37046-8
- Timby, Kim (2025). "La palette du papier salé". In Boulouch, Nathalie; Désiré dit Gosset, Gilles (eds.). Que fait la couleur à la photographie ? techniques, usages, controverses [actes du] Colloque de Cerisy, [19-23 août 2020]. Centre culturel international, Médiathèque du patrimoine et de la photographie. Paris: Lienart Médiathèque du patrimoine et de la photographie. ISBN 978-2-35906-453-7.
- Timby, Kim (2021). "Origine des Plaques de Projection Photographiques". In Guerin, Patrice (ed.). Projections lumineuses Molteni : Radiguet & Massiot successeurs. 2, Vues et conférences (in French). Écully: Club Niépce lumière. pp. 172–187. ISBN 9791091258135. OCLC 1315539890.
- Face à la couleur : une histoire en creux du noir et blanc, in Bibliothèque Nationale de France, Aubenas, Sylvie, Conesa, Héloïse, Triebel, Flora, Versavel, Dominique (2020). Noir & blanc une esthétique de la photographie: collection de la Bibliothèque Nationale de France (in French). Réunion des musées nationaux. ISBN 978-2-7118-7522-1. OCLC 1226329965.
- “The Colors of Black-and-White Photography,” in The Colors of Photography (forthcoming, Berlin: De Gruyter, 2019).
- “Photography, Cinema, and Perceptual Realism in the Nineteenth Century,” in Simone Natale and Nicoletta Leonardi, eds., Photography and Other Media in the Nineteenth Century: Towards an Integrated History (University Park: Penn State University Press, 2018), 176–190.
- “Faire ‘plus beau que nature’ : la construction culturelle des illusions stéréoscopiques en photographie,” in Miguel Almiron, Esther Jacopin and Giusy Pisano, eds., Stéréoscopie et Illusion. Archéologie et pratiques contemporaines: photographie, cinéma, arts numériques (Villeneuve-d’Ascq: Presses universitaires du Septentrion, 2018), 141–155.
- “Look at those Lollipops! Integrating Color into News Pictures,” in Vanessa Schwartz and Jason Hill, eds., Getting the Picture. The History and Visual Culture of the News (London: Bloomsbury, 2015), 236–43.
- “Photographies d’amitié. De l’usage collectif du photomaton,” coauthored with Nora Mathys, in Clément Chéroux and Sam Stourdze, eds., Derrière le rideau. L’esthétique du photomaton (Arles: Photosynthèses, 2012), 273–281.
- “Cinema in a Single Photo: the Animated Screen Portrait of the 1910s,” in Olivier Lugon and Laurent Guido, eds., Between Still and Moving Images: Photography and Cinema in the 20th Century (New Barnet, UK: John Libbey Publishing, 2012), 97–111.
- “Le cinéma dans une seule photo: le portrait animé des années 1910,” in Olivier Lugon and Laurent Guido, eds., Fixe/Animé. Croisements de la photographie et du cinéma au XXe siècle (Lausanne: Éditions L’Âge d’Homme, 2010), 117–31.
- Paris in 3D, from Stereoscopy to Virtual Reality, 1850–2000. French edition: Paris en 3D, de la stéréoscopie à la réalité virtuelle, 1850–2000 (London/Paris: Booth-Clibborn/Paris-Musées, 2000). Co-editor with Françoise Reynaud and Catherine Tambrun.
- “The Inventors of 3D Photography in France. Patents 1852–1922.” In F. Reynaud, C. Tambrun et K. Timby (eds.), Paris in 3D (2000), 158–64.

=== Articles ===
- “The Invention of the Myth of Total Photography,” International Journal on Stereo & Immersive Media, vol. 2, no. 1, January 2019.
- “Spectaculaire, réfléchie : la photographie en couleurs au prisme de la presse française, 1945–1960,” Focales, no. 1, June 2017.
- “Glass Transparencies: Marketing Photography’s Luminosity and Precision,” PhotoResearcher, no. 25, Photography in the Marketplace (Spring 2016), 7–24.
- “Colour Photography and Stereoscopy: Parallel Histories,” History of Photography, vol. 29, no. 2 (Summer 2005): 183–96.
- “Images en relief et images changeantes. La photographie à réseau ligné,” Études photographiques, no. 9 (May 2001): 124–47.

==== Book reviews ====
- "L’histoire de la photographie prend des couleurs," Perspective. La revue de l'INHA, Apr 2009
- "Color Rush // Color: American Photography Transformed // Twentieth-Century Color Photographs: Identification and Care," Review of three recent books on the history of color photography, History of Photography 39:1 (February 2015)
- "Kevin Moore, Starburst: Color Photography in America 1970-1980" (Hatje Cantz, 2010) History of Photography 35:2, 2011
- "Technologies of Photography: review of Sean F. Johnston, Holographic Visions, and Pamela Roberts, A Century of Colour Photography," History of Photography 33:4, 2009
- "On the Materiality of Images: review of Elizabeth Edwards and Janice Hart, eds.", History of Photography 30:3, 2006
