= Armenians in Haifa =

Armenians and Armenian Jews living in Haifa, Israel

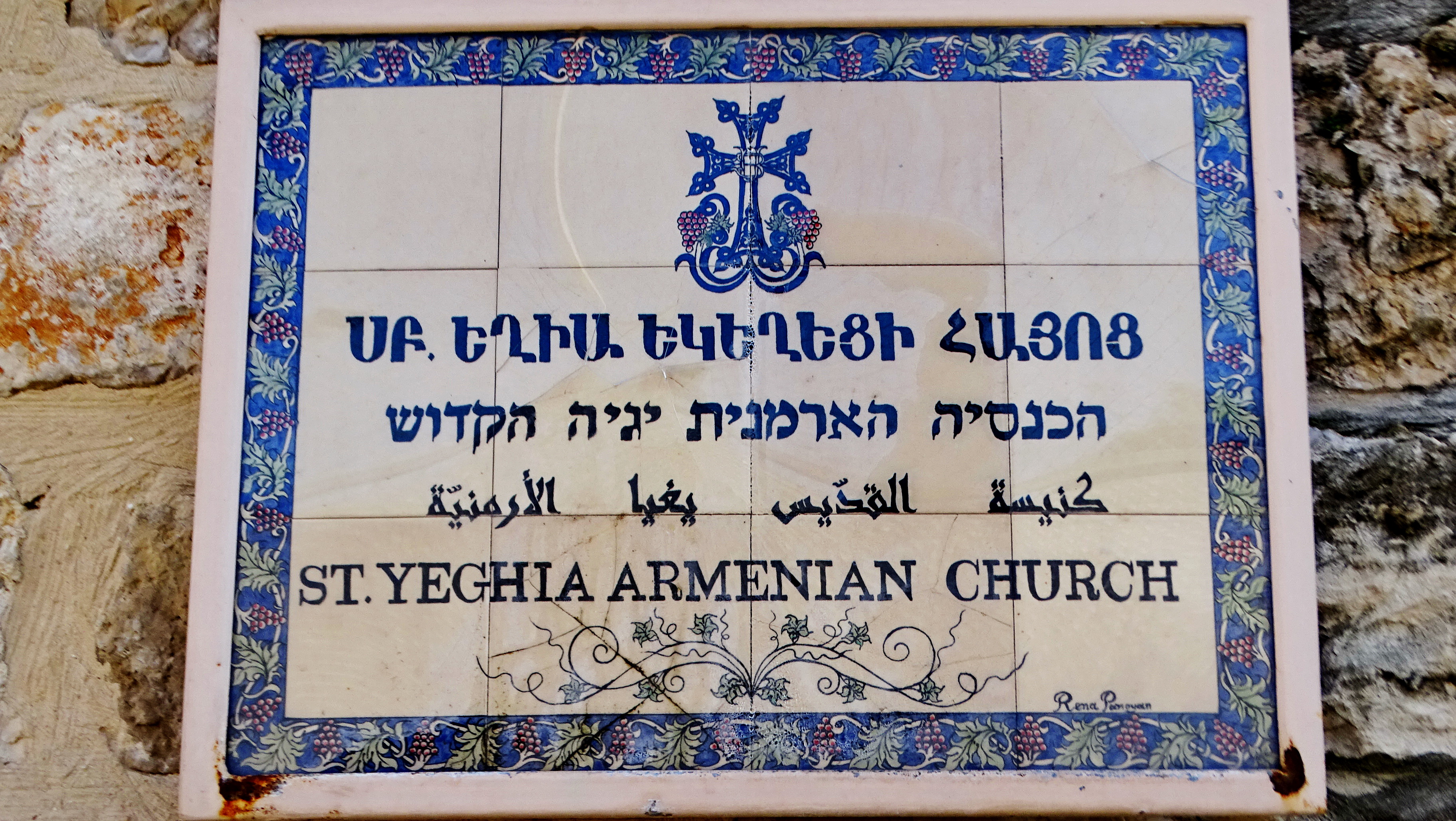

Total population
- 1,500

Languages
- Armenian; Hebrew; Levantine Arabic

Religion
- Armenian Apostolic Church; Armenian Catholic Church; Armenian Evangelical Church; Judaism

Related ethnic groups
- Other Armenians and Armenian Jews

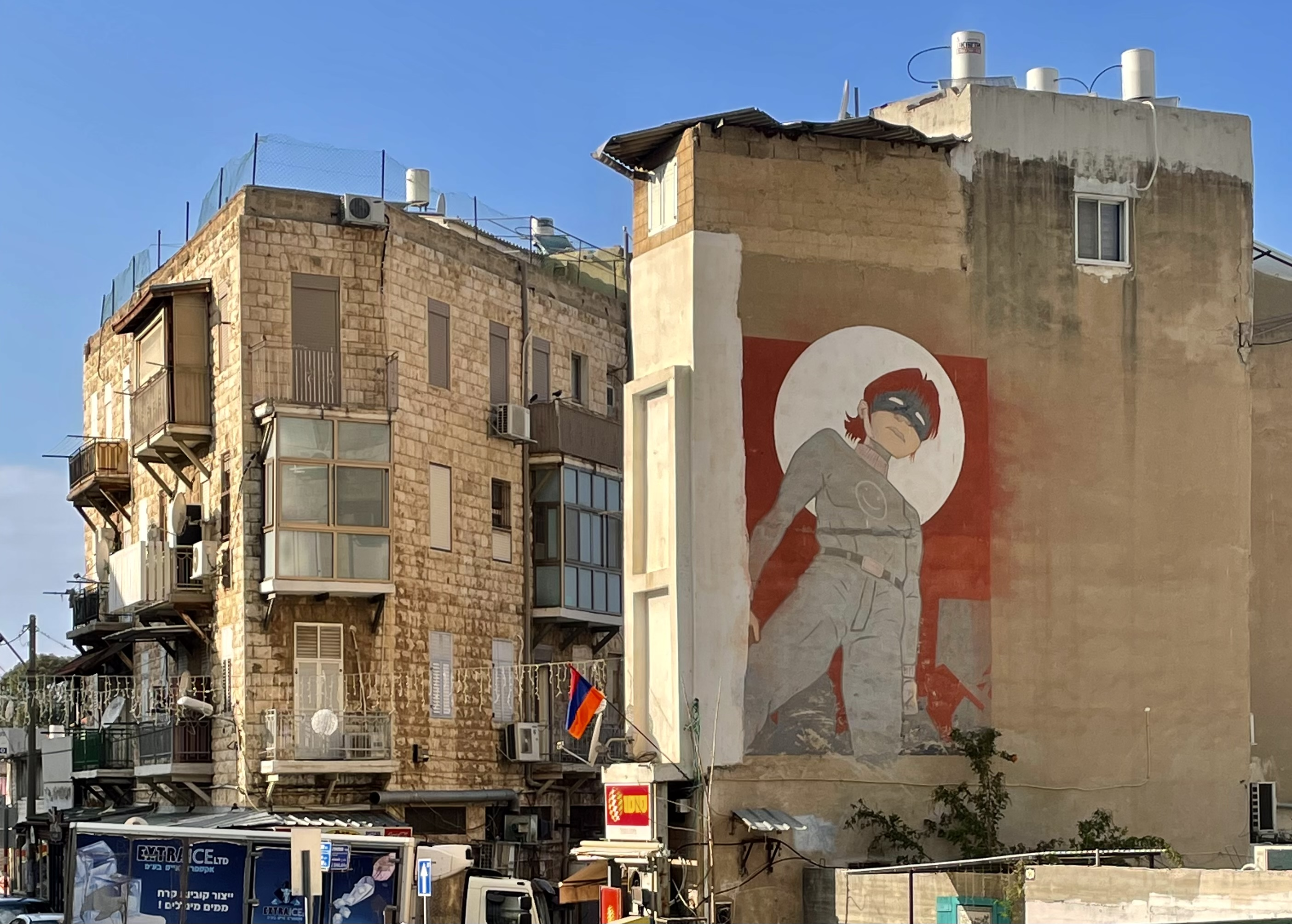
Armenian flag by a grocery store on Khuri Street in Wadi Nisnas, Haifa

The Armenians of Haifa are a local community within the larger Armenian diaspora in Israel. They number around 1,500 people or 0.5% of the city's total population.

== History ==
Haifa, a port city in what once was Mandatory Palestine, accepted thousands of Armenian refugees who were fleeing the Ottoman Empire after the Armenian genocide. Significant influx of Armenian refugees began in the 1920s and their population peaked at 6 to 8 thousand people. At some point, most buildings on Khuri Street in the majority-Arab Christian quarter Wadi Nisnas were inhabited by ethnic Armenians. Today, a few hundred of these refugees' descendants still live in Haifa. However, a majority of today's Armenian population of Haifa come from a later wave of immigrants from Armenia proper who moved to Israel after the dissolution of the Soviet Union. Most of them belonged to mixed Armenian-Jewish families that were allowed to immigrate under the Law of Return. Some of the former residents of the abandoned Armenian village Sheikh Brak in rural Haifa District now, too, live in Haifa city proper.

== Wadi Nisnas ==
While mixed Armenian families can be found in various majority-Jewish districts all around the city and its suburbs, Wadi Nisnas that is home to the older refugee community continues to be the center of Haifa's Armenian life. The Saint Yeghia Armenian Apostolic church that was built between 1925 and 1928 at the corner of Hana Nakara Alley and Khuri Street remains the only Armenian congregation in the city. It is headed by father Dirayr Hovakimyan who immigrated to Israel from Armenia around 2005. Wadi Nisnas is also home to a branch of the Armenian sports and scouting organization Homenetmen on HaZionut Avenue, an Armenian-owned grocery store and an Armenian ceramics art studio, both on Khuri Street.
