= Sheikh Brak =

Sheikh Brak: שייח' בראק (Hebrew)
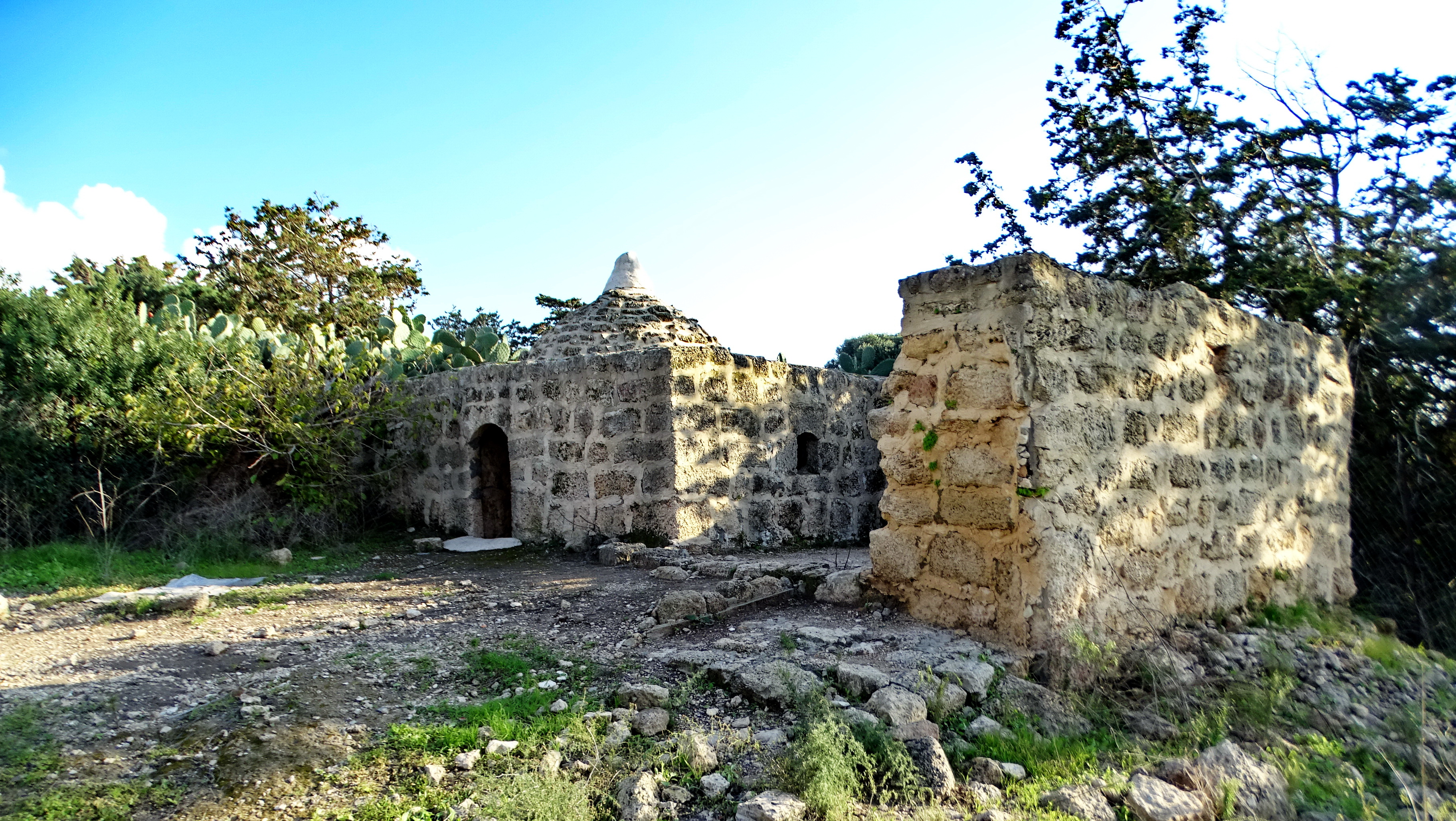

- Location within Haifa region of Israel Location within Israel
- Coordinates: 32°40′22″N 34°56′25″E
- Country: Israel
- District: Haifa
- Council: Hof HaCarmel
- Founded: 1920
- Founder: Armenian refugees

Sheikh Brak (Hebrew: שייח' בראק) was an Armenian village near the town of Atlit in Haifa District of Israel. It should not be confused with the Palestinian Arab village of Sheikh Abreik.

== History ==
Sheikh Brak was founded in 1920 when several dozen families of Armenian refugees came to Mandatory Palestine fleeing the Ottoman Empire after the Armenian genocide and leased land from a local Arab Christian landowner. When the landowner fled to Lebanon during the 1948 Palestinian expulsion and flight, village lands were distributed to nearby kibbutzim, but the Armenian residents continued living in their formally unrecognized settlement with no connection to the electricity grid and other facilities. Young people were gradually leaving the village to marry outside the community and look for work in bigger cities such as Haifa and Tel Aviv. In 1981, some of the local Armenian families left the village after neighboring settlements started blocking the roads to the village and the authorities supplying the town with salty water. The last family to leave were the Lafajians who did so in 1980s, leaving the village uninhabited. Today, only a small Armenian cemetery and several abandoned buildings remain at the site of Sheikh Brak.

== See also ==
- Armenians in Haifa

== Bibliography ==
- Kark, Ruth; Oppenheim, Aviv (2017), "Armenian Farmers in Palestine/Israel: The Hamlet of Sheikh Bureik during the Twentieth Century", Cathedra (in Hebrew), 162: 67–94
