= Lucy Thompson =

Yurok author, b. 1853

- Che-na-wah Weitch-ah-wah
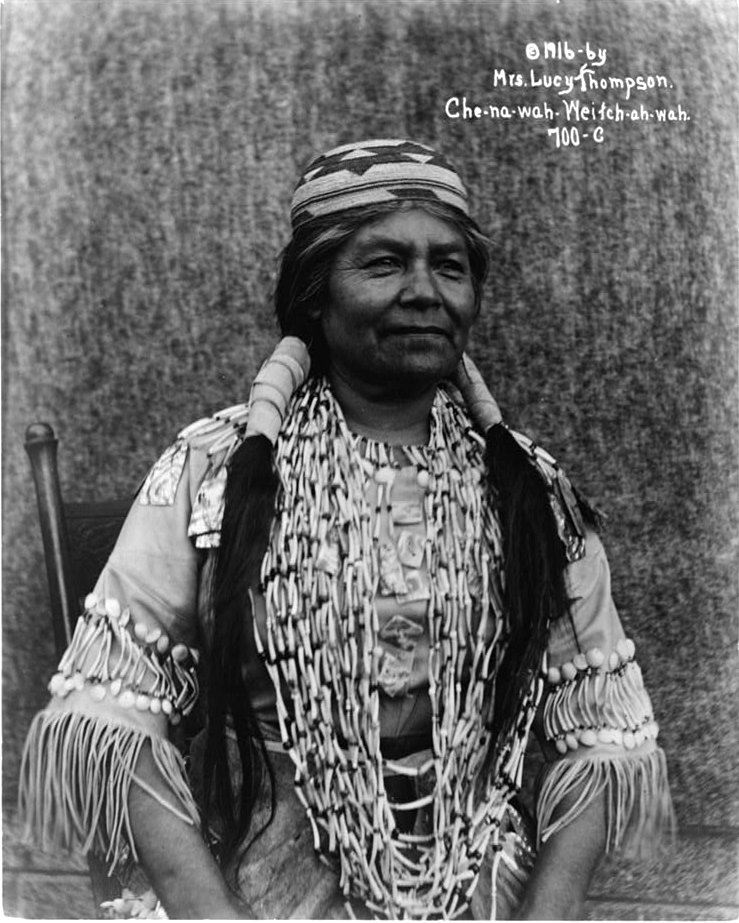
- Thompson in 1916
- Born: Che-Na-Wah Weitch-Ah-Wah; 1856; Pek-won, California
- Died: February 23, 1932 (aged 75–76); Eureka, California
- Known for: Authorship
- Notable work: To the American Indian: Reminiscences of a Yurok Woman

Che-na-wah Weitch-ah-wah (1856-1932), commonly known by her English name Lucy Thompson, was a Yurok author, best known for her book To the American Indian: Reminiscences of a Yurok Woman. Written in 1916, the book is intended to preserve her people's stories. The book received the American Book Award decades later in 1992. Thompson was born in the Klamath River village of Pecwan. Outside the book she is known to have come from "Yurok aristocracy" and to be married to a Euro-American man named Milton "Jim" Thompson. She intended to tell the stories of her people that were not being told by others, and to make others better understand her people and perspective, although she also criticized whites for practices like overfishing. Thompson expressed that violence towards indigenous Californians were deliberate acts of genocide and she expressed concern for the continued stewardship of Klamath River salmon.

== Life ==
Born October 29, 1856 in Pec-Wan Village, Lucy Thompson was a member of the Yurok Tribe, located in Northern California. Her Yurok name was Che-na-wah Weitch-ah-wah. Weitch-ah-wah's was trained as a Talth, or spiritual leader, by her father, who also served the tribe in this capacity. in 1875, she married Jim Thompson, a white timber cruiser who was also an important figure in the local Masonic Lodge. Together they lived along the Klamath River and moved to Eureka in 1910. Lucy died in Eureka, California on February 23, 1932, only a year and two months after her husbands passing.

== Awards ==
Thompson received the American Book Award for her book To the American Indian: Reminiscences of a Yurok Woman.

== Works ==
Lucy Thompson's major work is her nonfiction, biographical book To the American Indian: Reminiscences of a Yurok Woman, originally published in 1916. The book explores Thompson's own life and upbringing, as well as other members of the Yurok tribe, in late nineteenth and early twentieth century California.
