= Orick Peanut =

Coordinates: 41.284839°N 124.073972°W

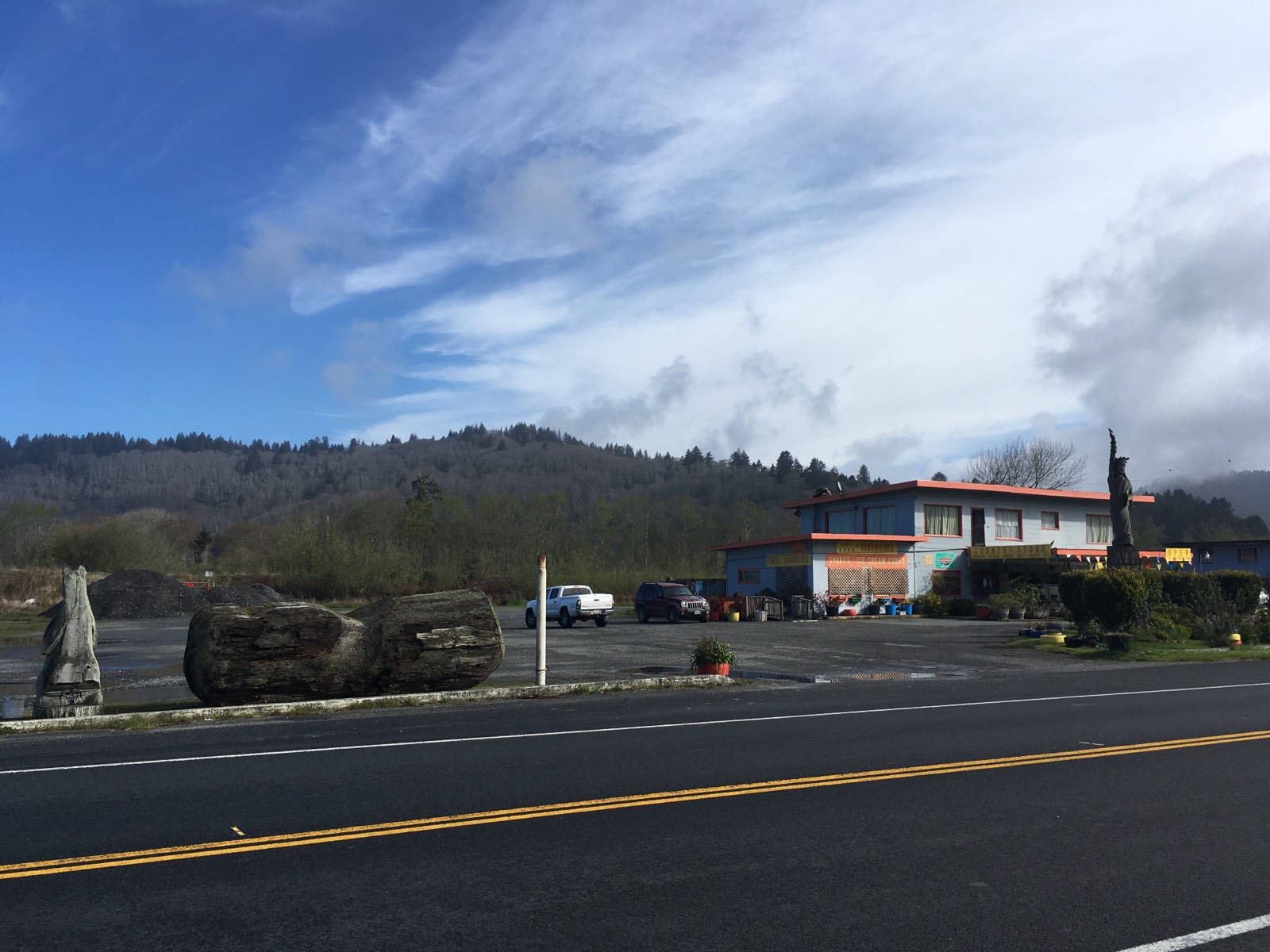
The Orick Peanut, as viewed from Highway 101

The Orick Peanut was a wooden sculpture located in the parking lot of the Shoreline Deli and Market on the south side of the town of Orick located in Humboldt County, California. It was created as part of a protest against the expansion of Redwood National Park (later Redwood National and State Parks) in 1978. It was estimated to weigh 9 tons and was approximately 10 feet long and 6 feet tall. In June 2023 it was struck by a car and irreparably destroyed.

== Creation ==
The Peanut was created by a group of people, including Glen Schirmann, a prominent figure in the local logging community. It was carved with chainsaws from a large piece of old growth redwood. It was estimated to weigh 9 tons.

The peanut shape is related to the fact that Jimmy Carter, the president at the time, was known as a former peanut farmer. The Orick Peanut was made as a mock gift for Jimmy Carter as part of a protest against his proposed expansion of the Redwood National Park, which was seen as an overstepping of federal power, a waste of money, and a move that would negatively impact the Redwood logging industry based communities in Humboldt County, like Orick.

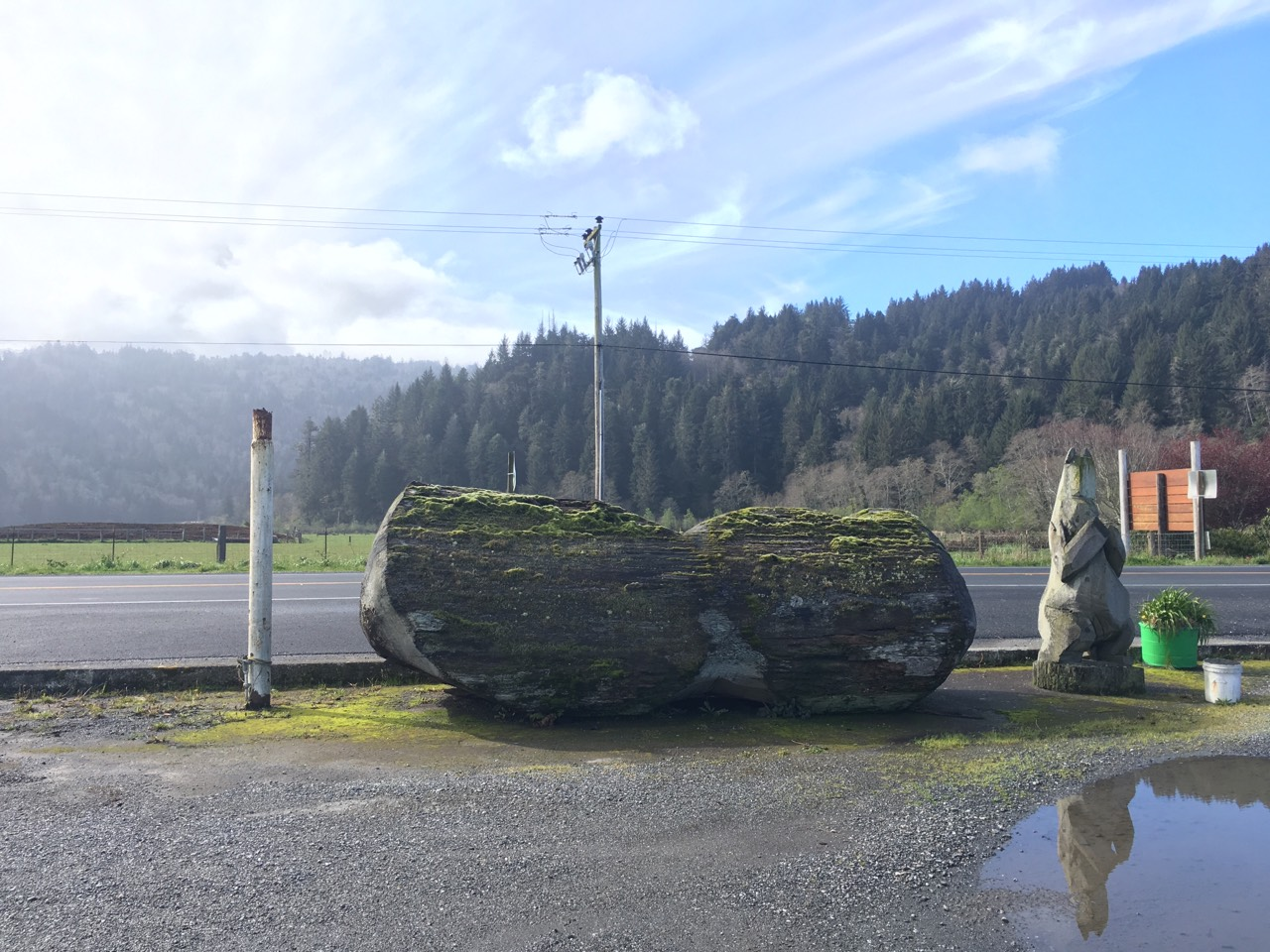
The Orick Peanut

== Travels to Washington D.C. ==
The Orick Peanut, loaded onto a tractor trailer, led a procession of logging trucks from Humboldt County across the United States to Washington DC. The Peanut was presented to President Jimmy Carter as a mock present, along with an attached sign that read "It might be Peanuts to you, But it's Jobs to Us". The President's aides turned the Peanut away, and it was driven back, with the procession, back to Orick, where it remained until a car ran into it in 2023, smashing it into irreparable pieces, which were removed.

== See also ==
"Enough is Enough" Documentary created by the Associated California Loggers, 1977
