= Orick, California =

Orick ʼOʼrekw (Yurok)
- census-designated place
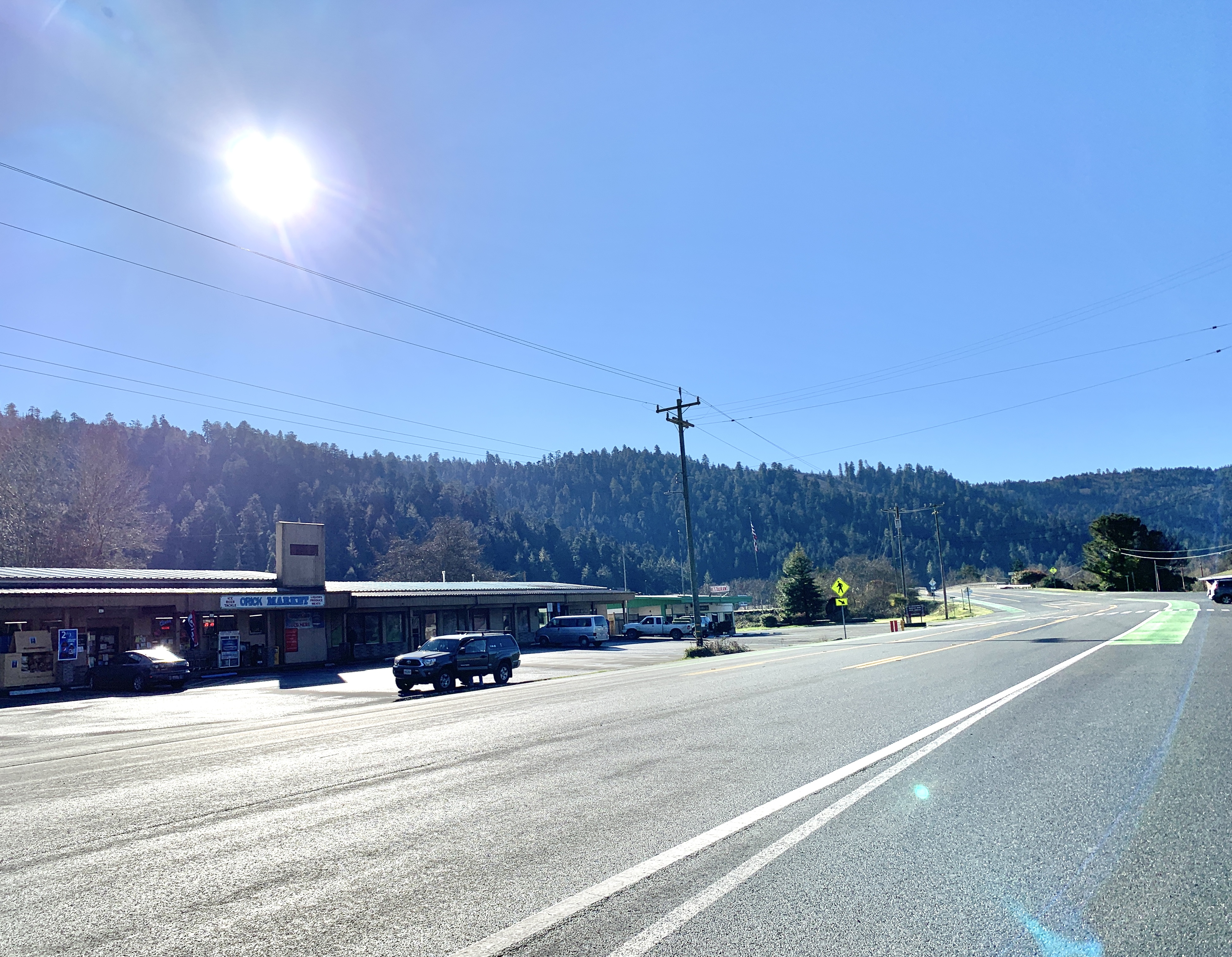

- Location in California
- Coordinates: 41°17′12″N 124°03′35″W
- Country: United States
- State: California
- County: Humboldt

Area
  - Total: 4.850 sq mi (12.561 km^{2})
  - Land: 4.746 sq mi (12.291 km^{2})
  - Water: 0.104 sq mi (0.270 km^{2}) 2.15%
- Elevation: 26 ft (8 m)

Population (2020)
  - Total: 328
  - Density: 69.1/sq mi (26.7/km^{2})
- Time zone: UTC-8 (Pacific (PST))
  - Summer (DST): UTC-7 (PDT)
- ZIP Code: 95555
- Area code: 707
- FIPS code: 06-54218
- GNIS feature IDs: 230092, 2611444

Orick (formerly, Arekw, Orekw, and Oreq, Yurok: ʼOʼrekw) is a census-designated place situated on the banks of the Redwood Creek in Humboldt County, California, United States. It is located 43 miles (69 km) north of Eureka, at an elevation of 26 feet (8 m). The population was 328 at the 2020 census.

Orick's most notable feature is the large herds of elk who call Orick and its surrounding parks their home. These elk can usually be seen from the road while driving through Orick. The elk in Orick appear to be relatively comfortable around people, and many are tagged.

Rare minerals orickite and coyoteite were discovered at Coyote Peak near Orick.

== History ==
ʼOʼrekw means "mouth of the river" in Yurok. Orick evolved from the original word. The Yurok people had 74 known villages in the area, and ʼOʼrekw was one of five where jumping dances were held. At times spelled Or'eQw, there is no "Q" in the living Yurok people's alphabet.

Non-native settlers arrived with the Gold Rush, beginning in 1850 after the Josiah Gregg expedition discovered Humboldt Bay. Orick was settled not only for being on the way to mining claims in the Trinity, but for five beach sand mining claims fronting several miles of beach in the Gold Bluff District. The gold sands did not produce well, and the local gold rush was over by the 1870s.

The first post office at Orick opened in 1887.

The earliest wagons traveled along the beaches, but in 1894 the county – that time covering both the modern Humboldt and Del Norte counties – finished a wagon road between Eureka and Crescent City.

Lumbering removed the trees in and around Orick and dairy farmers utilized the flood plain. Until a bridge was built in 1903, Redwood Creek was always crossed by Swan's Ferry.

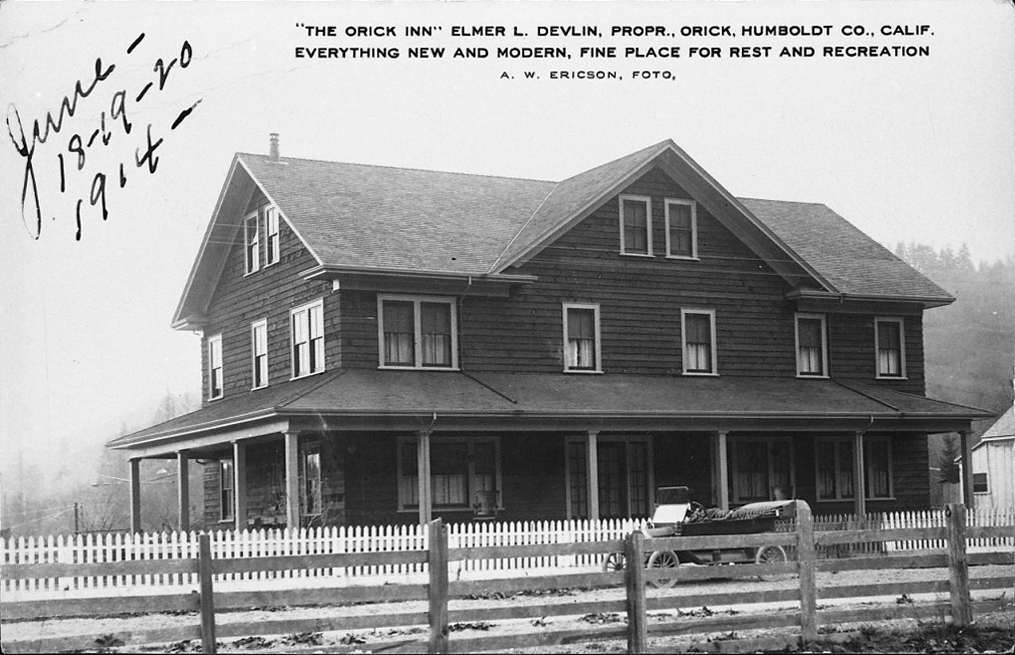
The original Orick Inn

Robert Swan was a local rancher and businessman who owned the ferry and the local store, which was bought out by native Eurekan Elmer L. Devlin (born August 1, 1877) who built the original Orick Inn. Devlin's first building burned down in 1918 and was rebuilt by 1922. It was known for home cooked food, as well as hosting fishermen and notables including opera singer Madame Ernestine Schumann-Heink, actors Fred MacMurray and Ronald Colman and President Herbert Hoover.

In 1924, the Redwood Highway reached Orick and by the 1930s connected from San Francisco, California to Oregon. Tourists arrived to see the giant redwoods.

After World War II, Orick became a lumber and timber mill town in response to the post-war demand for timber. The business boomed for about fifteen years until closed by the consolidation of mills in larger towns and foundation of the Redwood National Park.

=== Elephant Historical Plaque ===
On October 1, 1927, a circus elephant named "Big Diamond" collapsed five miles north of Orick after freeing ten "Honest Bill Animal Show" trucks mired in the new highway construction. Honest Bill told a highway contractor that the elephant's skin was valuable and that the contractor could keep the money if he would remove the remains. The contractor skinned and buried the elephant, but the skin turned out to be useless. Many years later, the elephants bones were unearthed, and originally misidentified as a mammoth, but newspaper morgues found and repeated the story of Big Diamond's demise. A memorial plaque was placed near where the bones were found in May 1993 by E Clampus Vitus Eureka Chapter 101.

== Geography ==
Orick is part of the California Coast Range, lying close to the Pacific Ocean along U.S. 101. It is bisected by Redwood Creek and is approximately 15 miles (24 km) south of the current northern border of Humboldt County and an equal distance north of the town of Trinidad.

The Orick/Gold Bluff Beach district runs about 10 miles (16 km) along the beach at Orick. Placer mining started in 1852 and continued until the 1880s during which time the district yielded more than $10 million value. Gold here is found in black sands at the beach and east of the beaches; its source may be sorted from materials brought down the Klamath River which arrives in the Pacific twenty miles north of Orick.

=== Redwood Creek Flood Control Project – Humboldt County ===
Floods in 1950, 1953, 1955 and 1964 resulted in channel enlargement, excavation and the construction of earthen levees along each side of the lower 3.4 miles (5.5 km) Redwood Creek (Humboldt County) by the U.S. Army Corps of Engineers during 1966 to 1968 to protect the community of Orick. An error was made within the construction. Fault was admitted shortly after the completion. Observation shows this design flaw invades the Redwood Creek estuary. This unwarranted annexation causes extreme damage to the ecosystem. The estuary sits at the western end of the flawed levee system known as the Redwood Creek Flood Control Project – Humboldt County (RCFCP – Humboldt County).The system is maintained by Humboldt County which determined that a general investigation is needed by USACE to consider reworking the system to a more natural condition while retaining flood control benefits.

== Climate ==
This region experiences warm (but not hot) and dry summers, with no average monthly temperatures above 71.6 °F. According to the Köppen Climate Classification system, Orick has a warm-summer Mediterranean climate, abbreviated "Csb" on climate maps. Being situated a couple of miles inland surrounded by hills, Orick has somewhat milder summer days than expected for areas on the North Coast with on average 0.7 days above 32 °C (90 °F) and average September highs of 21 °C (70 °F). Although never more severe than −8 °C (18 °F); there are, on average, 38 air frosts per season. There is on average 67.3 inches (1,710 mm) of precipitation in a year, making it a very wet mediterranean climate.

Climate data for Orick
Month	Jan	Feb	Mar	Apr	May	Jun	Jul	Aug	Sep	Oct	Nov	Dec	Year
Record high °F (°C)	71 (22)	77 (25)	80 (27)	88 (31)	93 (34)	99 (37)	96 (36)	97 (36)	99 (37)	90 (32)	75 (24)	68 (20)	99 (37)
Mean daily maximum °F (°C)	52.2 (11.2)	55.2 (12.9)	57.0 (13.9)	59.5 (15.3)	62.8 (17.1)	65.8 (18.8)	68.7 (20.4)	69.6 (20.9)	70.7 (21.5)	65.7 (18.7)	57.0 (13.9)	52.0 (11.1)	61.4 (16.3)
Daily mean °F (°C)	44.4 (6.9)	46.6 (8.1)	47.7 (8.7)	49.6 (9.8)	52.9 (11.6)	56.1 (13.4)	58.6 (14.8)	59.4 (15.2)	58.5 (14.7)	54.3 (12.4)	48.7 (9.3)	44.8 (7.1)	51.8 (11.0)
Mean daily minimum °F (°C)	36.9 (2.7)	37.9 (3.3)	38.1 (3.4)	39.7 (4.3)	43 (6)	46 (8)	48.7 (9.3)	48.9 (9.4)	46.2 (7.9)	43.2 (6.2)	40.5 (4.7)	37.6 (3.1)	42.2 (5.7)
Record low °F (°C)	19 (−7)	21 (−6)	25 (−4)	17 (−8)	27 (−3)	31 (−1)	31 (−1)	31 (−1)	31 (−1)	25 (−4)	23 (−5)	17 (−8)	17 (−8)
Average precipitation inches (mm)	10.8 (275)	9.4 (240)	9.0 (229)	5.0 (126)	3.3 (84)	1.4 (35)	0.3 (8)	0.5 (13)	1.3 (32)	4.7 (119)	9.5 (242)	12.0 (306)	67.2 (1,709)
Average precipitation days	16	15	16	12	9	5	2	3	5	9	15	17	124

== Demographics ==
Historical population
Census	Pop.	Note	%±
2010	357		—
2020	328		−8.1%
2021 (est.)	300	▼	−8.5%
U.S. Decennial Census; 1860–1870 1880-1890; 1900 1910 1920; 1930 1940 1950; 1960 1970 1980; 1990 2000 2010

Orick first appeared as a census designated place in the 2010 U.S. census.

Race and Ethnicity
Racial and ethnic composition	2010	2020
White (non-Hispanic)	77.03%	69.21%
Two or more races (non-Hispanic)	5.6%	12.2%
Hispanic or Latino (of any race)	5.6%	9.15%
Native American (non-Hispanic)	10.36%	4.88%
Other (non-Hispanic)	0.56%	1.83%
Black or African American (non-Hispanic)	0.0%	0.91%
Asian (non-Hispanic)	0.0%	0.91%
Pacific Islander (non-Hispanic)	0.84%	0.91%

The 2020 United States census reported that Orick had a population of 328. The population density was 69.1 inhabitants per square mile (26.7/km^{2}). The racial makeup of Orick was 234 (71.3%) White, 3 (0.9%) African American, 17 (5.2%) Native American, 3 (0.9%) Asian, 3 (0.9%) Pacific Islander, 16 (4.9%) from other races, and 52 (15.9%) from two or more races. Hispanic or Latino of any race were 30 persons (9.1%).

The whole population lived in households. There were 147 households, out of which 22 (15.0%) had children under the age of 18 living in them, 43 (29.3%) were married-couple households, 27 (18.4%) were cohabiting couple households, 34 (23.1%) had a female householder with no partner present, and 43 (29.3%) had a male householder with no partner present. 53 households (36.1%) were one person, and 14 (9.5%) were one person aged 65 or older. The average household size was 2.23. There were 70 families (47.6% of all households).

The age distribution was 44 people (13.4%) under the age of 18, 17 people (5.2%) aged 18 to 24, 87 people (26.5%) aged 25 to 44, 104 people (31.7%) aged 45 to 64, and 76 people (23.2%) who were 65 years of age or older. The median age was 49.3 years. For every 100 females, there were 92.9 males.

There were 181 housing units at an average density of 38.1 units per square mile (14.7 units/km^{2}), of which 147 (81.2%) were occupied. Of these, 64 (43.5%) were owner-occupied, and 83 (56.5%) were occupied by renters.

== Economy ==
Orick is surrounded by state and national parks and is on several trail networks in the Redwood National and State Parks, as well as the Redwood Creek Estuary Trail, the Humboldt Lagoons trails, the California Coastal Trail, and the Pacific Coast Bicycle Route.

Tourists visit in both the dry and the wet seasons with attendance averaging 35,000 a month (low of 13,631 February, high of 70,215 August) in 2010. About 20 percent seek local lodging by camping or lodging in the parks.

== Parks and recreation ==
Redwood National Park Thomas H. Kuchel Visitor Center is located on US Highway 101 just before reaching Orick, California. The Redwood National Park Southern Operation Center (SOC) is located directly in town on US Highway 101 across the road from the local market and US Post Office.

== Government ==
In the state legislature, Orick is in the 2nd senatorial district, represented by Democrat Mike McGuire, and the 2nd Assembly district, represented by Democrat Chris Rogers.

Federally, it is in California's 2nd congressional district, represented by Democrat Jared Huffman.

== Education ==
Orick is served by the Orick Elementary School with grades K-8, but faces closure regularly due to low enrollment.

== Infrastructure ==
Orick is served by U.S. Highway 101 and smaller county roads.

Fire service began in 1955 and water service in 1976; both are maintained by the Orick Community Services District over about 2.3 square miles (6.0 km^{2}) Fire and emergency medical service covers an area of 123.8 miles (199.2 km). Water is provided to the Redwood National Park Visitors’ Center by the district. Orick Community Hall is maintained by the district.

== In popular culture ==
The community was featured in the PlayStation 3 video game Resistance 2.

The town is briefly seen in the 2018 film Jurassic World: Fallen Kingdom, a few miles away from the Lockwood Estate where the auction of the last dinosaurs takes place.

== See also ==
- Prairie Creek Redwoods State Park
- Orick Peanut
