= Coyoteite =

Mineral

General
- Category: Sulfide mineral
- Formula: (NaFe_{3}S_{5}·2H_{2}O)
- IMA symbol: Coy
- Strunz classification: 2.FD.25
- Dana classification: 02.14.06.01
- Crystal system: Triclinic; Unknown space group

Identification
- Color: black
- Crystal habit: Irregular grains - occurs as splotchy, anhedral crystals forming inclusions in other minerals
- Cleavage: {111} Perfect
- Mohs scale hardness: 1-1.5
- Luster: Metallic
- Streak: black
- Diaphaneity: Opaque
- Specific gravity: 2.5–2.62 measured; 2.879 calculated
- Pleochroism: Faint, from gray to pink
- Other characteristics: Moderately magnetic

Coyoteite is a hydrated sodium iron sulfide mineral. The mineral was named coyoteite after Coyote Peak near Orick, California, where it was discovered (along with another rare mineral, orickite).

This mineral is unstable under normal atmospheric conditions, making it rare at the surface. The mineral was first described in a petrographic study of a sample of a mafic diatreme at Coyote Peak. The largest piece of coyoteite found on that specimen has the dimensions of 0.2 mm × 0.4 mm (0.0079 in × 0.0157 in).

== Chemical composition and properties ==
The chemical formula of the mineral is NaFe_{3}S_{5}·2H_{2}O. It was obtained by the analysis of five grains using the 10-kV EMX-SM electron microprobe. The total concentration of detected elements was less than 100% (90.7 weight percent). Qualitative analyses and TAP crystal were used to find the missing 9.31%. The results confirmed the missing elements to be hydrogen and oxygen, which are undetectable by the electron microprobe. It was unclear however whether the hydrogen and oxygen are in the form of water or a hydroxide.

The mineral is insoluble in cold acids, such as HCl, but dissolves upon heating.

== Physical and optical properties ==
Coyoteite is black in color and is streaked with opaque metallic luster in fragmental samples. The mineral has perfect cleavage on the {111} planes and shows a unique chevron pattern because of the diametrical arrangement of these crystallographically equivalent cleavage planes. The measured density is 2.5 to 2.6 g/cm^{3} and the calculated one is 2.879 g/cm^{3}. This significant density difference is because of the presence of epoxy between the cleavage planes. The hardness is 1.5 on Mohs scale and is comparable to that of erdite (NaFeS_{2}·2H_{2}O) which has a similar chemical composition. Coyoteite is moderately magnetic. On the polished thin section, coyoteite is pale brownish to gray, with pink tint. It shows low pleochroism, from gray to pink. In reverse, it shows large optical anisotropy, from gray to dull golden orange.

== Crystallography ==
The X-ray precession image classifies the coyoteite crystal system as triclinic. The crystal belongs to P1 or P1̅ space group and to 1 or 1̅ point group. Imaging shows that coyoteite has poor crystal quality. The X-ray diffraction pattern suggests the following value for the crystallographic axes a = 7.409 Å, b = 9.881 Å, c = 6.441 Å; α = 100° 25’, β = 104° 37’ and γ = 81° 29’; the unit cell volume is V = 446.2 Å^{3}.

== Possible atomic structure ==
Scarcity of coyoteite hinders attempts to determine its atomic structure. It is unknown whether the oxygen and the hydrogen are present in the mineral as H_{2}O molecules or OH^{−} anions. However, because of the softness and the lamellar cleavage in the mineral, coyoteite structure might be close to that of valleriite, 4(Fe,Cu)S•3(Mg,Al)(OH)_{2}. Valleriite is a layered mineral, it consists of layers of (Mg_{0.68}Al_{0.32}(OH)_{2}) and layers of (Fe_{0.07}Cu_{0.93}S_{2}).

== Geologic occurrence ==
Coyoteite has been found only in the mafic alkalic diatreme at the Coyote Peak near Orick, Humboldt County, California, US. It is formed in pegmatitic clots associated with some rare iron sulfide minerals, such as erdite, bartonite and djerfisherite, as well as with common minerals pyrrhotite and magnetite.
