= Shahe Ajamian =

Shahe Ajamian (Armenian: Շահե Աճեմյան; 24 July 1926, Aleppo – 13 July 2005, Yerevan) was an archbishop of the Armenian Apostolic Church who managed the finances of the church in Jerusalem. Considered pro-Israeli, he maintained good relations with Mayor Teddy Kollek and sold land in the city to the Israeli government. In 1986, he was caught in a smuggling and bribery scandal along with Interior Ministry official Raphael Levy.
