= Atlit =

Atlit or Athlit may refer to:

== Places ==
- Atlit, an historical fortified town in Israel, also known as Château Pèlerin
- Atlit (modern town), a nearby town in Israel

== Transportation ==
- Atlit railway station, an Israel Railways passenger station serving the modern town of Atlit

== Media ==
- Athlit (album), an ambient music album by Oöphoi
- Atlit (film), a 2014 Franco-Israeli film

== Military ==
- Atlit naval base
- Atlit detainee camp
