= Ore'q, California =

Ore'q ʼOʼrekw (Yurok)
- Former settlement
- Location in California
- Coordinates: 41°17′09″N 124°03′39″W
- Country: United States
- State: California
- County: Humboldt
- Elevation: 30 ft (9 m)

Ore'q (Yurok: ʼOʼrekw; also Arekw or Oruk) is a former Yurok settlement in Humboldt County, California, United States. It lay at an elevation of 30 feet (9 m). The town of Orick keeps the name alive in nearly the same place today.

Other sources suggest the town was instead located 2 miles (3.2 km) southwest of Orick; its precise location is known but not disclosed to the general public.
