= Garabed Krikorian =

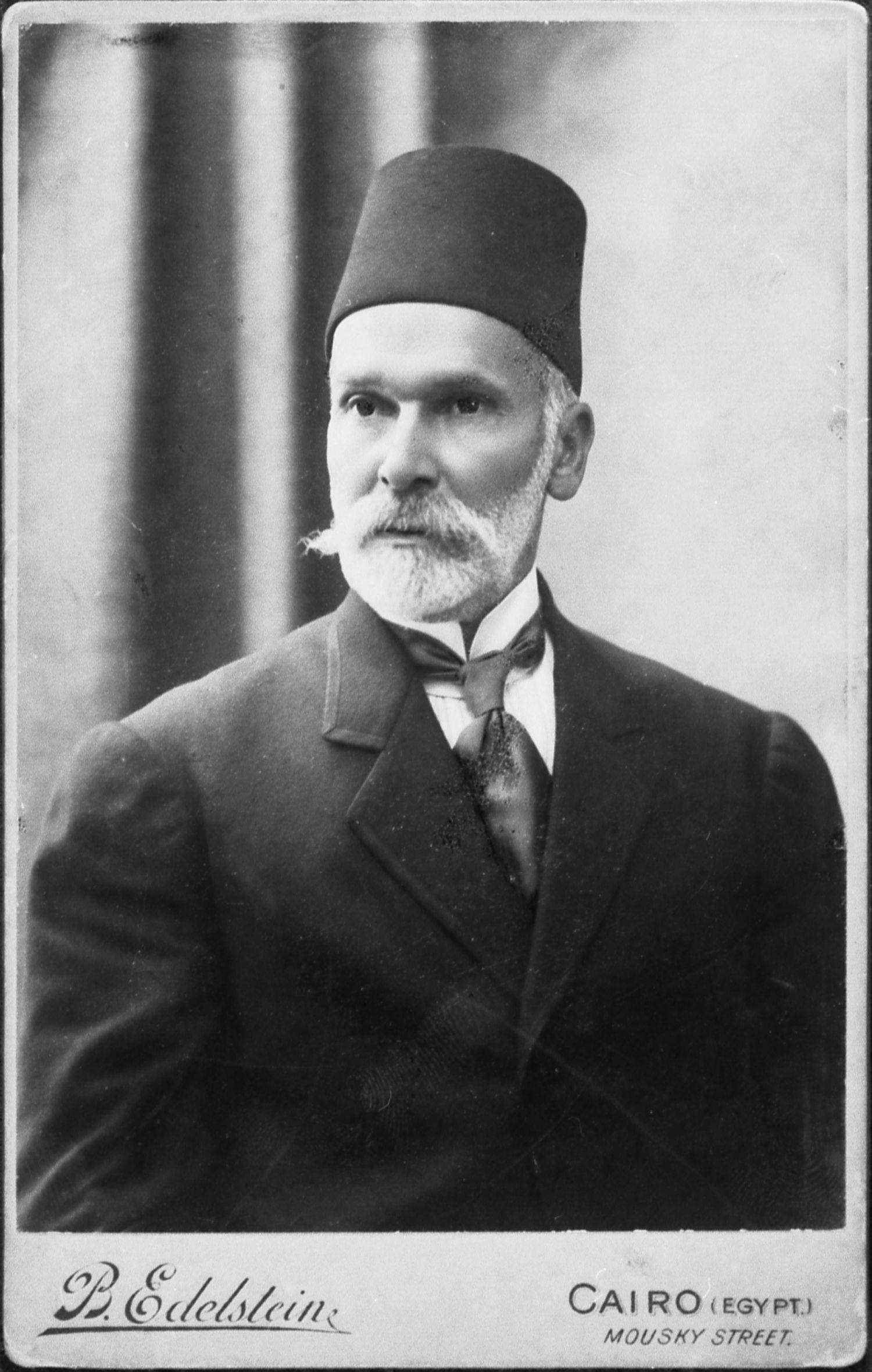
Garabed Krikorian by B. Edelstein

Garabed Krikorian (Armenian: Կարապետ Գրիգորեան and Arabic: جارابيد كريكوريان 1847 – December 1920) was an Armenian photographer known for his pioneering work in photography in Jerusalem during the late 19th and early 20th centuries. He is regarded as one of the earliest and famous professional photographers in the region and played a significant role in documenting the people, landscapes, and historic sites of Palestine during the Ottoman and British Mandate periods.

== Background ==
Garabed Krikorian was born in Smyrna (modern-day İzmir, Turkey) into an Armenian family. In 1859, at the age of twelve, he moved to Jerusalem to pursue his education at a local school. Based at the Armenian Church of Saint James, he was introduced to photography through the school workshops established in 1860 by Isaiah Garabedian, who later became the Armenian Patriarch of Jerusalem. His brother Kevork was also educated by Garabedian. At church, Krikorian met his wife Karimah Tannous; they were excommunicated after marrying.

Garabedian, who initially served as a photographer for the Armenian Patriarchate, later founded his own photography studio. Following his election as Patriarch, the studio's operations were continued by his students, including Garabed Krikorian. The studio remained active under Garabedian's supervision until 1882 and was permanently closed in 1885.

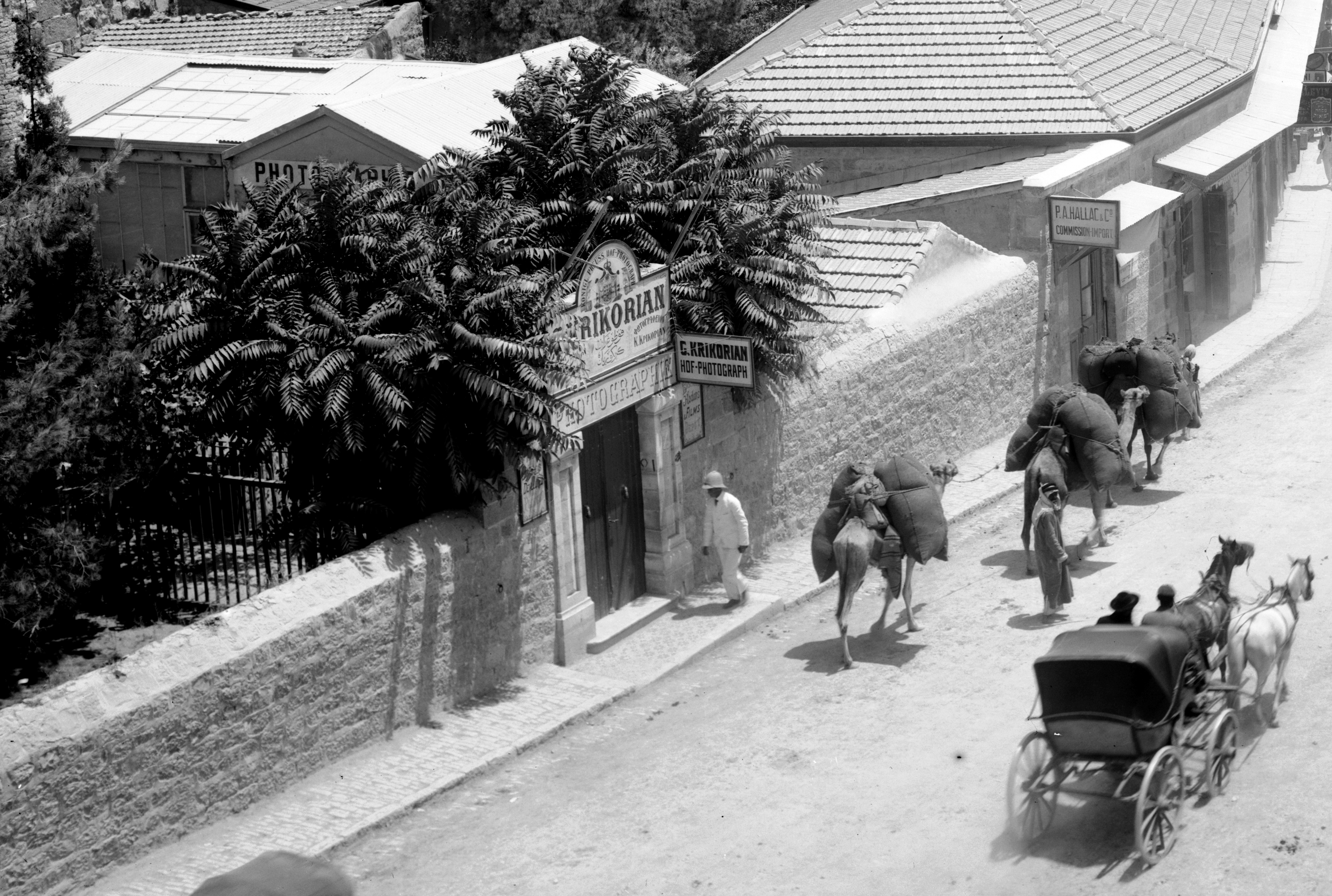
Krikorian's studio on Jaffa Street

In 1885, Krikorian established Jerusalem's first photographic studio, located on Jaffa Street in the historic center of the city. He collaborated with several colleagues, including Daoud Sabonji and Mitri, and later worked alongside his son Johannes Grigoryan (1885–1950).

Krikorian specialised in portrait photography, particularly in the Eastern style, which was popular among both locals and visitors. His clientele included Jewish, Arab, and European residents of Jerusalem, as well as tourists attracted to the distinctive aesthetic of his work.

== Death and legacy ==
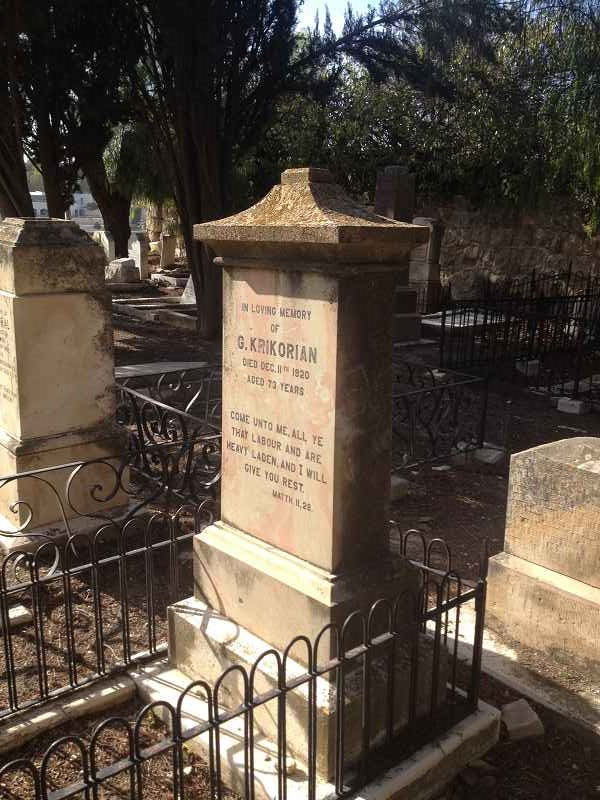
Krikorian's gravesite, Jerusalem

After his death at the end of 1912, Krikorian's son Johannes took over the photography studio.

== See also ==
- Armenians in Israel and Palestine
