= Pekwan, California =

Pekwan Pekwon (Yurok) Pecwan
- Former settlement
- Location in California
- Coordinates: 41°20′34″N 123°51′09″W
- Country: United States
- State: California
- County: Humboldt County
- Elevation: 85 ft (26 m)

Pekwan (Note: also Pecwan, Pack-wans, Pak-wan, Pank-wans, Pec-quan, Pek-wan, and Tirip'ama) (Yurok: Pekwon) is a locality and former Yurok settlement in Humboldt County, California. It is located at an elevation of 85 feet (26 m). on the Lower Klamath River at the mouth of Pecwan Creek, 1 mile (1.6 km) east-southeast of Johnsons.

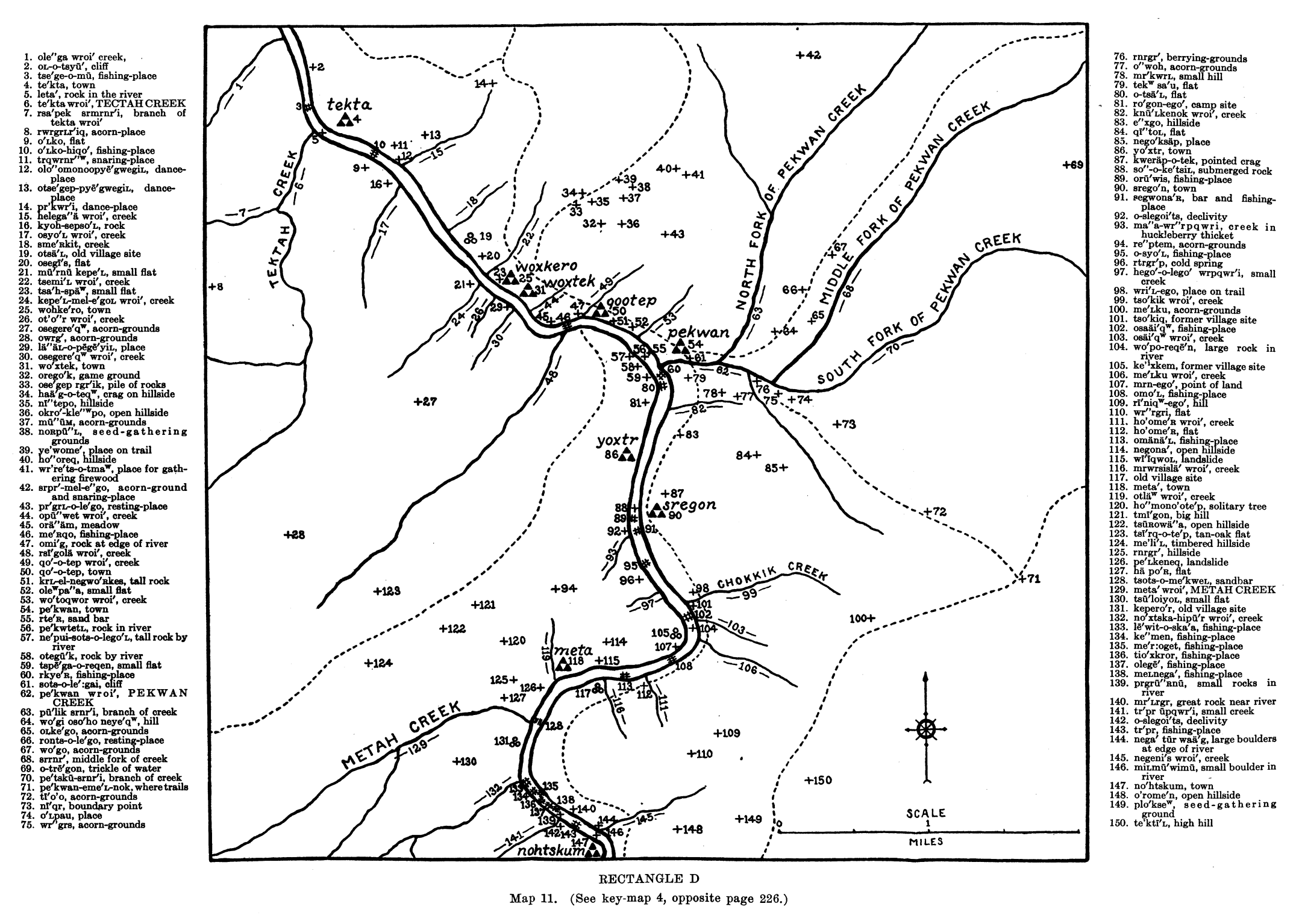
Remains of Pekwan in 1920
