= Peter E. Palmquist =

American photography historian (1936–2003)

- Born: September 23, 1936; Oakland, California, U.S.
- Died: January 13, 2003 (aged 66); Oakland, California, U.S.
- Occupations: Photographer, photography historian
- Known for: History of photography in the American West and women photographers
- Children: 3 daughters

Peter Eric Palmquist (September 23, 1936 – January 13, 2003) was an autodidact photography historian and independent researcher/writer before the 1950.

== Biography ==
Palmquist was born into the working-class family of Carl Eric Palmquist and Blanche Lucille Palmquist in Oakland and lived as an adult in the logging community of Arcata, near the Oregon border. As a twelve-year-old, he taught himself photography. He began his career as an Army photographer during his military service stationed in Paris, where he worked for the Supreme Headquarters Allied Powers Europe (SHAPE) for which he photographed many heads of state. In addition he made portraits of many famous stage and screen actors. During his military service in Europe, Palmquist married Sally Forward, then returned to California in 1959, when his enlistment ended. Palmquist worked briefly as a photographer for the state government of California from 1959 to 1961, then took a job as the staff photographer for Humboldt State University and enrolled for undergraduate study. He graduated in 1965 with a B.A. in Art, but took no formal education in photography history.

== Researcher ==
He became interested in historic photographs in 1971 when he was given a set of old photographs of California by an antique store owner in McKinleyville, then continued to collect photographs, concentrating on the American West and California, with a special interest in Humboldt County, where he lived most of his life, and professional women photographers. Before long he started to write books and articles about his finds.

In 1983 Palmquist published his own book Carleton E. Watkins: Photographer of the American West accompanied by an exhibition that traveled to museums in Fort Worth, St. Louis and Boston. The show, with its inclusion of images of gardens, cityscapes and Spanish mission churches, prompted a reassessment of Watkins as more than a landscape photographer, and demonstrated Palmquist's capabilities as a researcher. His methodology was unusual in commencing from the photographic imagery rather than the written document, a practice compatible with his preference for obscure photographers he could afford to collect.

"Part of the collecting incentive was that photographs were generally cheap. A fine daguerreotype went for less than ten dollars, and many could be had for under three. Portrait photographs were seldom sold for more than fifty cents, and it was not uncommon to see large numbers of them as cheap as ten cents apiece. Tintypes were commonly fifty cents, while the lavish, Victorian-era, family albums were usually less than fifteen dollars. Outdoor photographs, especially town scenes, were another matter. These, along with stereographs, had already begun to interest local collectors. Nonetheless, it was unusual for a fine town view to fetch more than ten dollars, while twin-imaged stereographs rarely surpassed one dollar apiece. That is not to say that these artifacts were 'dirt' cheap during the 1970s, but they were most certainly a bargain by today's standards. It also helped that I was apparently the only person in Humboldt County that seriously collected old photographs."

This approach is enshrined in his Women in Photography Archive of more than 18,000 biographical files on female photographers; 2,000 books and 4,000 articles by and about women photographers; and approximately 8,300 vintage photographs many of them produced during the 19th century and taken by women. Many of them had their own photographic studios around the turn of the 20th century, and were previously unknown and unresearched, like Elizabeth Fleischmann, the first x-ray photographer in California who lost her life to radiation poisoning.

== Contributions ==
He participated in more than one hundred exhibitions of historical photography. initially, his lack of confidence in his own abilities as a writer caused him to enlist other authors for his first four books; Humboldt State University graduate student David Smith, and journalist Alann Steen, editor of Pacifica: Magazine of the Northcoast

"...acquainted with A. W. Ericson's photographs I decided that it was time to write a book, Fine California Views: The Photographs of A. W. Ericson (1975), that was my first attempt at narrative writing. Although the book was well received, my naïveté and lack of writing prowess was painfully evident."

Eventually his own texts were to include more than 40 books and 320 articles, many on women photographers, and he compiled the bibliography for Naomi Rosenblum's important 1994 A History of Women Photographers. He was the founding editor of The Daguerreian Annual; past president of the National Stereoscopic Association; and founder and curator of the Women in Photography International Archive. He served as a consultant and researcher on such projects as Ken Burns' television documentary, The West.

== Later life and untimely death ==
Palmquist remained on staff at the Humboldt University until retiring after 28 years in 1989. He supplemented his income by photographing weddings, more than 750 in all, most of them in Humboldt County.

Palmquist died on January 13, 2003, at Alameda County Medical Center Highland Hospital after three days in a coma after being struck by a hit-and-run driver while walking his dog in Emeryville, California. He was engaged to marry Pam Mendelsohn, his partner of 26 years, in April 2003. His step-daughter, Rebekah Burgess, followed in his footsteps and earned a PhD in Photo History. He had married Sally Forward of London, England, in 1957 while overseas and they had three daughters before their divorce. He was also survived by two brothers, John Frederic Palmquist and Carl Edward Palmquist.

== Legacy ==
The Peter E. Palmquist Memorial Fund for Historical Photographic Research was founded by his partner Pam Mendelsohn. In 2005 the Fund commenced in providing financial support to independent researchers who are studying either photographers of the American West before 1900, or women photographers past and present.

Palmquist's archive of more than 150,000 photographs and research documents is housed at the Beinecke Rare Book and Manuscript Library, Yale University, in New Haven, Connecticut where it forms a cornerstone of its Western Americana Collection.

== Bibliography ==
=== Books and catalogs ===
Palmquist, Peter E & Kailbourn, Thomas R. Pioneer photographers from the Mississippi to the continental divide : a biographical dictionary, 1839-1865. Stanford University Press, Stanford, Calif. 2005.

Palmquist, Peter E & Society of California Pioneers & Lawrence & Houseworth. Points of interest : California views, 1860-1870 : the Lawrence & Houseworth albums. Berkeley Hills Books; San Francisco : Society of California Pioneers, [Berkeley, CA]. 2002.

Johnson, Drew Heath & Oakland Museum of California, with essays by Palmquist, Peter E. Capturing light : masterpieces of California photography, 1850 to the present. Oakland Museum of California; New York; London : W.W.Norton, Oakland. 2001.

Palmquist, Peter E & Kailbourn, Thomas R. Pioneer photographers of the far west : a biographical dictionary, 1840-1865. Stanford University Press; [Cambridge : Cambridge University Press] [distributor], Stanford, California. 2000.

Palmquist, Peter E & Haynes, David & Rudisill, Richard Photographers : a sourcebook for historical research (Rev. 2nd ed). Carl Mautz Pub, Nevada City, CA, 2000

Dassonville, William E & Herzig, Susan, (editor.) & Hertzmann, Paul, (editor.) & Palmquist, Peter E, (author.) & Mills College. Art Museum (organizing body.) Dassonville : William E. Dassonville, California photographer, 1879-1957. Carl Mautz, Nevada City, California. 1999.

Palmquist, Peter E., and Gia Musso. Women Photographers: A Selection of Images from the Women in Photography International Archive 1850-1997. Kneeland, California: Iaqua Press, 1997.

Kibbey, Mead B & Palmquist, Peter E (1996). The railroad photographs of Alfred A. Hart, artist. California State Library Foundation, Sacramento, California. 1996

Palmquist, Peter E.. Camera Fiends & Kodak Girls II: 60 Selections By and About Women in Photography, 1855–1965. New York: Midmarch Arts Press, 1995.

Palmquist, Peter E. (compiler). A Bibliography of Writings by and about Women in Photography 1850-1990 (Second edition). Arcata, California: Published by the author, 1994.

Palmquist, Peter E.. Catharine Weed Barnes Ward: Pioneer Advocate for Women in Photography. Arcata, California: Published by the author, 1992.

Palmquist, Peter E.. Shadowcatchers: A Directory of Women ln California Photography 1900-1920. Arcata, California: Published by the author, 1991 .

Palmquist, Peter E. (compiler). A Bibliography of Writings by and about Women In Photography 1850-1950. Arcata, California: Published by the author, 1990.

Palmquist, Peter E.. Elizabeth Fleischmann: Pioneer X-Ray Photographer (exhibition catalogue). Berkeley, California: Judah L. Magnes Museum, 1990 .

Palmquist, Peter E.. Shadowcatchers: A Directory of Women In California Photography Before 1901. Arcata, California: Published by the author, 1990.

Palmquist, Peter E. (editor). Camera Fiends & Kodak Girls: Writings by and About Women Photographers 1840-1930. New York: Midmarch Arts Press, 1989.

Palmquist, Peter E.. Louise E. Halsey: An American Pictorialist (exhibition catalogue). Arcata, California: Humboldt State University, 1985.

Palmquist, Peter E., Lawrence & Houseworth / Thomas Houseworth & Co.: A Unique View of the West 1860-1886. Columbus: National Stereoscopic Association, 1980.

Palmquist, Peter E.. With Nature's Children: Emma B. Freeman (1880-1928), Camera And Brush. Eureka, California: Interface California Corporation, 1977.

=== Articles, papers, and vignettes ===
Palmquist, Peter E.. "[Laura Adams Armer] Waterless Mountain," in, Perpetual Mirage: Photographic Narratives of the Desert West. (New York: Whitney Museum of American Art, 1996), pp. 118–123.

Palmquist, Peter E.. "[Bibliography]," in Naomi Rosenblum, A History of Women Photographers. (New York: Abbeville, 1994), pp. 328–347."

Palmquist, Peter E.. "Resources for Second World War Women Photographers," History of Photography, vol. 18, no. 3 (Autumn 1994), pp. 247– 255.

Palmquist, Peter E.. "Women Photographers and the American Indian," in An Idaho Photographer ln Focus. (Pocatello, Idaho: Idaho State University, 1993), pp. 121–149.

Palmquist, Peter E.. "She Saved Soldier's Lives, Lost Her Own [Elizabeth Fleischmann]," Women's Heritage Museum [Newsletter], (May 29, 1993), p. 1.

Palmquist, Peter E. "Books by and About Women Photographers," AB Bookman's Weekly (March 1, 1993), pp. 845–856.

Palmquist, Peter E.. "Pioneer Women Photographers in Nineteenth-Century California," California History (Spring 1992), pp. 111–127+.

Palmquist, Peter E.. "Abbie E. Cardozo: Making it in a Man's World," The Humboldt Historian, vol. 39, no. 6 (November/December 1991), pp. 24–25.

Palmquist, Peter E.. "Women Photographers in Nineteenth-Century California (USA) - An Overview," Photoresearcher (European Society for the History of Photography), June 1991, pp. 12–20.

Palmquist, Peter E.. "A Gallery of California's Lady Shadowcatchers," The Californians (November/December 1990), pp. 52–57.

Palmquist, Peter E.. "Elizabeth Fleischmann-Aschheim, Pioneer X-Ray Photographer," Western States Jewish History (October 1990), pp. 35–45.

Palmquist, Peter E.. [Vignettes of daguerreians:] "...Mrs. Julia Ann Rudolph, Mrs. Julia Shannon...," The Daguerreian Annual 1990 (Eureka, California: The Daguerreian Society, 1990), pp. 187–199.

Palmquist, Peter E.. "Miss L. M. Ayers: A Photographer Out of the Ordinary", The Humboldt Historian (May–June 1990), pp. 16–17.

Palmquist, Peter E.. "Women in Photography: Selected Readings [a checklist]," Photography in the West #2 (Manhattan, Kansas: Sunflower University Press, 1989), pp. 127–132.

Palmquist, Peter E.. "Women in Photography: Selected Readings," Journal of the West (January 1989), pp. 127–132.

Palmquist, Peter E.. "19th Century California [Women] Photographers," in Yesterday and Tomorrow: California Women Artists (New York: Midmarch Arts Press, 1989), pp. 282–293.

Palmquist, Peter E.. "The Indomitable Abbie Cardozo," Photography In the West #1 (Manhattan, Kansas: Sunflower University Press, 1987), pp. 106–109.

Palmquist, Peter E.. "'Uncle Frank' Learned Photography at an Early Age [Includes Mary Spesert]," The Humboldt Historian (November/December 1985), pp. 17–19.

Palmquist, Peter E.. "The [Ruth] Roberts Collection of California Indian Photographs: A Brief Review," Journal of California and Great Basin Anthropology (vol. 5, nos 1 & 2, 1983 [in print as of June 1985]), pp. 3–32.

Palmquist, Peter E.. "Portraits and Insights from Two Skilled Image Makers - Abbie Cardozo and Elmo Seely," The Humboldt Historian, (May/June 1984), pp. 6–8+.

Palmquist, Peter E.. "Stereo Artist Mrs. E. W. Withington; or, 'How I use My Skirt for a Darktent,'" Stereo World, vol. 10, no. 5 (November/December 1983), pp. 20–21+.

Palmquist, Peter E.. "Photographers in Petticoats," Journal of the West, vol. 21, no. 2, April 1982.

Palmquist, Peter E.. "California Nineteenth Century Women Photographers," The Photographic Collector, vol. 1, no. 3, Fall 1980.

=== Exhibitions ===
From Aaron to Withington: Selections from Peter Palmquist’s Collection of Women Photographers. Yale University's Beinecke Rare Book & Manuscript Library. April 2010–June 26, 2010

Guest curator. "Shadowcatchers: California Women Photographers, 1850-1920," Grace Hudson Museum, Ukiah, California, November 14, 1990 – April 7, 1991.

Guest curator. "Focus West: Three Jewish Photographers 1850-1905 (Louis Heller and Elizabeth Fleischmann: Nineteenth Century Jewish Photographers in California)," Judah L. Magnes Museum, Berkeley, California, June 3–October 7, 1990.

Guest curator. "Emma B. Freeman: With Nature's Children," Sutter County Community Memorial Museum, Yuba City, California, January - March 1988.

Guest curator. "Emma B. Freeman: With Nature's Children," Grace Hudson Museum, Ukiah, California, June–September 1987.

Curator. "Emma B. Freeman," Lighthouse Art Gallery, Crescent City, California, January 1987.

Curator. "Louise E. Halsey: An American Pictorialist," Reese Bullen Gallery, Humboldt State University, Arcata, California, January 10–30, 1985.

Curator. "Emma B. Freeman Photographs," Women's History Week, Clarke Memorial Museum, Eureka, California, March 6–12, 1983.

Curator. "With Nature's Children - The Photographs of Emma B. Freeman," Humboldt Federal Savings Bank, Eureka Branch, February 1978; McKinleyville, Branch, March 1978.

Curator. "Historical West Coast Photography: Fine California Views by A. W. Ericson (1848-1927); With Nature's Children by Emma B. Freeman (1880-1928); and Photographer of a Frontier by Peter Britt (1819-1905)," International Center of Photography, New York City, New York, March 18-April 17, 1977.

Curator. "With Nature's Children: Emma B. Freeman (1880-1928) - Camera and Brush," The Nautilus Gallery, Arcata, California, March 5–24, 1977.

=== Online archives ===
Palmquist, Peter E & Women in Photography International Archive, Arcata, California. 2003

Palmquist, Peter E & Women in Photography International Archive. Bibliography of books by and about women photographers in the collection of the Women in Photography International Archive, as of January 1, 2000. Women in Photography International Archive, Arcata, CA. 2000

Palmquist, Peter E. Bibliography of articles by and about women in photography, 1840-1990 (4th ed., unindexed). Women in Photography International Archive, Arcata, CA. 2000
