= The California Field Atlas =

Book by Obi Kaufmann

- Author: Obi Kaufmann
- Illustrator: Obi Kaufmann
- Language: English
- Subject: Ecology of California; geography of California; conservation (ethic)
- Genre: "Field atlas" (sui generis)
- Publisher: Heyday Books
- Publication date: September 1, 2017
- Publication place: United States
- Pages: 552
- ISBN: 978-1-59714-402-5
- Dewey Decimal: 557.94022
- LC Class: G1526.G3 K3
- Website: californiafieldatlas.com

The California Field Atlas is a 2017 book written and illustrated by Obi Kaufmann. It was published by Heyday Books, a Berkeley-based nonprofit small press. Through passages of nature writing and hundreds of watercolor paintings, the book details California's ecology and geography. Kaufmann, an artist and outdoorsman, was born in California and currently resides in Oakland. He prepared the book over the course of a year, drawing from a lifetime of experience hiking thousands of miles of California wilderness. With the California Field Atlas, he intended to foster geological literacy and conservation of the state's natural environment.

The book contains ten chapters spanning more than 500 pages in total. The first eight chapters examine California's ecological system, the ninth chapter is an overview of nature throughout the state's 58 counties, and the final chapter covers the topic of rewilding. Rather than focusing on already-famous natural landmarks such as Yosemite, Kaufmann sought to present a comprehensive overview of the state that included detailed surveys of lesser-known regions.

The title combines the phrases field guide and atlas, but the book differs in purpose and function from both categories as traditionally conceived. The term "field atlas" was coined by the author to describe a new genre of nature writing with elements of deep ecology and systems thinking. According to Kaufmann, a traditional field guide describes the what, and an atlas describes the where, of the natural world. On the other hand, the "field atlas" analyzes how aspects of nature interact and function as a whole.

Upon release, the book became a surprise commercial success that exceeded the expectations of its author and publisher. It sold out several printings—the first on pre-orders alone—and became a bestseller throughout California. Critics gave it generally enthusiastic reviews and it won several regional book awards. Following its success, Kaufmann signed with Heyday to publish four follow-up books about California's water, forests, coast, and deserts, respectively.

== Background ==
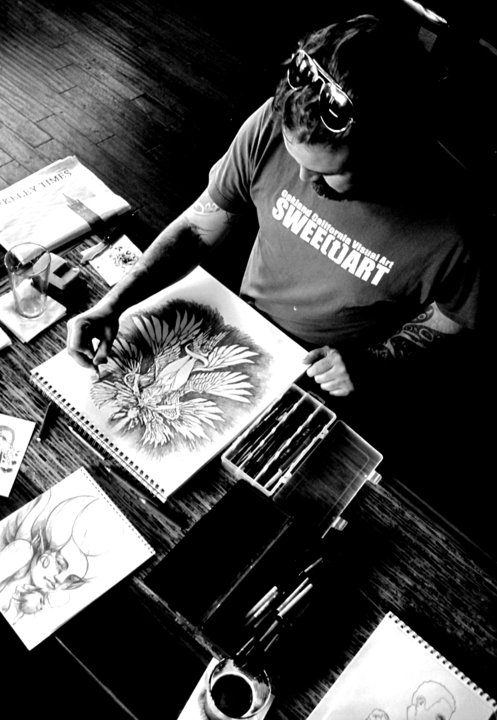
Kaufmann in 2010

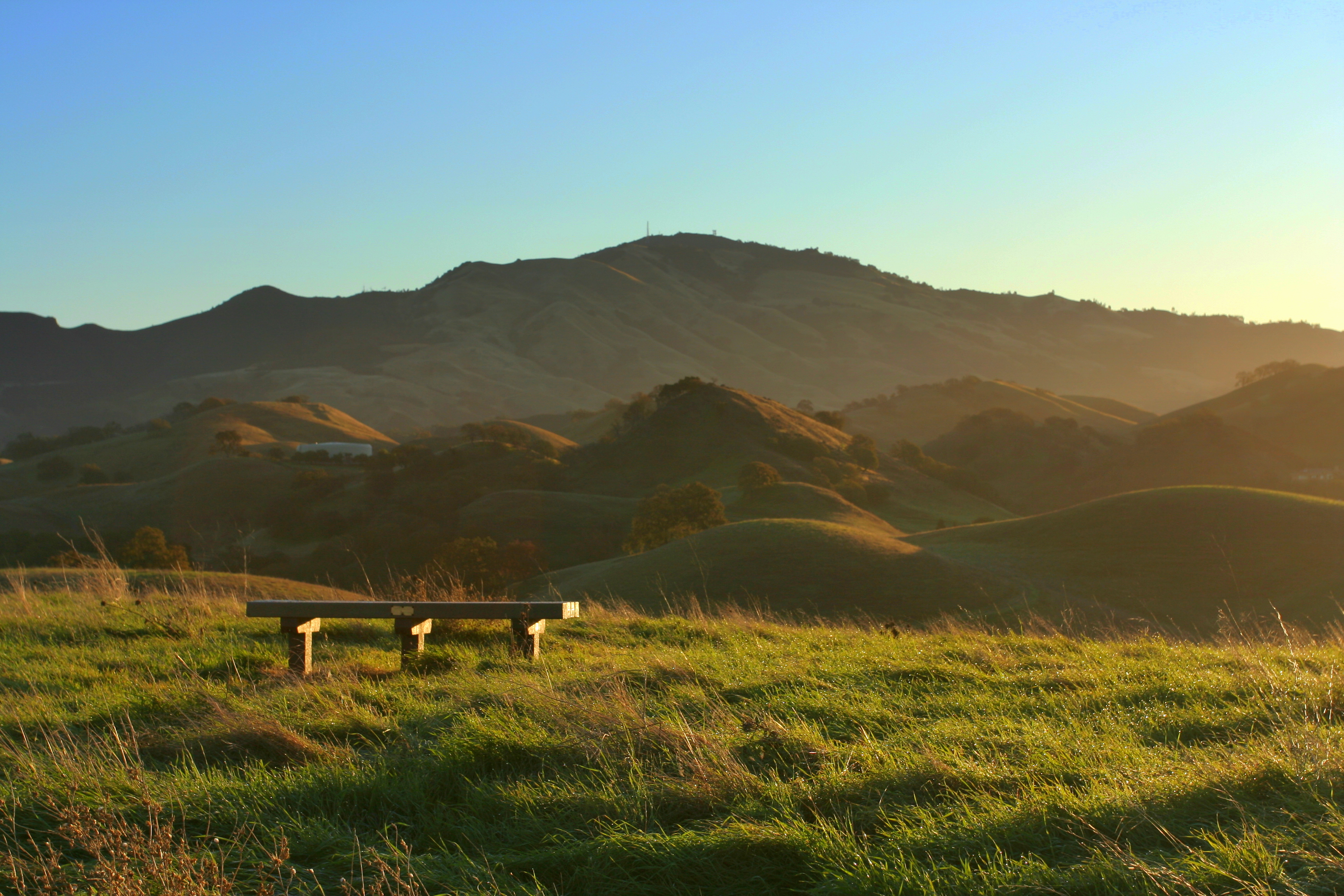
Mount Diablo at dawn

Obi Kaufmann grew up exploring Mount Diablo in the east Bay Area.

Obi Kaufmann was born in Southern California on March 23, 1973. He moved to the San Francisco Bay Area when he was five years old, living in the East Bay town of Danville. He spent much of his childhood exploring Mount Diablo, drawing maps and making up names for its trails.

In adulthood he settled in Oakland, California, where he worked as an artist, gallery owner, and advocate for the conservation movement. He provided nature illustrations for magazines and land trust organizations. In 2015, Lindsie Bear of the Berkeley nonprofit publisher Heyday Books expressed interest in publishing his work. Kaufmann replied that he had been waiting for the opportunity to pitch an idea he had envisioned for 20 years and estimated that the project could be completed with a year of full-time work. He presented a full proposal a week later and impressed Heyday's editors, who saw the book as a once-in-a-decade "unicorn" project.

Kaufmann worked on the Field Atlas throughout 2016. He spent 4,200 man-hours on the book, working from 5 a.m. until 10 p.m. on an almost daily basis. Kaufmann painted every day, sometimes out on hikes. The majority of the paintings were drawn in his studio in Downtown Oakland. While outdoors, he painted natural objects ranging from flowers to mountains by sight. He used photographic models for reference when painting animals. The project was a culmination of Kaufmann's lifetime of observations hiking across thousands of miles of Californian land. Some of the artwork dates back to a decade prior to publication. The initial draft of the book ran over 1,000 pages.

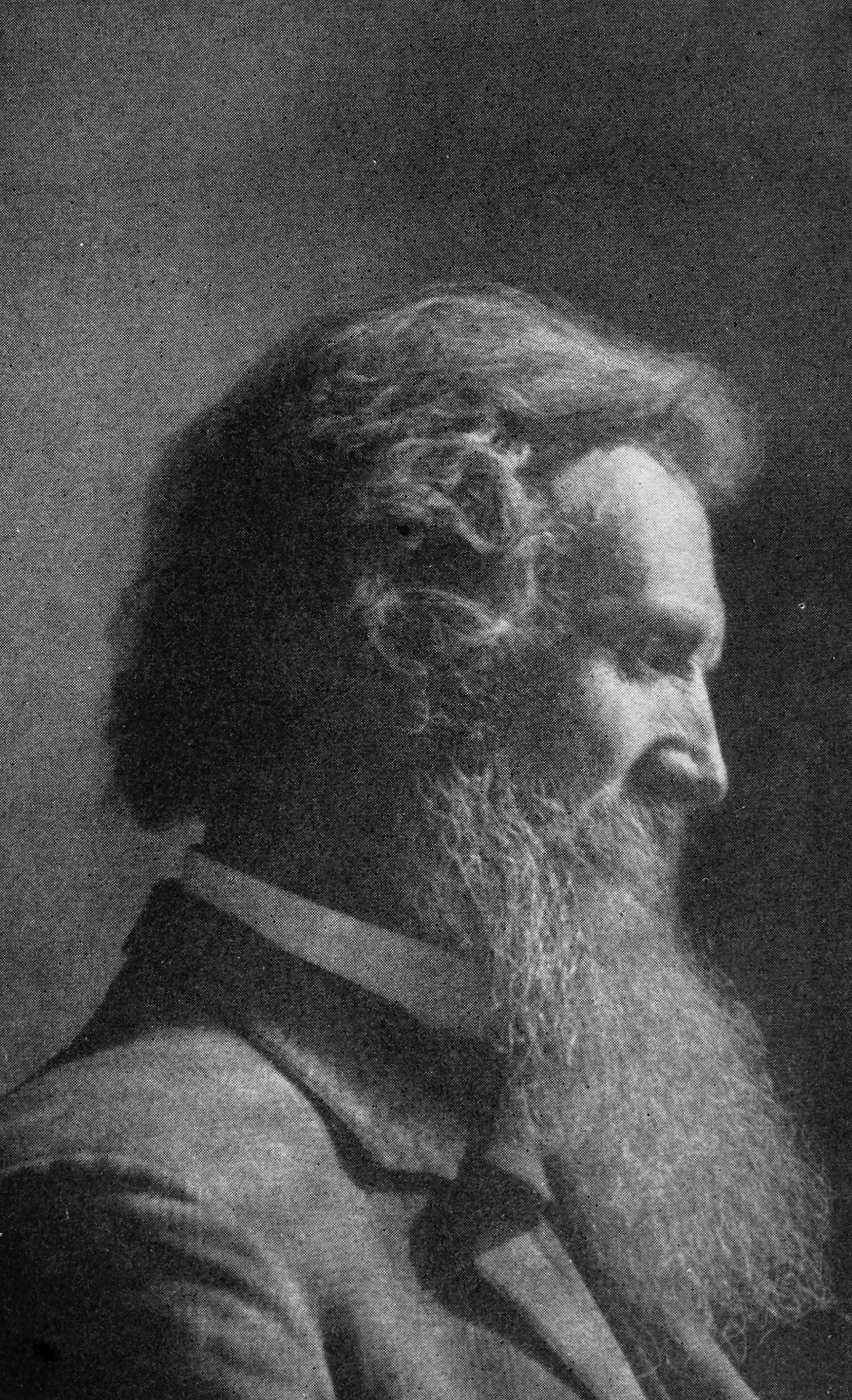
Muir

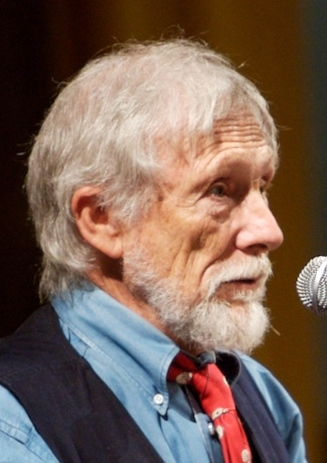
Snyder

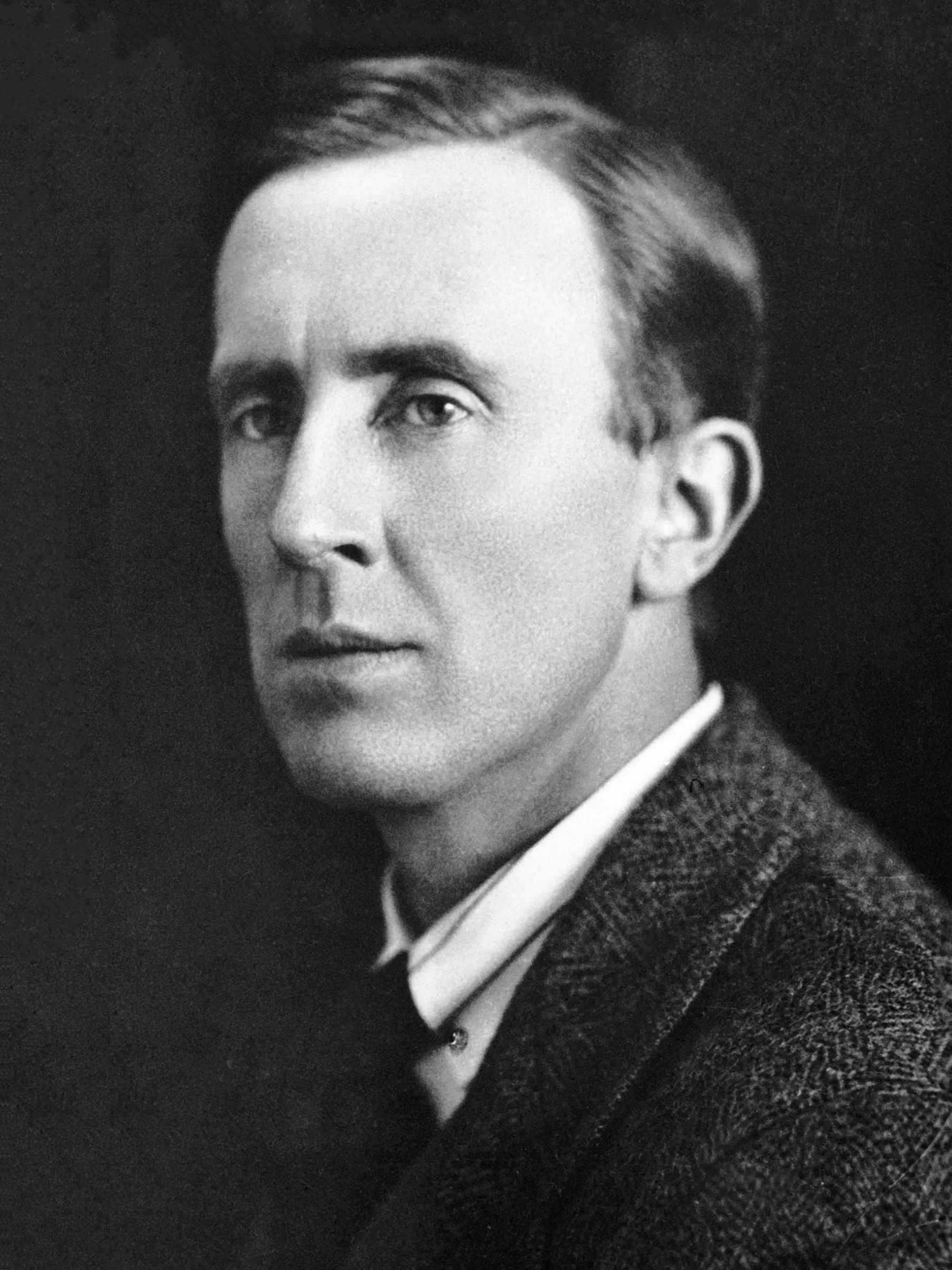
Tolkien

The California Field Atlas was influenced by several writers, including John Muir and Gary Snyder. Kaufmann's paintings were inspired by J. R. R. Tolkien's maps of Middle-earth.

Kaufmann took inspiration from literary naturalists who endeavored "to see things as they are", saying "it may be unexpected" that he drew more inspiration from writers than from his "fellow painters." In particular, he cited the nature writings of David Douglas, John Muir, Wallace Stegner, Gary Snyder, and Joan Didion. He met Snyder, a fellow Californian, in May 2016. After reviewing Kaufmann's work in progress, Snyder asked, "But Obi, what is California?" Kaufmann replied that, speaking for himself in that moment, California felt like both heaven and hell. Greg Sarris's short story collection How a Mountain Was Made (2017) was a source for Kaufmann's depictions of Sonoma Mountain. J. R. R. Tolkien's painted maps were his primary artistic inspiration. Kaufmann declared "California is my Middle Earth" and said he hoped his maps portrayed the state's real environment in much the same way Tolkien had mapped his imagined fantasy realm. Tom Killion, a Bay Area printmaker, was another influence on his art.

In preparation for mapmaking, he researched indigenous names of geographical landmarks and, in the process, learned that the Junipero Serra Peak in the Santa Lucia Range was named after Junípero Serra, the founder of the Spanish missions in California. In Kaufmann's view, Serra was responsible for acts of genocide against the indigenous peoples of California. To express his objection to the mountain's formal name, Kaufmann planned to refer to it by its Salinan name, Pimkolam, instead. However, he was persuaded that such a change would be beyond the scope of his project. He ultimately labeled the mountain with the name Santa Lucia Peak, which had once been in use before it became more commonly known as Junipero Serra Peak.

== Contents ==
The book contains about 600 of Kaufmann's paintings, divided between maps and wildlife paintings. His watercolors and texts spread across 10 chapters and more than 500 pages. The first eight chapters, with titles like "Of Earth and Mountains" and "Of Fire and Forests", describe an ecological system. The ninth chapter is an overview of the 58 counties of California using geographical markers rather than human-built markers like roads. The final chapter presents a case for ecological restoration and conservation of California through rewilding. Kaufmann sought to depict areas of natural beauty across the entire state, even in comparatively under-studied areas such as Colusa, San Joaquin, and San Benito, while avoiding undue focus on well-known tourist settings.

=== Artwork ===
Kaufmann's renderings of animals are mostly realistic but incorporate expressionistic flourishes—particularly in his choices of color palette—and thus do not adhere to the more literalistic standards of accuracy that would be expected from a conventional field guide. His wildlife paintings are meant to capture "the spirit of the subject" above all, and he acknowledged that his approach sometimes resulted in conspicuous differences between his art and an animal's literal appearance. As an example, he has often noted that the book includes a painting of a purple coyote, even though the animal is not actually purple in the wild. However, he explained that "coyotes aren't purple unless you're looking at them in the high desert sagebrush at sunset," and the subjective impression of the animal's appearance that can occur in that rare setting is what he sought to capture in his painting.

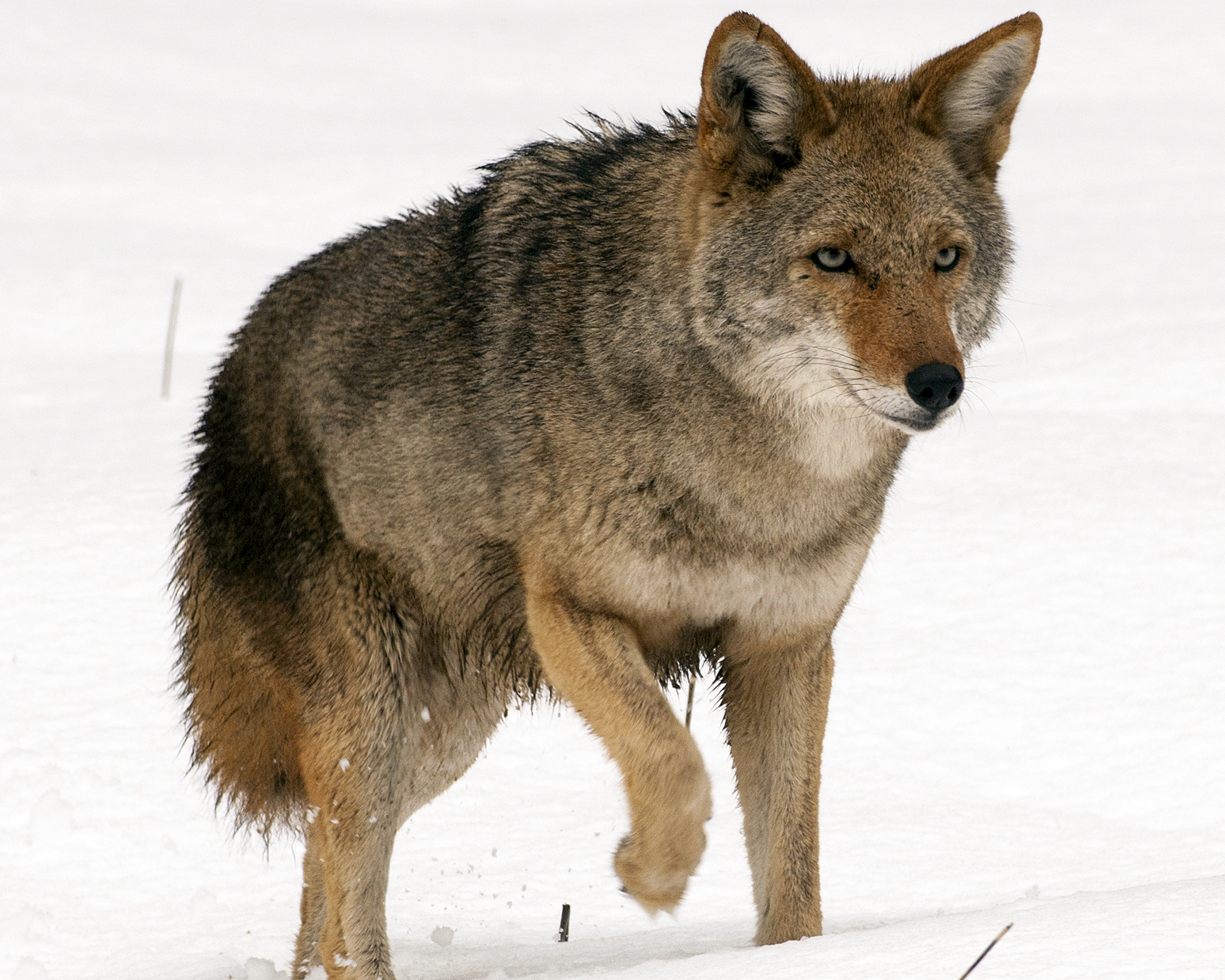
Kaufmann's wildlife paintings are partly realistic, partly expressive—as seen in his illustration, at left, of a coyote tinted purple. The stylistic choice of color for the otherwise-realistic painting diverges from a coyote's literal appearance—compare the photo, at right, of a real coyote seen in Yosemite.

The book's maps include surveys of a wide variety of subjects, like the habitats of wild pigs, the state's various fir trees, areas prone to wildfire, wildflowers gardens, and many others. Each map is indexed with a unique four-digit number. Kaufmann said much of the book is "data-driven", in that the maps and their data are sourced from scientific governmental agencies including the California Department of Water Resources, the National Oceanic and Atmospheric Administration (NOAA), the United States Department of Energy (USDOE) and the United States Geological Survey (USGS).

Although the source maps were freely available online, they were often buried in remote corners of government websites and hard to access. These maps were often low-resolution and in his words "sterile", i.e. used for a single purpose and thus devoid of any richer meaningfulness or context. Kaufmann "reverse-engineered" his maps from these various online sources to make the information more accessible and educationally useful, calling his final product a "reference book for the 21st century".

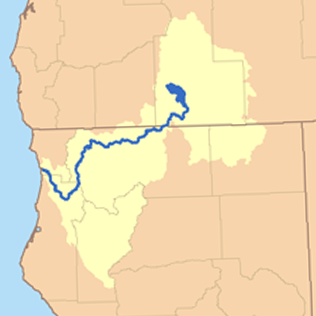
Kaufmann's maps are based on public-domain government data. He used his own legend and artistic interpretation to present geography in a richer, more compelling manner. Compare his map of the Klamath River and its surrounding basin (left) with a generic computer-generated map of the same river created with USGS data (right).

Conveyance of proper scale was his foremost challenge in preparing the maps. Kaufmann noted that most modern readers are acclimated to online maps like Google Maps that allow users to easily zoom in and out, which is impossible to achieve with paint on paper. In order to present an "easily digested, unified vision" with a homogeneous sense of scale, Kaufmann used one simplified legend across all maps. For convenience and uniformity, the legend's symbols flatten some of the differences between certain features. For example, an identical icon is used to describe both a 10-square-mile (26 km^{2}) campground on one map and the much larger Fort Irwin National Training Center—with a total area of about 1,000 square miles (2,600 km^{2})–on a second, larger map.

Given his medium of watercolor, Kaufmann acknowledged the possible presence of errors in declination and small mistakes like inadvertent smudges. Nonetheless, he wrote in the introduction that he believed any imprecisions in the work would fall within a reasonable margin of error, while reminding the reader that the maps were intended first and foremost as "expressive" works and that some of them had been prepared outdoors in uncontrolled conditions.

== Genre and themes ==
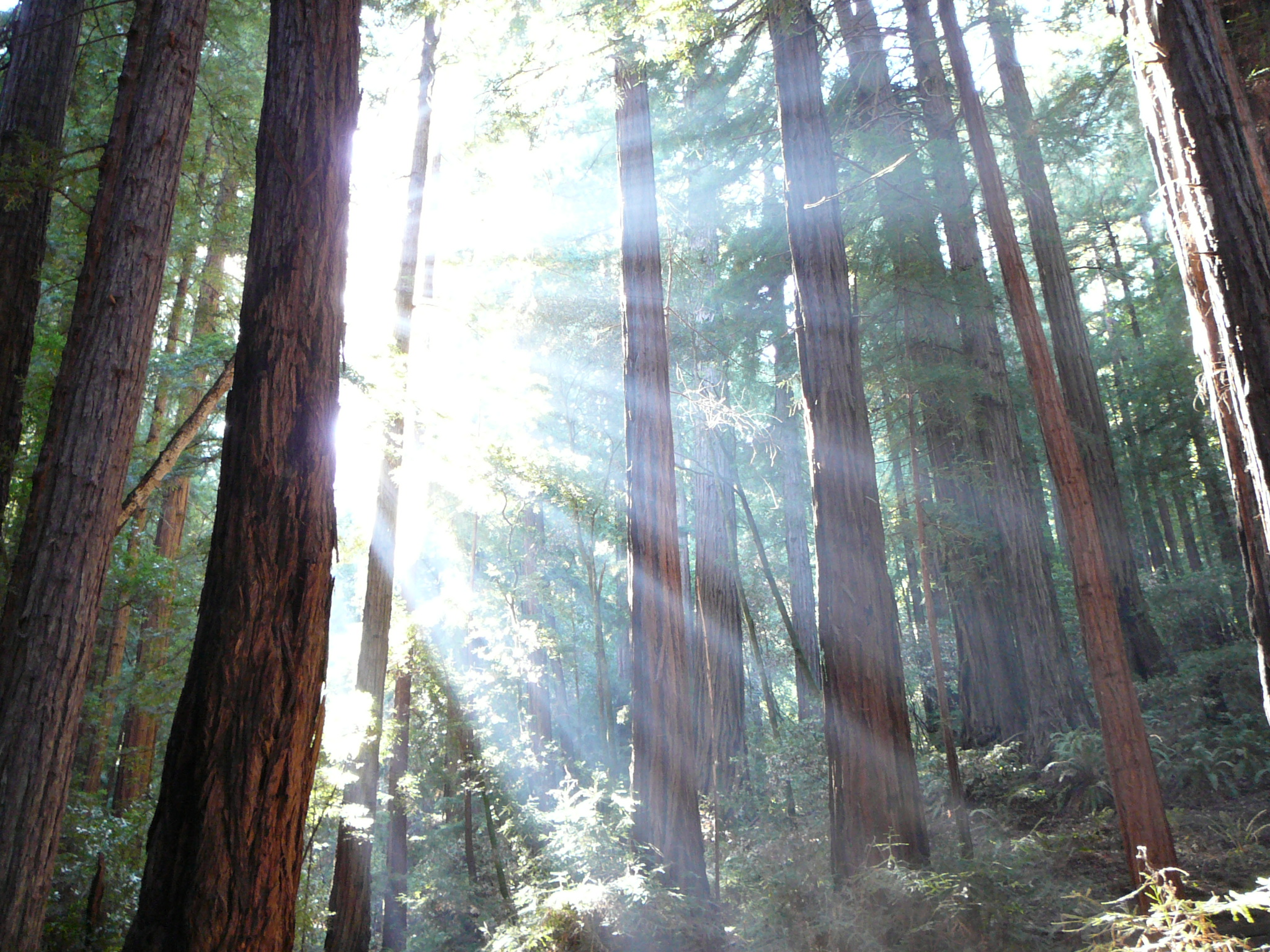
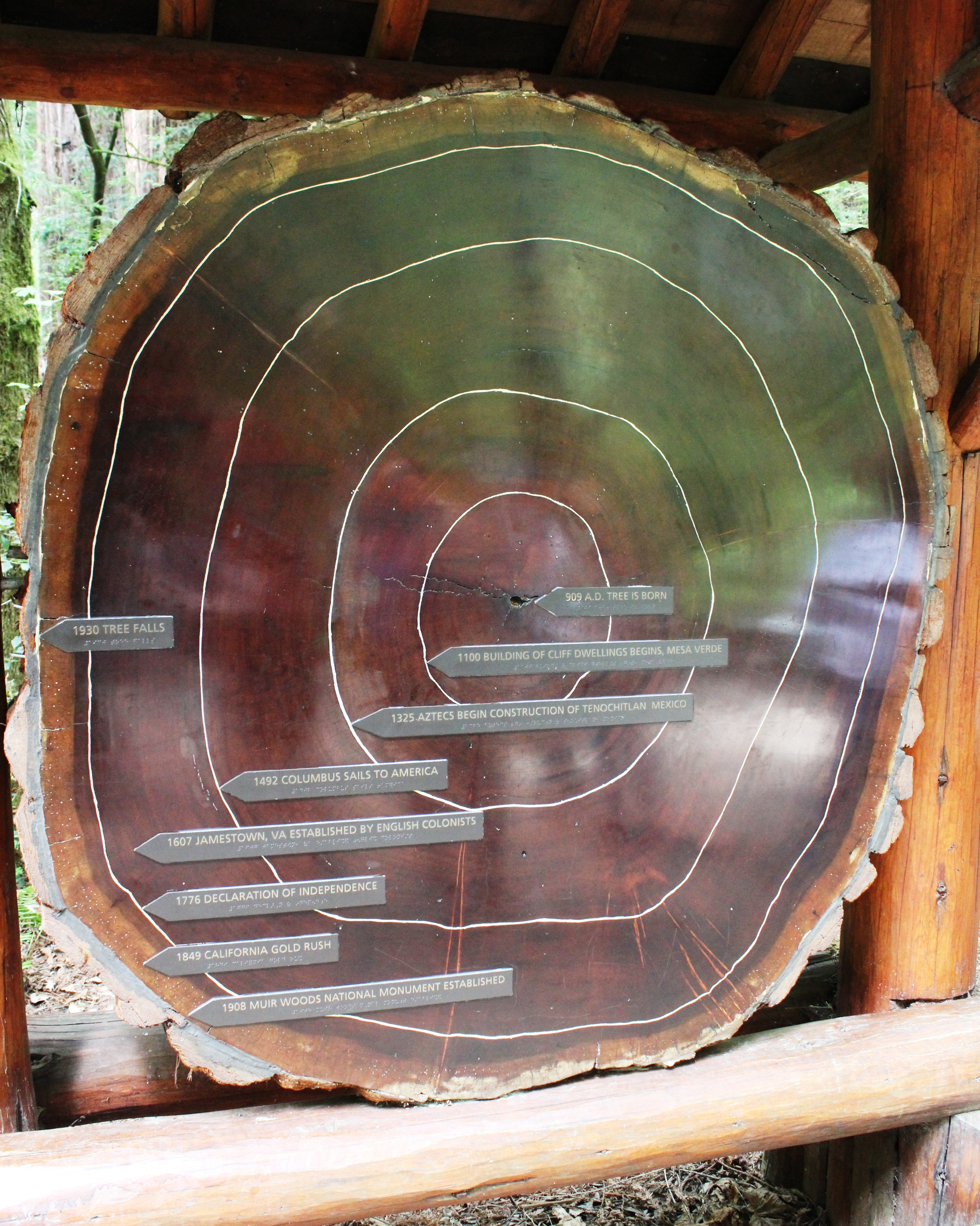
Redwood trees—like these in Muir Woods National Monument—can live to be thousands of years old. The cross-section at right shows the trunk of a tree that sprouted in 909 CE and fell in 1930. Contemplation of deep time and natural phenomena is a significant theme of The California Field Atlas.

Kaufmann has said the Field Atlas is not a field guide and, while it is a book of maps, both the author and several commentators have suggested it is not an atlas in the conventional sense. Instead, Kaufmann employed the term "field atlas" to incorporate elements of systems thinking he saw as missing from contemporary nature writing. He explained:

"Unlike a field guide, which is really all about the what of [things]—like 'what is this stone, what is this butterfly'—or a regular atlas, which is very much all about the where of things, this book is concerned with the how of things. How are things put together? How do these big, living systems of the natural world coalesce and conspire to make this terrestrial paradise of California?"

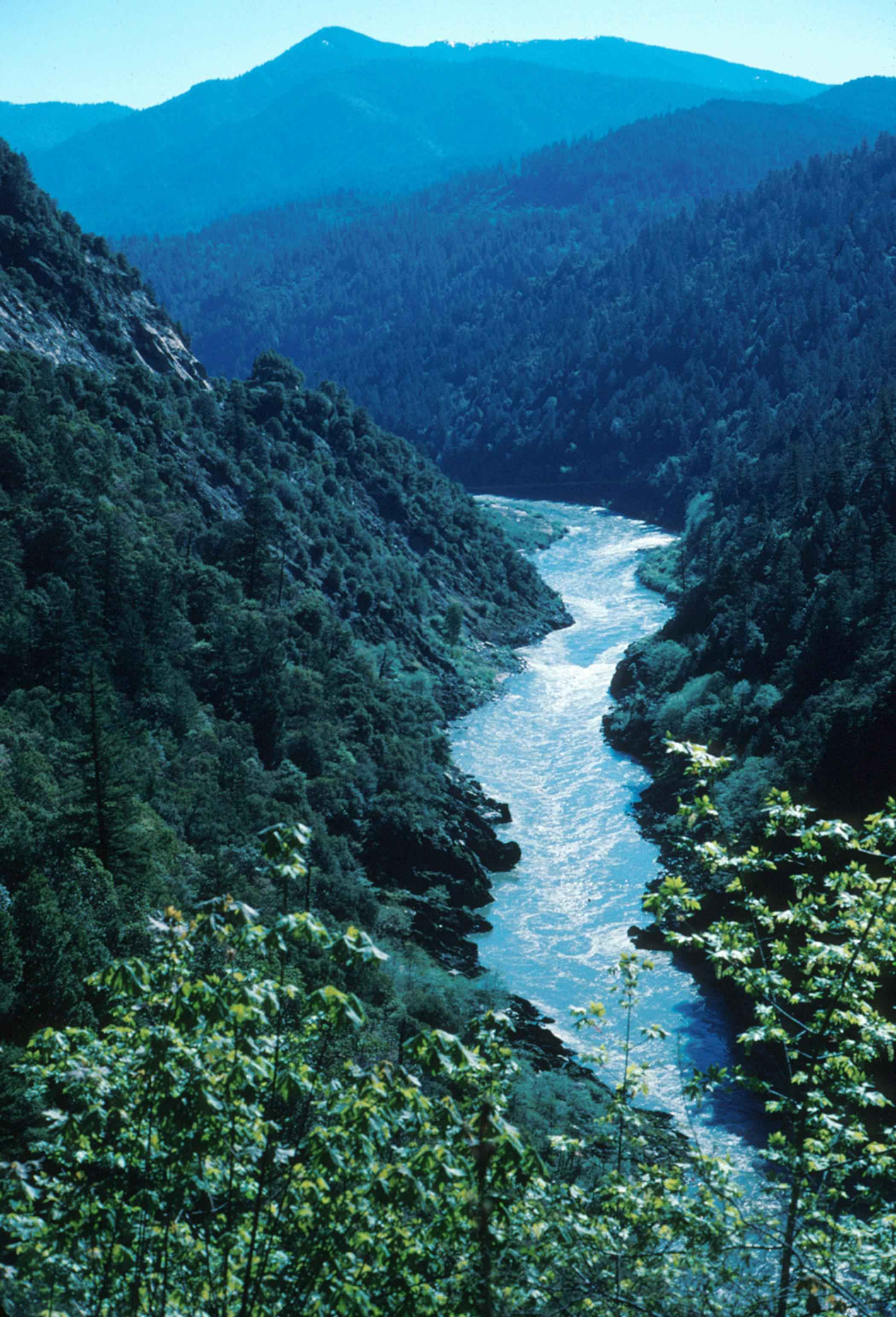
Kaufmann chose to omit human activity from the book. Instead, his art depicts natural features like the Klamath River (pictured) as they would appear without roads or other manmade interference.

He saw the Field Atlas as having two main purposes: a scientific agenda to foster geographic literacy, and an artistic agenda to promote the cause of conservation—the latter of which also has political dimensions. He told the website 7x7 that the "whole book—this whole endeavor—is an exercise in how we can continue our human residency in California not only over the next 100 years, for example, but over the next 10,000 years." On the other hand, Kaufmann sought to avoid any overt political argumentation in the book, and he has expressed frustration with partisan approaches to conservation. Mike Sonksen identified the book—particularly its ecological perspective and sense of "geographic literacy"—with the ideas of deep ecology and bioregionalism as articulated by Kaufmann's influence Gary Snyder in such works as Turtle Island (1974) and A Place in Space (1995).

The book reflects a deep-time perspective on the state's ecology and landscapes. In the book's introduction, Kaufmann wrote that he was "participating in the wild reimagining of the place, past the scars inflicted over the past two hundred years and revealing a story about what has always been here and what will remain long after our residency is through." In an interview, he cited the Klamath River, which he said "will be here a thousand years from now, long after all of our roads have returned to dust from which they are made. That sort of deep-time perspective is the aspect of California that I am so drawn to create and participate in." As a comment on nature's capacity for long-term resilience and endurance, he noted elsewhere that the "redwood tree's toolbox allows it to live for 2,000 years. What calamities would you encounter if you lived that long?"

He omits the environmental impacts of human activity, including roads and urban settings, from his maps and illustrations. Paul Saffo noted that, although humans are not entirely absent, "the Field Atlas exhibits a certain ambiguity regarding the human presence in California ... one cannot escape the sense that Kaufmann would be happier if everyone who headed toward California after 1530 had turned back." While it excludes roads, the book does include some trail maps. Kaufmann said trails "offer so much more of an interesting ecological narrative" than roads because they follow topographical contours and natural features like streams, and the book's attention to trails reflects a "pedestrian ethic".

The maps are not designed as navigational guides for the California wilderness areas, and it is especially not intended as "help if you're lost in the woods". Kaufmann has noted that the book weighs 2 pounds (0.91 kg), making it somewhat impractical to carry on hikes. Instead, he advised readers to use it for planning excursions or the contemplation of conservation efforts. He also advised taking the book on road trips through the state, noting that it could easily fit inside a car's glove compartment.

== Release ==
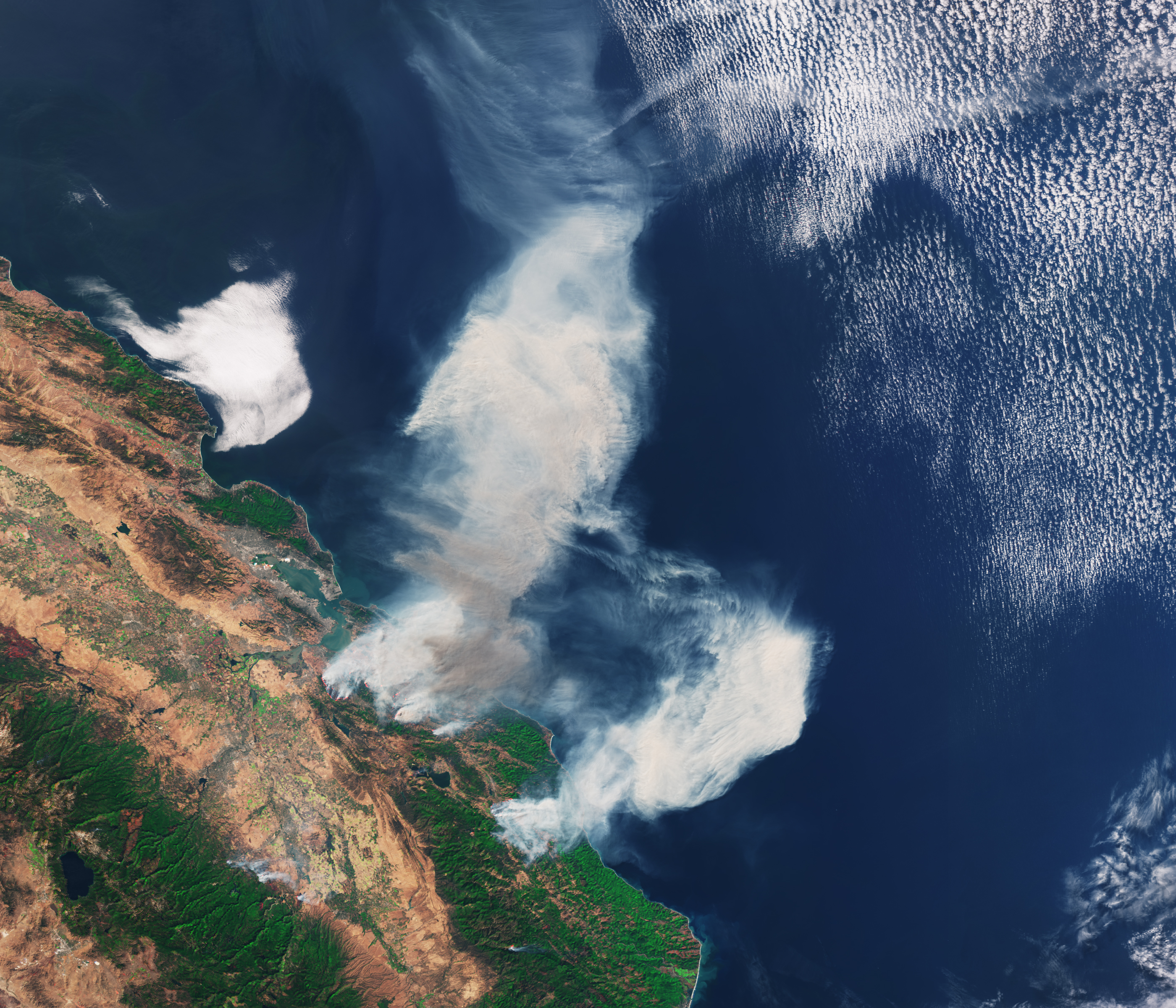
Kaufmann's book tour coincided with the 2017 California wildfires (pictured, in a satellite image from October 2017).

The field atlas was first published in September 2017. Kaufmann undertook a promotional tour of California and the West Coast, which coincided with the 2017 California wildfires. He spoke about the impact of the wildfires and the resilience of nature at several events while promoting the Field Atlas.

To Kaufmann's surprise, the book sold well and became a regional bestseller. The first printing of the book, totaling 8,000 copies, sold out before the book was even released and became Heyday's best-selling first printing in its more than four decades of publishing. With high demand and limited availability, used copies of the book, which retailed for $45, were sold online for prices ranging from $145 to $1,500. The second printing produced 6,000 copies in mid-January, and was sold out by February; a third printing became available the same month. The book spent four weeks in the number 1 spot on the San Francisco Chronicle bestseller list for nonfiction paperbacks. More than four years after the book's first publication, a hardcover "Deluxe Edition" was released through Heyday in November 2020.

=== Critical response ===
The book received generally positive reviews, primarily from local California publications and outlets. John McMurtrie, the book editor of the San Francisco Chronicle, called the California Field Atlas a "magnificent ode to the natural wonders of [Kaufmann's] home state" and said it "stands as one of the finest books ever published by Heyday". The Chronicle later listed it as one of the 100 best books of 2017. In Diablo Magazine, Linda Lenhoff remarked on its "stunning detail" and "passionate plea" for conservation. Judith M. Gallman at Oakland Magazine wrote "[s]cience and animal lovers will find much to cherish in this unusually lovely and hefty collection." Rachael Myrow, a host of Forum on NPR affiliate KQED, compared the book to Rebecca Solnit's Infinite City: A San Francisco Atlas (2010), saying that for both books, the reader is "staring at something you think you know, California, but you're looking at a reading of it that most people don't think of." Kim Wyatt at Lake Tahoe News wrote that the book was "[b]reathtaking and informative and one of a kind" and "will lead to fresh insights about the Golden State, promoting geographic literacy, historical understanding and perhaps, in turn, stewardship of this amazing place we call home."

Ryan Scarrow, in a review published by the academic journal Nature Plants, said that the technical imprecision of the illustrations would leave readers "disappointed" if they were seeking rigorous, scientifically accurate depictions of plant life or a practical, navigational guide. Scarrow also said the book's organization "can lead to more frustrated searching than reading". But he concluded that "[t]hese issues can be overlooked, however, given the sheer pleasure of Kaufmann's artwork and passion for ... geographic literacy," a quality which Scarrow said "not only enriches us in how we read nature, but also how we imagine and bring that nature into ourselves." Writing for the Journal of Alta California, Paul Saffo asked whether the California Field Atlas would be a "one-off, or the first exemplar of a new genre," answering "I suspect that it is the latter, a tome that will inspire others to follow the trail Kaufmann has blazed." Saffo compared Kaufmann to John Muir, and the California Field Atlas to books like the California Water Atlas (1979) and coffee table books published by the Sierra Club in the 1960s that led to the establishment of several national monuments and were influential in the early environmental movement in the United States.

In Entropy, Mike Sonksen said the book was "a revelation", praising the depth of Kaufmann's knowledge, the book's educational value, the quality of his prose, and the aesthetic beauty and detail of his paintings. Sonksen later named it one of the 23 notable books of 2018 for the Los Angeles-area independent TV station KCET. It was named one of Modern Hiker's favorite books of 2018, with site owner Casey Schreiner writing that it "forces you to rethink the way you look at the state and its landscape, and it's gorgeous to look at, too." The travel publication Afar named it one of the "eight essential books for map nerds". In a review of Kaufmann's subsequent book for the Chronicle, Peter Fisher called the Field Atlas a "magnum opus" that "did justice to every facet of natural California—geology and botany, wildlife and weather—in fact-laden prose matched with lyrical watercolors." In October 2019, Olivia Box of Backpacker named the book among nine "new wilderness classics" worthy of entering the canon of great nature writing exemplified by Jack London, saying it "feels both retro and achingly relevant today."

=== Awards ===
The California Field Atlas received several awards. It won the San Francisco Foundation's 2016 Phelan Award for California literature and, as such, was placed in the California Historical Society archives at UC Berkeley's Bancroft Library. At the 87th California Book Awards in 2018, the Commonwealth Club of California recognized the book with a gold medal award for notable contribution to publishing, with a corresponding cash prize of $5,000.

It won the Book of the Year Award in the "regional interest" category from NCIBA (Northern California Independent Booksellers Associated). It was also a finalist in the 2018 Northern California Book Awards, presented by Poetry Flash, PEN West, the San Francisco Public Library, and other bookseller and library-affiliated organizations.

Year	Award	Awarding institution(s)	Result	Ref
2016	Phelan Award for California literature	San Francisco Foundation	Won	
2018	Gold Medal Award for Notable Contribution to Publishing	87th California Book Awards; Commonwealth Club of California	Won	
2018	Book of the Year Award (Regional category)	Northern California Independent Booksellers Association (NCIBA)	Won	
2018	Northern California Book Award (General Nonfiction category)	Northern California Book Reviewers, Poetry Flash, PEN West, the San Francisco Mechanics' Institute Library, Women's National Book Association (San Francisco chapter), the San Francisco Public Library, Friends of the San Francisco Public Library, and Readers Bookstore at the Main Library	Finalist	

== Follow-ups ==
In 2018, Kaufmann announced that he had plans to publish four follow-up books. The next book in the series, The State of Water: Understanding California's Most Precious Resource, was published in June 2019. The State of Water was set to be followed in late 2019 and 2020 by The California Lands trilogy, consisting of The Forests of California, The Coasts of California, and The Deserts of California. The release dates of the trilogy were subsequently delayed until 2020 and early 2021—with the addition of a fifth book, titled The State of Fire: Understanding Why, Where and How California Burns, to be released in late 2021.
