= Obi Kaufmann =

American naturalist and illustrator

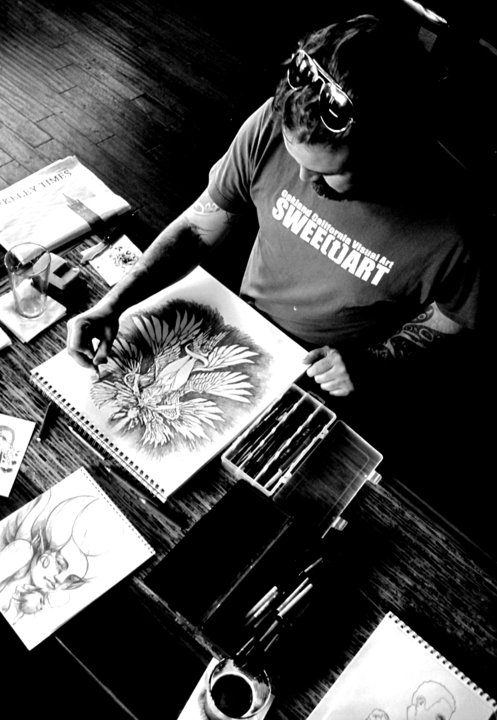
- Kaufmann in 2010
- Born: 1973 (age 52–53) Hollywood, California, U.S.
- Occupation: Illustrator; writer; conservationist; tattoo artist
- Education: University of California, Santa Barbara (BA)

Website
- coyoteandthunder.com

Obi Kaufmann (born 1973) is an American naturalist, writer, and illustrator. He is the author of The California Field Atlas, a guide to the state's ecology and geography. The book features hundreds of his watercolor paintings of maps, wildlife, and other aspects of nature.

== Early life and education ==
Kaufmann was born in Hollywood, California in 1973. His father, William J. Kaufmann III, was an astrophysicist who served as director of the Griffith Observatory from 1970 to 1974, and also a writer of several books about physics. His mother is a clinical psychologist.

In 1978, his family moved from Southern California to Danville, California, a town in the East Bay region of the San Francisco Bay Area. While living there, Kaufmann spent an extensive amount of time exploring Mount Diablo State Park.

Kaufmann studied at the University of California, Santa Barbara (UCSB). He entered as a biology major but switched to visual arts after finding inspiration in wildlife painting and the rock art of the Chumash people. While at UCSB, he took art classes under the painter Ciel Bergman.

== Career ==
After college, Kaufmann lived in the Pacific Northwest before moving to Oakland, California in the early 2000s, where he has resided since. Shortly after his return to the Bay Area, he switched from oil painting to watercolor. He has contributed wildlife artwork to a variety of publications. He was an arts writer for the East Bay Express, an alt weekly serving the East Bay. Beginning in 2009, the brand Juniper Ridge employed Kaufmann as its "chief storyteller"; he eventually quit after he "got sick of selling shit." He later collaborated with the Swedish denim brand Indigofera on a line of natural-fabric clothing. He has worked as a tattoo artist for several years, dating back to his time living in the Pacific Northwest. While he was preparing The California Field Atlas, he only took breaks to go on hikes or to work at a tattoo parlor in Oakland.

Kaufmann is a conservationist and has given talks across California on ecology and preservation of nature.

=== The California Field Atlas and other books ===
In 2017, the Berkeley nonprofit Heyday Books published Kaufmann's first book, The California Field Atlas. The book was a surprise commercial success: it sold out of its first two printings, generating pent-up demand, and became a regional bestseller. It was a recipient of numerous California book awards.

His next book, The State of Water: Understanding California's Most Precious Resource, was released in June 2019. It will be followed by The California Lands trilogy, consisting of The Forests of California (Fall 2019), The Coasts of California (Spring 2020), and The Deserts of California (Fall 2020).
