= List of forts in California =

A map of the site of Presidio of San Diego, which was the first Fort in the State of California in May 1769.

This is a list of military, trading forts, and camps established in what is now the U.S. State of California.

== History ==
Historical affiliations

- New Spain 1769–1821
- Mexico 1821–1847
- United States 1847–

California's military installations began in 1769 with the Presidio of San Diego, establishing a network of four Spanish coastal forts built to secure natural harbors against imperial rivals and support the regional mission system. Following the Mexican-American War, these early outposts were progressively abandoned or absorbed into an expanding network of American coastal defense fortifications. Over the 20th century, the state evolved into a massive, strategic military hub, hosting major installations like the San Diego Naval Base and various aerospace facilities that still support modern global operations.

== List of California forts & military installations pre WWI ==
Name	Allegiance	Location	County	Founded	Abandoned	Type	Notes
Camp Alert	Union Army (United States)	San Francisco	San Francisco	1862	1865	Camp	
Fort Anderson	Union Army (United States)	near Blue Lake	Humboldt	1862; 1864	1862; 1866	Fort	
Fort Baker	Union Army (United States)	near Bridgeville	Humboldt	1862	1863	Fort	
Lime Point Military Reservation; Fort Baker; Fort Barry; Fort Cronkhite	US Army (United States)	Golden Gate National Recreation Area	Marin	1850; 1897	1897; 2002	Complex	
Benicia Arsenal; Benicia Barracks; Benicia Quartermaster Depot	US Army (United States)	Benicia	Solano	1849	1964	Complex	
Fort Bragg; Camp Bragg	US Army (United States)	Fort Bragg	Mendocino	1857	1864	Fort	
Camp Cap Eele						Camp	
Drum Barracks; Camp Drum	Union Army (United States)	Wilmington	Los Angeles	1861	1871	Barracks	
Cantonment Far West; Camp Far West; Fort Far West	US Army (United States)	Marysville (Bear Creek)	Yuba	28 September 1849	4 May 1852	Camp	
Fort Gaston	US Army (United States)	Hoopa Valley Indian Reservation	Humboldt	4 December 1859	29 June 1892	Fort	
Camp Grant	Union Army (United States)	near Dyerville on the Eel River	Humboldt	1863	1865	Camp	
Fort Humboldt	US Army (United States)	Eureka	Humboldt	1853	1866	Fort	
Fort Iaqua	Union Army (United States)	Iaqua	Humboldt	1863	1866	Fort	
Fort Jones	US Army (United States)	Fort Jones	Siskiyou	October 18, 1852	June 23, 1858	Fort	
Camp Lincoln	Union Army (United States)	just west of Jedediah Smith Redwoods State Park	Del Norte	1862	1870	Camp	
Fort Moore	US Army (United States)	Los Angeles	Los Angeles	1847	1853	Fort	Had multiple iterations
Fort Romualdo Pacheco	Mexico	6 miles west of Imperial	Imperial	1825	1826	Fort	
Fort San Bernardino	Mormons (United States)	Downtown San Bernardino	San Bernardino	1851	1862	Fort	
Camp Low	Union Army (United States)	San Juan Bautista	San Benito	1864	1865	Camp	
Fort MacArthur; White Point Military Reservation	US Army (United States)	San Pedro	Los Angeles	1888		Fort	
Fort McDowell	US Army (United States)	Angel Island	San Francisco	1901	1962	Fort	
Fort Miley Military Reservation	US Army (United States)	Point Lobos, San Francisco	San Francisco	1898	1949	Fort	
Fort Miller	US Army (United States)	Fort Miller	Fresno	1851	1858	Fort	
Camp Barbour; Camp Miller	US Army (United States)	Millerton Lake	Fresno	26 May 1851	1 December 1866	Camp	
Presidio of Monterey	New Spain	Monterey	Monterey	1771		Fort	still in use by US
New San Diego Depot; San Diego Barracks	US Army (United States)	New San Diego	San Diego	1850	1879	Barracks	
Camp No. 27						Camp	
Fort Ord	US Army (United States)	Monterey	Monterey	1917	1994	Fort	
Fort Ross	Russian-American Company (Russia)	Jenner	Sonoma	1812	1841	Fort	
Fort Sacramento						Fort	
Presidio of San Diego	New Spain	San Diego	San Diego	1769	1835	Fort	
Presidio of San Francisco	New Spain	San Francisco	San Francisco	1776	1994	Fort	
Presidio of Santa Barbara	New Spain	Santa Barbara	Santa Barbara	1782	1846	Fort	
Fort Point	New Spain	San Francisco	San Francisco	1794	1970	Fort	
Fort Reading	US Army (United States)	Redding	Shasta	May 26, 1852	April 6, 1870	Fort	
Fort Rosecrans	US Army (United States)	San Diego	San Diego	1852		Fort	
Fort Seward	Union Army (United States)	Fort Seward	Humboldt	September 25, 1861	April, 1862	Fort	
Fort Tejon	US Army (United States)	Grapevine Canyon	Kern	June 24, 1854	September 11, 1864	Fort	
Fort Ter-Waw	US Army (United States)	Klamath Glen	Del Norte	October 12, 1857	June 10, 1862	Fort	
Camp Wessels						Camp	
Camp at Nome Cult Indian Agency; Fort Wright; Camp Wright	US Army (United States)	Round Valley Reservation	Mendocino	1858	1875	Camp	
Fort Winfield Scott	US Army (United States)	San Francisco	San Francisco	1852	1995	Fort	
Fort Yuma	US Army (United States)	across the Colorado River from Yuma, Arizona	Imperial	November 27, 1850	1885	Fort	

== List of California forts & military installations post WWI ==
Name	Allegiance	Location	County	Founded	Abandoned	Type	Notes
Bolsa Chica Military Reservation	US Army (United States)	Huntington Beach	Orange	1942	1948	Complex	
Camp Burlington; Camp Burlington-Humboldt; Camp Stephens Grove; Camp Dyerville	Civilian Conservation Corps (United States)	near Dyerville on the Eel River	Humboldt	1933	1942	Camp	
Camp NacimientoCamp Roberts	US Army (United States)	foothills of Santa Lucia Range, between Lake Nacimiento, Bradley, Valleton, and San Miguel	San Luis Obispo - Monterey	1940		Camp	
Fort Irwin	US Army (United States)	near Barstow	San Bernardino	1940		Fort	
Fort Hunter Liggett	US Army (United States)	North of the San Luis Obispo County line, bounded by Pfeiffer Big State Park to the north	Monterey	1940		Fort	
Fort Funston	US Army (United States)	Lake Merced Military Reservation	San Francisco	1939	1963	Fort	
Camp Merriam; Camp San Luis Obispo	US Army (United States)	halfway between the cities of Morro Bay and San Luis Obispo	San Luis Obispo	1928		Camp	
Fort Emory	US Army (United States)	Coronado	San Diego	1942	1947	Fort	

== See also ==
- Geography of California
- List of forts
