= Geo-literacy =

Understanding of geography

As defined by National Geographic, geo-literacy is "the ability to use geographic understanding and geographic reasoning to make decisions".

== History ==
The term "geo-literacy" arose from the National Geographic Society's "Fight against Geographic Illiteracy." The organization released various media to help explain the concept to the general public. In an editorial, Daniel C. Edelson, vice president for education at National Geographic, said, "The National Geographic Society's concern for geo-literacy comes from our mission. We see geo-literacy as providing the tools that will enable communities to protect natural and cultural resources, reduce violent conflict, and improve the quality of life worldwide. However, having a geo-literate populace is also critical for maintaining economic competitiveness, quality of life, and national security in our modern, interconnected world.", and have released various media to help explain it to the general public. In addition, the National Geographic Society set up the Fund for Geo-Literacy, in which donations help fund the printing of materials for education, professional development for educators, and programs to help build awareness of the importance of geo-literacy.

== Components ==
According to Edelson, the three components of geo-literacy are:

- Interactions: understanding of human and natural systems
- Interconnections: geographic reasoning
- Implications: systematic decision-making

== Educational activities ==
Kid World Citizen is a website which provides "multicultural, educational activities to teach...kids about the world", and lists the following "age-appropriate lessons to increase geo-literacy in primary school students":

- Explore different homes around the world and guess why the types of home fit their environment
- Discover why certain cultures celebrate certain holidays, and what is important to them
- Investigate different habitats and biomes, such as the rainforest; look at tangible ways children can prevent their destruction
- Surround kids with geography: study maps, create maps, follow maps, play with maps. The more spatial intelligence is developed at a young age, the more children will understand their place in this world.
- Learn about the water cycle and the conserving and managing freshwater resources
- Research a child's favorite animal, turning it into a global lesson about protecting their habitat and food sources; what decisions can be made that will affect the outcome of this animal?

== Research studies and education projects ==
In 2012, InTeGrate ("a community effort to improve geoscience literacy and build a workforce that can make use of geoscience to solve societal issues") held a Module Author Meeting from May 16–18 on the topic.

== Earlier uses of the term ==
In 2002, Robert E. Nolan of the Education Resources Information Center published a research report/journal article entitled "Geo-Literacy: How Well Adults Understand the World in Which They Live", which included "a test of physical and geopolitical geography...completed by 321 adults". The years of formal education and age were correlated with geographic literacy, and informal learning, such as travel, reading, media, was used as the primary source of geographic knowledge for those with higher educational attainment. A notable finding was that women, regardless of education level, scored significantly lower than men."

In 2001, the Arizona Geographic Alliance launched a project called The GeoLiteracy Project that integrated geography education into reading and writing instruction. In this case, their term GeoLiteracy referred to the integration of geography and traditional language arts literacy.

In 1997, Linda Ferguson and Eva LaMar established an educational project they called The Geo-Literacy Project. LaMar describes geo-literacy as "the use of visual learning and communication tools to build an in-depth understanding -- or literacy -- of geography, geology, and local history."
