= Arizona Geographic Information Council =

Arizona state government committee

The Arizona Geographic Information Council (AGIC) was established by executive order as Arizona's primary forum and oversight group for coordination efforts related to geographic information systems (GIS). AGIC identifies standards and implementation strategies to provide a framework for optimizing Arizona's investment in GIS. Through cooperation and partnerships, AGIC facilitates the acquisition, exchange and management of geospatial data and technology to benefit State agencies and the Arizona GIS community. AGIC meets on a regular basis and conducts an Annual GIS Conference to address statewide GIS issues, requirements and solutions.

== Symposium Conference ==
AGIC hosts an annual training symposium bringing together GIS professionals statewide to share their best practices.

== Data Sharing ==
"The AZGEO Clearinghouse is an initiative of the Arizona Geographic Information Council. AZGEO is designed to provide GIS users with links to Internet map services, FGDC compliant metadata, and geospatial data downloads. Data include GIS layers for administrative boundaries, demographic, environmental factors, hydrology, imagery, indices, mining, natural features, transportation and more."

== Organization ==
AGIC is composed of an Executive Management Board and standing technical committees to advise the Board on technical issues and to assist the Board in the implementation of AGIC programs. Member organizations are:
Arizona Department of Administration
Arizona Department of Commerce
Arizona Department of Economic Security
Arizona Department of Education
Arizona Department of Environmental Quality
Arizona Department of Health Services
Arizona Department of Public Safety
Arizona Department of Revenue
Arizona Department of Transportation
Arizona Department of Water Resources
Arizona Game and Fish Department
Arizona Geological Survey
Arizona State Cartographer's Office
Arizona State Land Department
Arizona State Parks
Arizona State University
Northern Arizona University
University of Arizona
Bureau of Indian Affairs
Bureau of Land Management
Bureau of Reclamation
National Geodetic Survey
Natural Resources Conservation Service
U.S. Forest Service
U.S. Geological Survey
Arizona Association of Counties
League of Arizona Cities and Towns
Arizona Professional Land Surveyors Association
Maricopa Association of Governments
Northern Arizona Geographic Information Forum
Pima Association of Governments
Yuma Regional Geographic Information System

Additionally, one representative from a private sector organization sits on the Board.
