= Ecology of California =

Environments and natural history of California

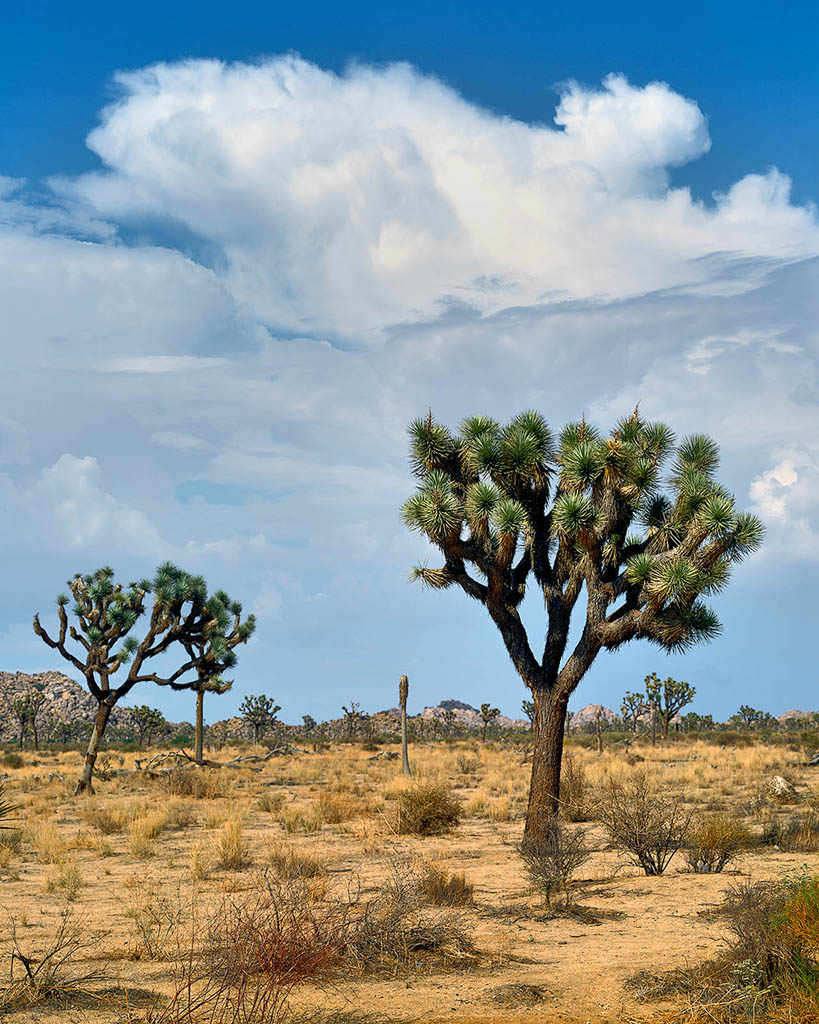
Mojave Desert in Joshua Tree National Park

The ecology of California can be understood by dividing the state into a number of ecoregions, which contain distinct ecological communities of plants and animals in a contiguous region. The ecoregions of California can be grouped into four major groups: desert ecoregions (such as the Mojave Desert), Mediterranean ecoregions (such as the Central Valley), forested mountains (such as the Sierra Nevada), and coastal forests.

Different authorities define the boundaries of ecoregions somewhat differently: this article follows the definitions of the World Wide Fund for Nature (WWF) and the United States Environmental Protection Agency (EPA)

== Deserts ==
California's high mountains block most moisture from reaching the eastern parts of the state, which are home to California's desert and xeric shrub ecoregions. The low desert of southeastern California is part of the Sonoran Desert ecoregion, which extends into Arizona and parts of northern Mexico. California has two high deserts: the Mojave Desert and the Great Basin Desert. The Mojave Desert ecoregion is marked by the presence of Joshua trees. The dry cold Great Basin desert of California consists of the Owens Valley, and is classified into Great Basin shrub steppe by the WWF, and into the Central Basin and Range ecoregion by the EPA.

The deserts in California receive between 2 and 10 inches (51 and 254 mm) of rain per year. Plants in these deserts are brush and scrub, adapted to the low rainfall. Common plant species include creosote bush, blackbrush, greasewood, saltbush, big sagebrush, low sagebrush, and shadscale. Higher elevations have more precipitation, which allows drought-resistant trees to grow, such as western juniper and pinyon pine.

== Mediterranean ecoregions ==
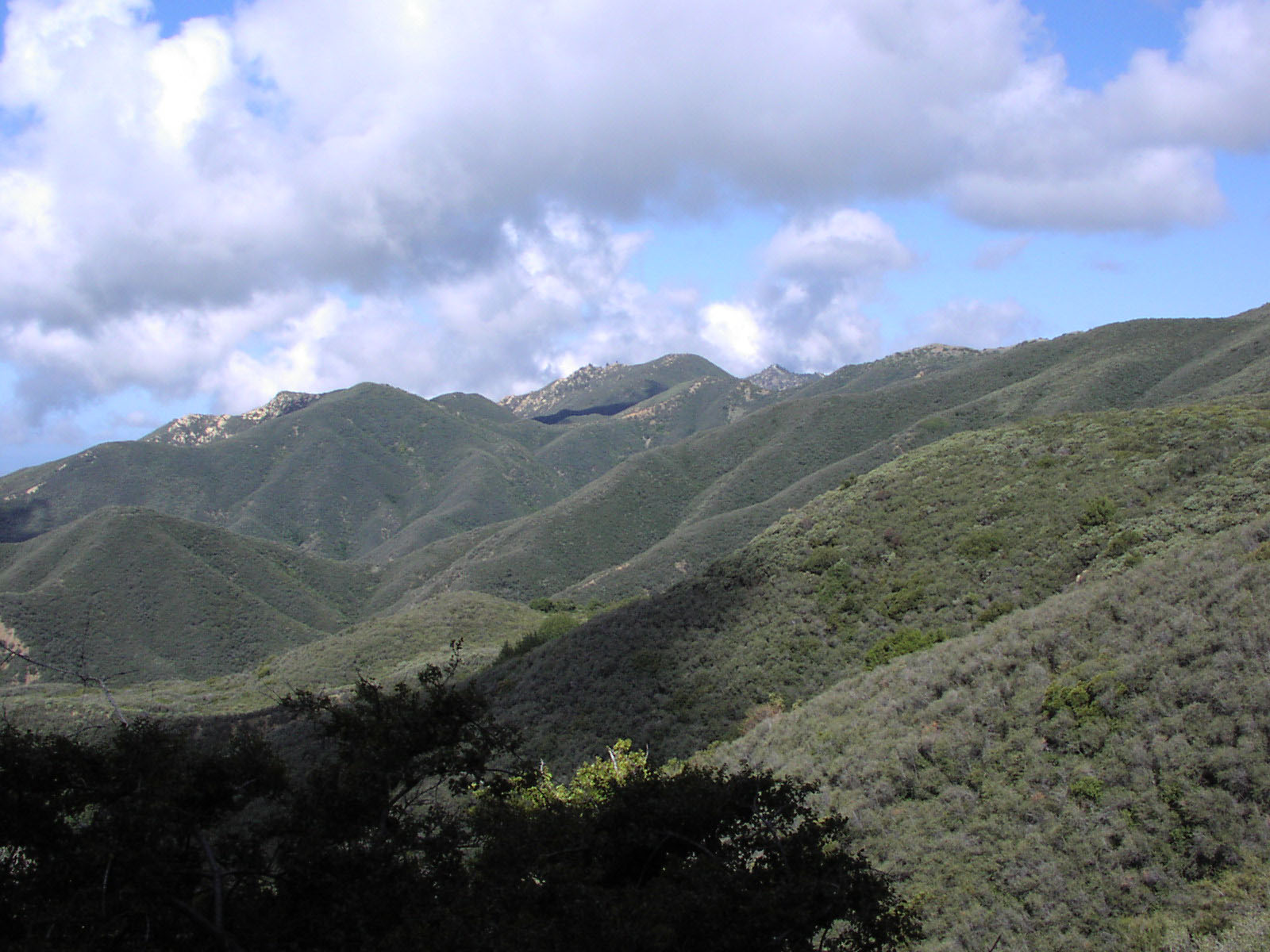
California montane chaparral and woodlands in the Santa Ynez Mountains

The coast of California from Monterey Bay south to the Mexican border, and inland from San Francisco Bay Area to the Sierra Nevada foothills contain California's Mediterranean ecoregions. This region is divided by the WWF into three California chaparral and woodlands ecoregions, plus the Central Valley grasslands. The EPA divides the region between the Central Valley (ecoregion 7), the Southern California chaparral (ecoregion 6), the Southern California mountains (ecoregion 8), and the Southern California coast (ecoregion 85).

The WWF distinguishes between different chaparral ecoregions based on species endemism. In the south, the California coastal sage and chaparral extends across the Mexican border into northwestern Baja California and Los Angeles. The coastal sage ecoregion is notable for having the highest number of native bees in the United States, although much of the ecoregion is now urbanized. The California montane chaparral and woodlands include the Transverse Ranges north of Los Angeles as well as the Santa Lucia Range on the Central Coast. The montane chaparral consists of a mosaic of sage scrub, chaparral, and montane species, depending on altitude. The California interior chaparral and woodlands form a ring around the Central Valley, covering the hills around the Bay Area as well as the foothills of the Sierra Nevada. The interior woodland ecoregion contains several endemic species, due to unique soil types such as serpentine.

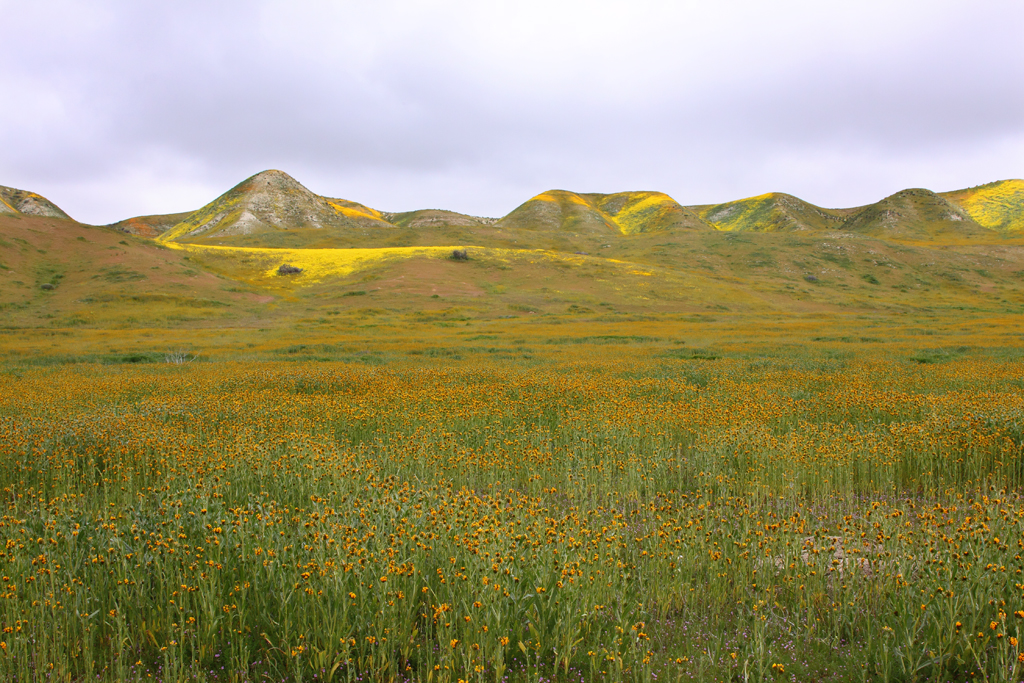
The Carrizo Plain grassland in springtime

These chaparral ecoregions contain numerous plant communities, including oak savanna, oak woodland, conifer woodlands, chamise chaparral, coastal sage scrub, and coastal grassland. These plant communities often occur as a mosaic, caused by fire.

California's Central Valley was once a large temperate grassland containing native bunchgrasses and vernal pools. Grizzly bear, gray wolf, tule elk, and pronghorn antelope used to inhabit the grasslands. The native grasslands and pools have now been largely replaced by livestock ranches and farms. The Carrizo Plain, where the native grass is preserved, is referred to as the "Serengeti of California".

== Forested mountains ==
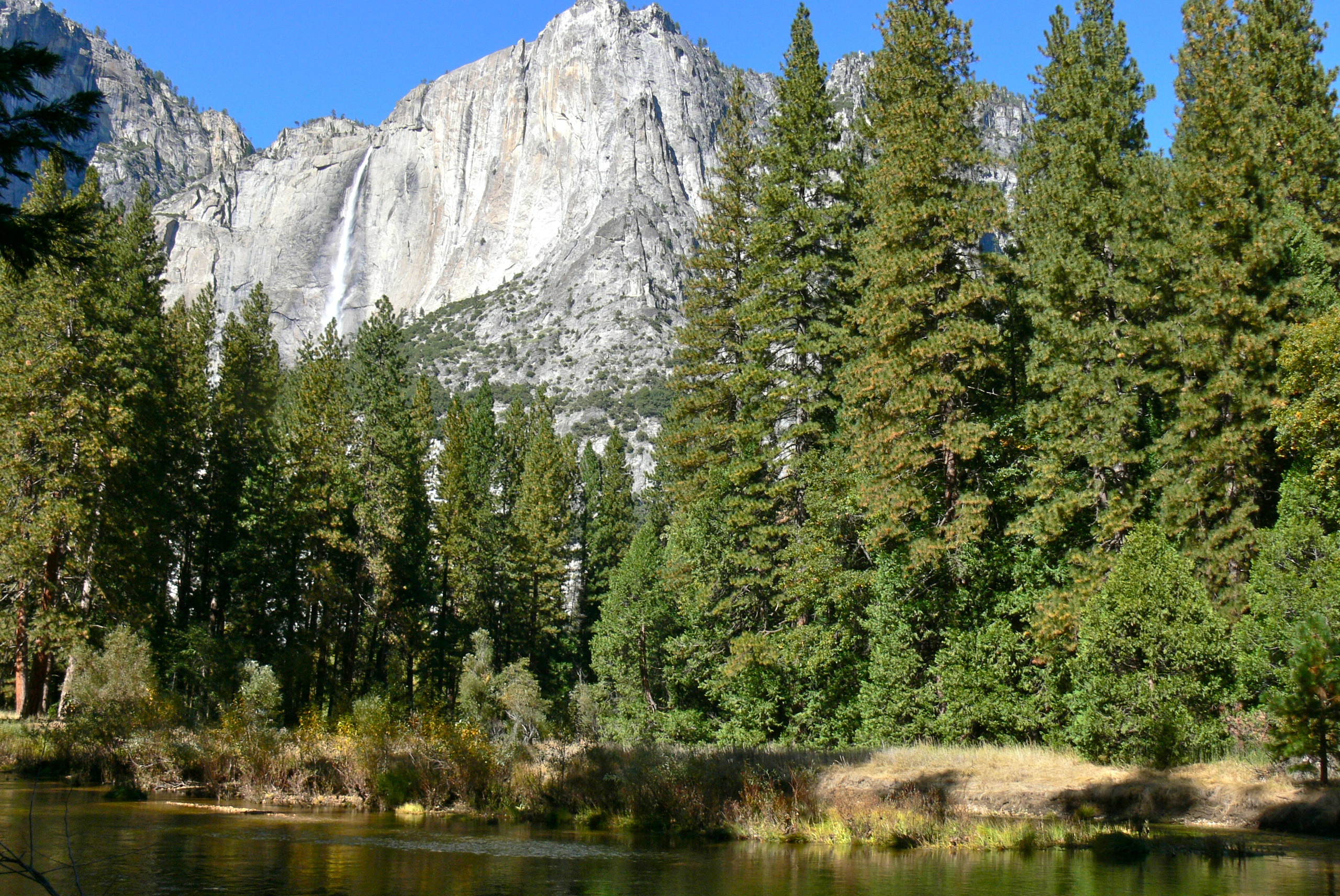
Sierra Nevada lower montane forest in Yosemite Valley

The cooler and wetter mountains of northern California are covered by forest ecoregions. Both the WWF and the EPA divide the mountains into three ecoregions: the Sierra Nevada, the Klamath Mountains, and the Eastern Cascades Slopes and Foothills (occurring on the Modoc Plateau).

The Sierra Nevada are home to half of the vascular plant species of California, with 400 species that are endemic to the region. Like many mountain ranges, the plant communities of the Sierra group into biotic zones by altitude, because of the increasingly harsh climate as elevation increases. These biotic zones include montane forest dominated by conifers such as Jeffrey pine and Lodgepole pine, subalpine forest dominated by whitebark pine, up to alpine tundra which cannot support trees. The Sierra are also notable for giant sequoia trees: the most massive on earth.

The Klamath and Siskiyou Mountains are a notable biodiversity hotspot, containing one of the four most biodiverse temperate forests in the world. The diversity is caused by the ecoregion being adjacent to a number of other ecoregions, diverse soil, and having refugia caused by isolation in the last ice age. Some endemic species in the Klamath mountains are limited to only one mountain or valley.

The Eastern Cascades slopes of the Modoc Plateau are characterized by a mosaic of open ponderosa pine forest, grasslands, and shrublands. Although high, these slopes and mountains are in the rain shadow of the Cascade Range, and hence are drier and more open.

== Coastal forests ==
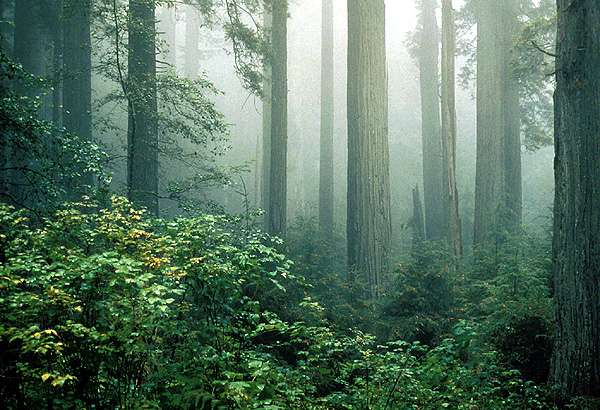
Fog in Redwoods National Park

The coast of California north of San Francisco contains the Northern California coastal forests (as defined by the WWF) and the southern section of the Coast Range ecoregion (as defined by the EPA). This ecoregion is dominated by redwood forest, containing the tallest and some of the oldest trees in the world.

The redwood forests thrive in a thin belt up to 35 miles (56 km) wide next to the coast, where the trees are kept moist by winter rains and summer fog. The redwood forests are also notable for having the highest forest productivity in the world.

== See also ==
- List of California birds
- Fauna of California
- California Floristic Province
- Geography of California
- California native plants
- Protected areas of California
