= List of counties in Nevada =

Independent city and Counties of Nevada
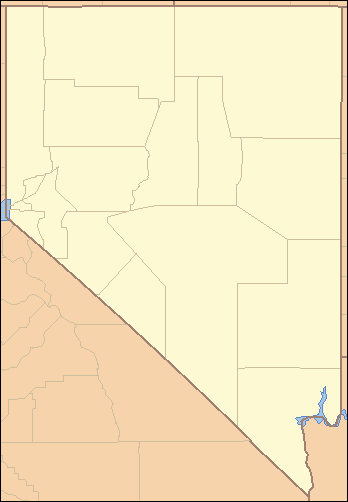
- Location: State of Nevada
- Number: 16 Counties; 1 Independent city
- Populations: (Counties only): 729 (Esmeralda) – 2,407,226 (Clark)
- Areas: (Counties only): 264 square miles (680 km^{2}) (Storey) – 18,147 square miles (47,000 km^{2}) (Nye)
- Government: County government
- Subdivisions: City, Community

There are sixteen counties and one independent city in the U.S. state of Nevada. On November 25, 1861, the first Nevada Territorial Legislature established nine counties. Nevada was admitted to the Union on October 31, 1864, with 11 counties. In 1969, Ormsby County and Carson City were consolidated into a single municipal government known as Carson City.

The FIPS county code is the five-digit Federal Information Processing Standard (FIPS) code which uniquely identifies counties and county equivalents in the United States. The three-digit number is unique to each individual county within a state, but to be unique within the entire United States, it must be prefixed by the state code. This means that, for example, while Churchill County, Nevada is 001, Alameda County, California and Baker County, Oregon are also 001. To uniquely identify Churchill County, Nevada, one must use the state code of 32 plus the county code of 001; therefore, the unique nationwide identifier for Churchill County, Nevada is 32001. The links in the column FIPS County Code are to the Census Bureau Info page for that county.

== Counties ==
County	FIPS code	County seat	Est.	Origin	Etymology	Population	Area	Map
Carson City	510	(Independent city)	July 1, 1969	Founded 1858, consolidated with Ormsby county in 1969.	Carson River, named in turn for Christopher Houston (Kit) Carson (1809–1868), the frontier scout and soldier.	58,571	144 sq mi (373 km^{2})	State map highlighting Carson City
Churchill County	001	Fallon	November 25, 1861	Original	Sylvester Churchill (1783–1862), a general in the Mexican–American War.	25,851	4,929 sq mi (12,766 km^{2})	State map highlighting Churchill County
Clark County	003	Las Vegas	July 1, 1909	Lincoln County	William A. Clark (1839–1925), former United States Senator from Montana, and builder of a railroad line through the area.	2,407,226	7,911 sq mi (20,489 km^{2})	State map highlighting Clark County
Douglas County	005	Minden	November 25, 1861	Original	Stephen Arnold Douglas (1813–1861), former United States Senator from Illinois.	50,111	710 sq mi (1,839 km^{2})	State map highlighting Douglas County
Elko County	007	Elko	March 5, 1869	Lander County	A Shoshoni word meaning white woman. It is said, among the very old Shoshoni, that this is where they first saw a white woman.	54,815	17,182 sq mi (44,501 km^{2})	State map highlighting Elko County
Esmeralda County	009	Goldfield	November 25, 1861	Original	Esmeralda Mining District, named in turn for the legend that a massive amount of emeralds was buried in what is now Nevada. Esmeralda is the Spanish and Portuguese word for emerald.	729	3,589 sq mi (9,295 km^{2})	State map highlighting Esmeralda County
Eureka County	011	Eureka	March 20, 1873	Lander County	Greek expression Eureka, meaning I have found it!, in reference to deposits of silver found in the vicinity.	1,867	4,176 sq mi (10,816 km^{2})	State map highlighting Eureka County
Humboldt County	013	Winnemucca	November 25, 1861	Original	Humboldt River, named in turn for Alexander von Humboldt (1769–1859), a German naturalist and explorer.	17,267	9,658 sq mi (25,014 km^{2})	State map highlighting Humboldt County
Lander County	015	Battle Mountain	December 19, 1862	Churchill County & Humboldt County	Frederick W. Lander (1821–1862), an American Civil War general and developer of the area.	5,872	5,798 sq mi (15,017 km^{2})	State map highlighting Lander County
Lincoln County	017	Pioche	February 26, 1866	Nye County and territory ceded by Arizona.	Abraham Lincoln (1809–1865), the sixteenth President of the United States.	4,320	10,635 sq mi (27,545 km^{2})	State map highlighting Lincoln County
Lyon County	019	Yerington	November 25, 1861	Original	General Nathaniel Lyon (1818–1861), who was killed in action at the Battle of Wilson's Creek.	65,088	1,994 sq mi (5,164 km^{2})	State map highlighting Lyon County
Mineral County	021	Hawthorne	February 10, 1911	Esmeralda County	Mineral deposits in the area.	4,407	3,757 sq mi (9,731 km^{2})	State map highlighting Mineral County
Nye County	023	Tonopah	February 16, 1864	Esmeralda County	James W. Nye (1815–1876), a governor of the Nevada Territory and U.S. senator from Nevada.	57,336	18,147 sq mi (47,001 km^{2})	State map highlighting Nye County
Pershing County	027	Lovelock	March 18, 1919	Humboldt County	John Joseph (Black Jack) Pershing (1860–1948), the World War I general.	6,421	6,009 sq mi (15,563 km^{2})	State map highlighting Pershing County
Storey County	029	Virginia City	November 25, 1861	Original	Edward Farris Storey (1829–1860), a captain killed at Pyramid Lake in the 1860 Paiute War.	4,260	264 sq mi (684 km^{2})	State map highlighting Storey County
Washoe County	031	Reno	November 25, 1861	Original	The Washoe, a small Indian tribe that inhabits the area.	509,386	6,342 sq mi (16,426 km^{2})	State map highlighting Washoe County
White Pine County	033	Ely	April 1, 1869	Lander County	Heavy growth of pine trees in the area, thought to be white pine.	8,661	8,877 sq mi (22,991 km^{2})	State map highlighting White Pine County

== Racial / Ethnic Profile of counties in Nevada (2020 Census) ==
Racial / Ethnic Profile of counties in Nevada (2020 Census)
Following is a table of counties in Nevada by race/ethnicity. The majority racial/ethnic group is coded per the key below.

Majority minority with no dominant group
Majority White
Majority Black
Majority Hispanic
Majority Asian
Majority Native American

Racial and ethnic composition of counties in Nevada (2020 Census) (NH = Non-Hispanic) Note: the US Census treats Hispanic/Latino as an ethnic category. This table excludes Latinos from the racial categories and assigns them to a separate category. Hispanics/Latinos may be of any race.
County	Location of County	Total Population	White alone (NH)	%	Black or African American alone (NH)	%	Native American or Alaska Native alone (NH)	%	Asian alone (NH)	%	Pacific Islander alone (NH)	%	Other race alone (NH)	%	Mixed race or Multiracial (NH)	%	Hispanic or Latino (any race)	%
Churchill		25,516	17,870	70.03%	428	1.68%	1,006	3.94%	640	2.51%	87	0.34%	143	0.56%	1,756	6.88%	3,586	14.05%
Clark		2,265,461	892,802	39.41%	275,002	12.14%	8,487	0.37%	231,972	10.24%	18,877	0.83%	12,890	0.57%	124,015	5.47%	701,416	30.96%
Douglas		49,488	38,856	78.52%	183	0.37%	807	1.63%	898	1.81%	81	0.16%	240	0.48%	2,282	4.61%	6,141	12.41%
Elko		53,702	34,177	63.64%	494	0.92%	2,378	4.43%	555	1.03%	85	0.16%	247	0.46%	2,174	4.05%	13,592	25.31%
Esmeralda		729	521	71.47%	4	0.55%	20	2.74%	4	0.55%	0	0.00%	0	0.00%	41	5.62%	139	19.07%
Eureka		1,855	1,545	83.29%	2	0.11%	21	1.13%	4	0.22%	3	0.16%	11	0.59%	91	4.91%	178	9.60%
Humboldt		17,285	11,032	63.82%	137	0.79%	571	3.30%	152	0.88%	26	0.15%	199	1.15%	657	3.80%	4,511	26.10%
Lander		5,734	3,975	69.32%	7	0.12%	206	3.59%	27	0.47%	10	0.17%	19	0.33%	234	4.08%	1,256	21.90%
Lincoln		4,499	3,838	85.31%	168	3.73%	26	0.58%	21	0.47%	13	0.29%	9	0.20%	130	2.89%	294	6.53%
Lyon		59,235	42,350	71.49%	488	0.82%	1,083	1.83%	924	1.56%	168	0.28%	252	0.43%	3,631	6.13%	10,339	17.45%
Mineral		4,554	2,858	62.76%	161	3.54%	711	15.61%	64	1.41%	8	0.18%	16	0.35%	228	5.01%	508	11.16%
Nye		51,591	37,313	72.32%	1,496	2.90%	620	1.20%	1,028	1.99%	217	0.42%	291	0.56%	2,699	5.23%	7,927	15.37%
Pershing		6,650	4,197	63.11%	322	4.84%	198	2.98%	109	1.64%	8	0.12%	21	0.32%	296	4.45%	1,499	22.54%
Storey		4,104	3,338	81.34%	24	0.58%	38	0.93%	67	1.63%	8	0.19%	34	0.83%	255	6.21%	340	8.28%
Washoe		486,492	287,862	59.17%	11,527	2.37%	5,790	1.19%	28,063	5.77%	3,250	0.67%	2,485	0.51%	25,311	5.20%	122,204	25.12%
White Pine		9,080	6,354	69.98%	438	4.82%	358	3.94%	105	1.16%	19	0.21%	22	0.24%	327	3.60%	1,457	16.05%
Carson City		58,639	37,064	63.21%	1,079	1.84%	1,072	1.83%	1,358	2.32%	110	0.19%	292	0.50%	2,794	4.76%	14,870	25.36%

== Defunct counties ==
- Bullfrog County, Nevada, formed in 1987 from part of Nye county. Creation was declared unconstitutional and abolished in 1989.
- Lake County, Nevada, one of the original nine counties formed in 1861. Renamed Roop County in 1862. Part became Lassen County, California in 1864. Nevada remainder annexed in 1883 to Washoe county.
- Ormsby County, Nevada, one of the original nine counties formed in 1861. Consolidated in 1969 with the county seat, Carson City, forming the independent city of that name.
