= 1860 in the United States =

- Decades: 1840s; 1850s; 1860s; 1870s; 1880s
- See also: History of the United States (1849–1865); Timeline of United States history (1860–1899); List of years in the United States

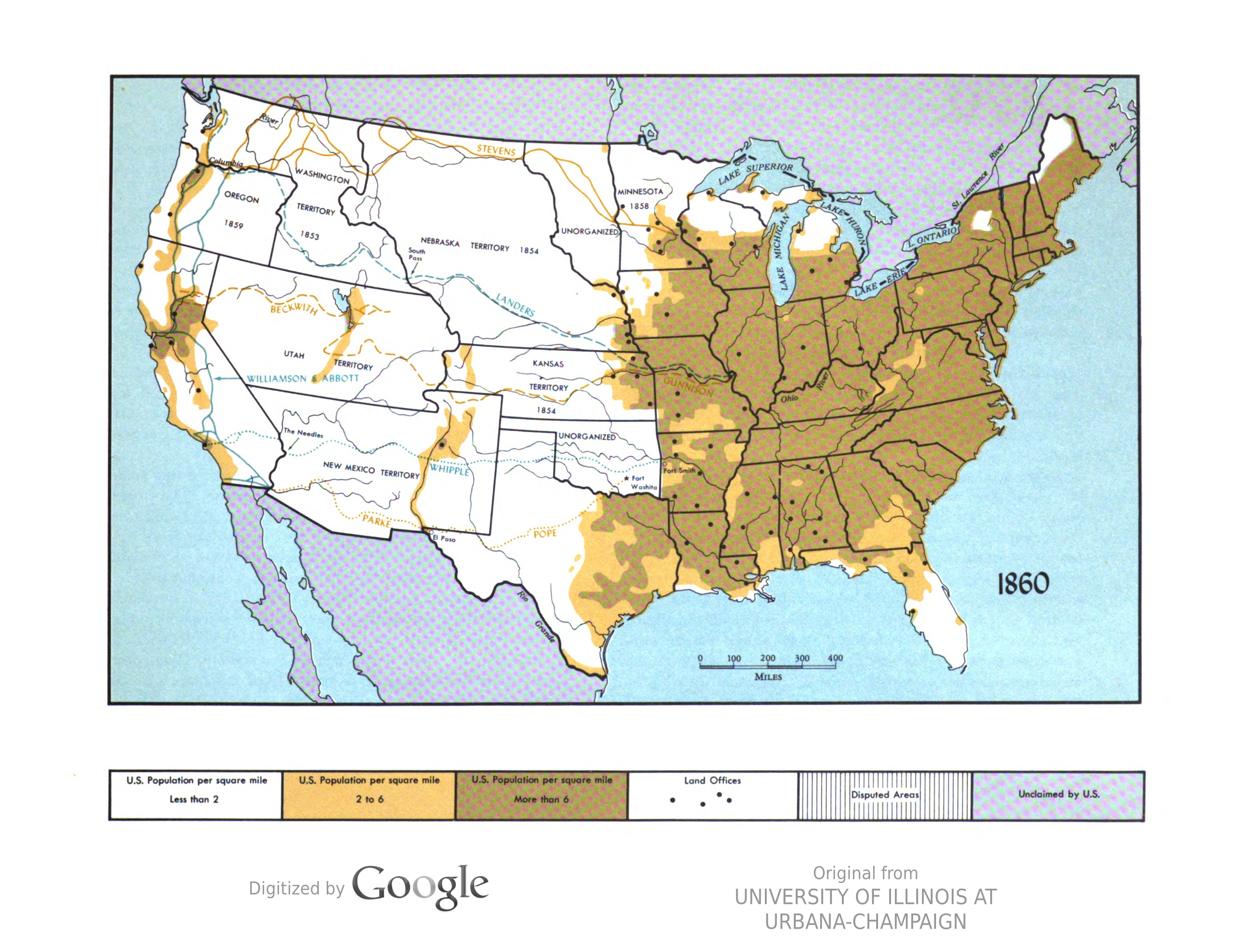
1860 in the United States

Events from the year 1860 in the United States.

== Incumbents ==
=== Federal government ===
- President: James Buchanan (D-Pennsylvania)
- Vice President: John C. Breckinridge (D-Kentucky)
- Chief Justice: Roger B. Taney (Maryland)
- Speaker of the House of Representatives: William Pennington (R-New Jersey)
- Congress: 36th

==== State governments ====
Governors and lieutenant governors

=== Governors ===
- Governor of Alabama: Andrew B. Moore (Democratic)
- Governor of Arkansas: Elias Nelson Conway (Democratic) (until November 16), Henry Massey Rector (Democratic) (starting November 16)
- Governor of California:
  - until January 9: John B. Weller (Democratic)
  - January 9–14: Milton Latham (Democratic)
  - starting January 14: John G. Downey (Democratic)
- Governor of Connecticut: William A. Buckingham (Republican)
- Governor of Delaware: William Burton (Democratic)
- Governor of Florida: Madison S. Perry (Democratic)
- Governor of Georgia: Joseph E. Brown (Democratic)
- Governor of Illinois: William Henry Bissell (Republican) (until March 18), John Wood (Republican) (starting March 18)
- Governor of Indiana: Ashbel P. Willard (Democratic) (until October 4), Abram A. Hammond (Democratic) (starting October 4)
- Governor of Iowa: Ralph P. Lowe (Republican) (until January 11), Samuel J. Kirkwood (Republican) (starting January 11)
- Governor of Kentucky: Beriah Magoffin (Democratic)
- Governor of Louisiana: Robert C. Wickliffe (Democratic) (until January 23), Thomas Overton Moore (Democratic) (starting January 23)
- Governor of Maine: Lot M. Morrill (Democratic)
- Governor of Maryland: Thomas H. Hicks (Know Nothing)/(Republican)
- Governor of Massachusetts: Nathaniel Prentice Banks (Republican)
- Governor of Michigan: Moses Wisner (Republican)
- Governor of Minnesota: Henry H. Sibley (Democratic) (until January 2), Alexander Ramsey (Republican) (starting January 2)
- Governor of Mississippi: John J. Pettus (Democratic)
- Governor of Missouri: Robert Marcellus Stewart (Democratic)
- Governor of New Hampshire: Ichabod Goodwin (Republican)
- Governor of New Jersey: William A. Newell (Republican) (until January 17), Charles Smith Olden (Republican) (starting January 17)
- Governor of New York: Edwin D. Morgan (Republican)
- Governor of North Carolina: John Willis Ellis (Democratic)
- Governor of Ohio: Salmon P. Chase (Republican) (until January 9), William Dennison (Republican) (starting January 9)
- Governor of Oregon: John Whiteaker (Democratic)
- Governor of Pennsylvania: William F. Packer (Democratic)
- Governor of Rhode Island: Thomas G. Turner (Republican) (until May 29), William Sprague IV (Republican) (starting May 29)
- Governor of South Carolina: William Henry Gist (Democratic) (until December 14), Francis Wilkinson Pickens (Democratic) (starting December 14)
- Governor of Tennessee: Isham G. Harris (Democratic)
- Governor of Texas: Sam Houston (Independent)
- Governor of Vermont: Hiland Hall (Republican) (until October 12), Erastus Fairbanks (Republican) (starting October 12)
- Governor of Virginia: Henry A. Wise (Democratic) (until January 1), John Letcher (Democratic) (starting January 1)
- Governor of Wisconsin: Alexander W. Randall (Republican)

=== Lieutenant governors ===
- Lieutenant Governor of California:
  - until January 9: John Walkup (Democratic)
  - January 9–20: John Gately Downey (Democratic)
  - starting January 20: Isaac N. Quinn (Democratic)
- Lieutenant Governor of Connecticut: Julius Catlin (Republican)
- Lieutenant Governor of Illinois: John Wood (Republican) (until March 20), vacant (starting March 20)
- Lieutenant Governor of Indiana: Abram A. Hammond (Democratic) (until October 3), vacant (starting October 3)
- Lieutenant Governor of Iowa: Oran Faville (Republican) (until January 11), Nicholas J. Rusch (Republican) (starting January 11)
- Lieutenant Governor of Kentucky: vacant
- Lieutenant Governor of Louisiana: William F. Griffin (Democratic) (until January 23), Henry M. Hyams (Democratic) (starting January 23)
- Lieutenant Governor of Massachusetts: Eliphalet Trask (Republican)
- Lieutenant Governor of Michigan: Edmund B. Fairfield (Republican)
- Lieutenant Governor of Minnesota: William Holcombe (Democratic) (until January 2), Ignatius L. Donnelly (Republican) (starting January 2)
- Lieutenant Governor of Missouri: Hancock Lee Jackson (Democratic)
- Lieutenant Governor of New York: Robert Campbell (Republican)
- Lieutenant Governor of Ohio: Martin Welker (Democratic) (until January 9), Robert C. Kirk (Republican) (starting January 9)
- Lieutenant Governor of Rhode Island: Isaac Saunders (political party unknown) (until May 29), J. Russell Bullock (political party unknown) (starting May 29)
- Lieutenant Governor of South Carolina: M. E. Carn (Democratic) (until December 14), W. W. Harllee (Democratic) (starting December 14)
- Lieutenant Governor of Texas: Edward Clark (Democratic)
- Lieutenant Governor of Vermont: Burnham Martin (Republican) (until October 12), Levi Underwood (Republican) (starting October 12)
- Lieutenant Governor of Virginia: William Lowther Jackson (Democratic) (until January 1), Robert Latane Montague (no political party) (starting January 1)
- Lieutenant Governor of Wisconsin: Erasmus D. Campbell (Democratic) (until January 2), Butler G. Noble (Republican) (starting January 2)

== Events ==
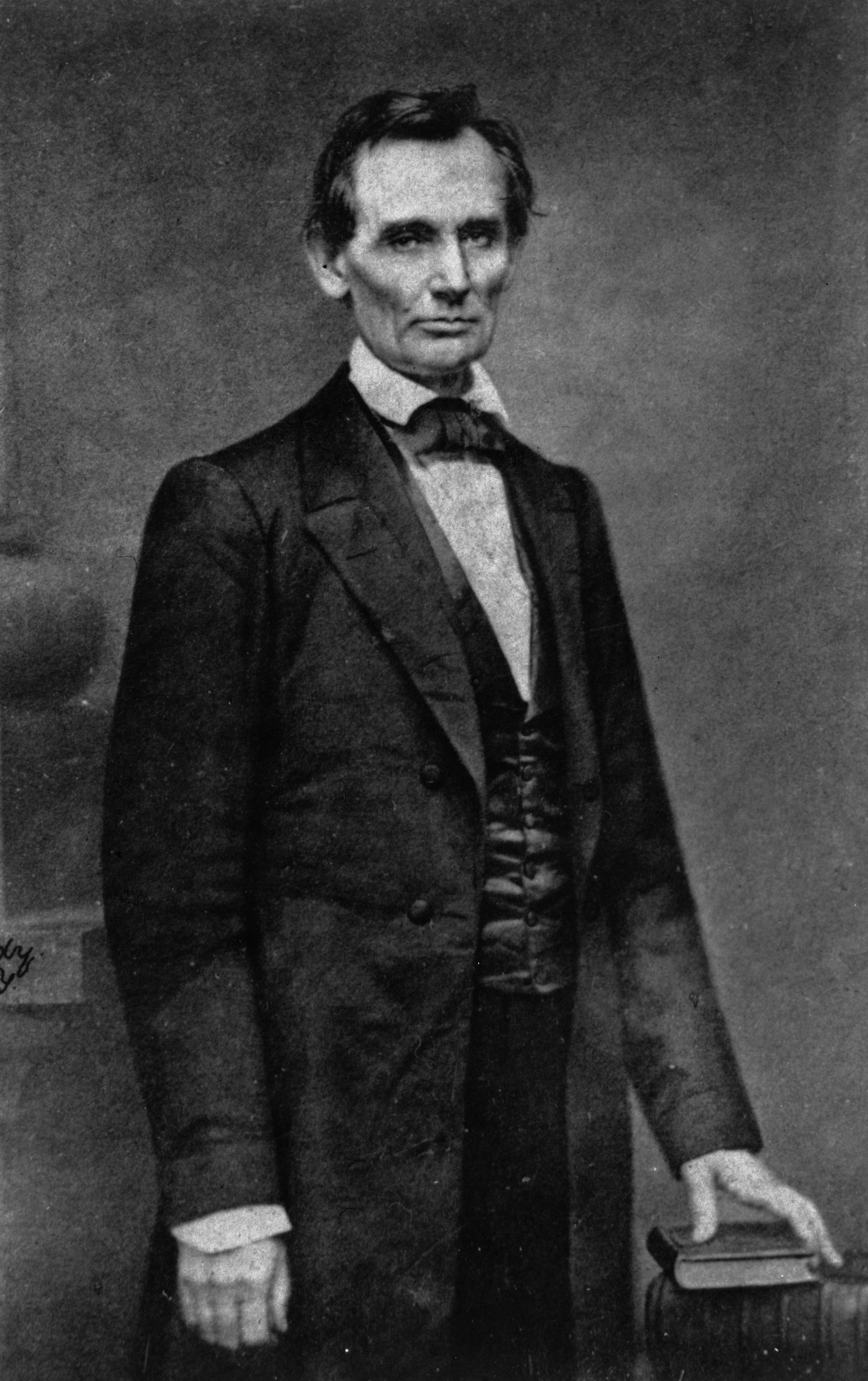
Abraham Lincoln is elected president with no support from the South

=== January–March ===
- January 10 – The Pemberton Mill collapses in Lawrence, Massachusetts, killing at least 77 workers.
- February 22 – The New England Shoemakers Strike of 1860 begins in Lynn, Massachusetts. The strike spreads throughout New England, and eventually involves 20,000 workers.
- February 27 – Abraham Lincoln gives his Cooper Union speech in New York City.
- March 6 – While campaigning for the presidency, Abraham Lincoln makes a speech defending the right to strike.
- March 9 – The first Japanese ambassadors to the United States arrive in San Francisco.

=== April–June ===
- April 3 – The Pony Express begins its first run from Saint Joseph, Missouri to Sacramento, California.
- May 1 – A Chondrite type meteorite falls to earth in Muskingum County, Ohio near the town of New Concord.
- May 6 – The Paiute War begins as Northern Paiutes raided Williams Station in Utah Territory.
- May 9 – The U.S. Constitutional Union Party holds its convention and nominates John Bell for President of the United States.
- May 12 – Paiute War – First Battle of Pyramid Lake: American vigilantes seek out the Paiutes and are soundly defeated. Disorganized and outnumbered, nearly all of the vigilantes are killed or wounded.
- May 18 – Abraham Lincoln is selected as the U.S. presidential candidate for the Republican Party.
- June 2–4 – Paiute War – Second Battle of Pyramid Lake: A well-organized force of militia and U.S. Army soldiers seek out the Paiutes and defeat them in the final battle of the war.

=== July–September ===
- July 9 – The Clotilda arrives at Mobile Bay, Alabama as the last known slave ship to bring captives from Africa to the United States.
- August – The Paiute War ends with an informal ceasefire.
- August 25 – The Stone's Prairie Riot takes place in Payson and Plainville, Illinois between the Republican Wide Awakes and armed Democratic supporters of Stephen A. Douglas.
- September 7 – The Lady Elgin is accidentally rammed and sunk in Lake Michigan; more than 400 drown.

=== October–December ===
- October 15 – 11-year-old Grace Bedell writes to Abraham Lincoln telling him to grow a beard.
- November 6 – 1860 United States presidential election: Abraham Lincoln beats John C. Breckinridge, Stephen A. Douglas, and John Bell and is elected as the 16th president of the United States, the first Republican to hold that office.
- December 18
  - Senator John J. Crittenden proposes the so-called Crittenden Compromise hoping to resolve the U.S. secession crisis.
  - Texas Rangers defeat a band of Comanches at the Battle of Pease River; Cynthia Ann Parker is recaptured and returned to her family after 24 years.
- December 20 – South Carolina becomes the first state to secede from the United States.
- December 24 – South Carolina issues the "Declaration of the Immediate Causes Which Induce and Justify the Secession of South Carolina from the Federal Union", analogous to the United States Declaration of Independence.

=== Undated ===
- Augustana College is founded in Chicago, Illinois, United States by Swedish immigrants. The college moves to Paxton, Illinois, in 1862, and to its eventual home in Rock Island, Illinois, in 1875.
- Sedalia, Missouri is incorporated.
- The American South has c. 4 million slaves.
- 1860–1900 – 14 million immigrants come to the United States.

=== Ongoing ===
- Secession crisis (1860–61)

== Births ==
- January 1 – Dan Katchongva, tribal leader and activist (died 1972)
- January 17 – Charles K. French, actor, film director, and screenwriter (died 1952)
- January 25 – Charles Curtis, 31st vice president of the United States from 1929 to 1933; U.S. Senator from Kansas from 1915 to 1929 (died 1936)
- February 28 – Carl Georg Barth, mathematician and mechanical engineer (died 1939)
- February 29 – Herman Hollerith, pioneer of automated data processing (died 1929)
- March 2 – Susanna M. Salter, first woman mayor in the U.S. (died 1961)
- March 5 – Sam Thompson, baseball player (died 1922)
- March 8 – James A. Hemenway, U.S. Senator from Indiana from 1905 to 1909 (died 1923)
- March 11 – Thomas Hastings, architect (died 1929)
- March 19 – William Jennings Bryan, politician (died 1925)
- March 27 – Frank Frost Abbott, classical scholar (died 1924)
- April 7 – Will Keith Kellogg, industrialist, founder of the Kellogg Company (died 1951)
- May 15 – Ellen Axson Wilson, First Lady of the United States from 1913 to 1914 as wife of Woodrow Wilson (died 1914)
- May 16 – Herman Webster Mudgett, serial killer (d. 1896)
- June 22 – Tom O'Brien, baseball player (died 1921)
- July 3 – Charlotte Perkins Gilman, feminist novelist (died 1935)
- July 4 – Idah McGlone Gibson, journalist (died 1933)
- July 14 – Owen Wister, Western fiction writer and historian (died 1938)
- July 19 – Lizzie Borden, murder suspect (died 1927)
- August 8 – Eliza Putnam Heaton, journalist and editor (died 1919)
- August 9 – Maude Gillette Phillips, author and educator (d. unknown)
- August 13 – Annie Oakley, West show performer (died 1926)
- August 15
  - Henrietta Vinton Davis, elocutionist, dramatist and impersonator (died 1941)
  - Florence Harding, née Kling, First Lady of the United States from 1921 to 1923 as wife of Warren G. Harding (died 1924)
- September 5 – Andrew Volstead, politician (died 1947)
- September 6 – Jane Addams, social worker, recipient of the Nobel Peace Prize in 1931 (died 1935)
- September 7 – "Grandma Moses", born Anna Mary Robertson, folk painter (died 1961)
- September 13 – John J. Pershing, general (died 1948)
- October – William Edward White, African American baseball player (died 1937)
- October 12 – Chester I. Long, U.S. Senator from Kansas from 1903 to 1909 (died 1934)
- October 23 – Molly Elliot Seawell, historian (died 1916)
- October 31 – Juliette Gordon Low, founder of Girl Scouts (died 1927)
- November 2 – Soapy Smith, con artist and gangster (shot 1898)
- December 4 – Lillian Russell, singer and actress (died 1922)
- December 15 – Abner Powell, Major league baseball player (died 1953)
- December 18 – Edward MacDowell, pianist and composer (died 1908)
- December 28 – Harry B. Smith, songwriter (died 1936)
- December 31
  - Joseph S. Cullinan, industrialist, founder of Texaco (died 1937)
  - John T. Thompson, U.S. Army officer, inventor of the Thompson submachine gun (died 1940)

== Deaths ==
- January 5 – John Neumann, first United States bishop to be canonized (born 1811)
- January 13 – William Mason, politician (born 1786)
- January 18 – John Nelson, lawyer (born 1791)
- February 25 – Chauncey Allen Goodrich, lexicographer (born 1790)
- April 6 – James Kirke Paulding, writer and United States Secretary of the Navy (born 1778)
- May 9 – Samuel Griswold Goodrich (Peter Parley), children's author (born 1793)
- May 10 – Theodore Parker, preacher, Transcendentalist and abolitionist (born 1810)
- May 21 – Phineas Gage, improbable head injury survivor (born 1823)
- May 31 – Peter Vivian Daniel, Associate Justice of the Supreme Court from 1841 to 1860 (born 1784)
- June 6 – Henry P. Haun, U.S. Senator from California from 1859 to 1860 (born 1815)
- July 1 – Charles Goodyear, inventor (born 1800)
- September 12 – William Walker, filibuster, briefly President of Nicaragua, executed (born 1824)
- September 19 – Thomas D. Rice, actor and dancer (born 1808)
- September 29 – Chapin A. Harris, physician and dentist (born 1806)
- October 3 – Rembrandt Peale, portrait painter and museum keeper (born 1778)
- October 25 – James "Grizzly" Adams, mountain man and bear trainer (born 1812)

== See also ==
- Timeline of United States history (1860–1899)
