= Williams Station massacre =

1860 incident in Nevada, United States

- Location: 39°27′09.3″N 119°04′10.7″W; Silver Springs, Nevada
- Date: May 7, 1860
- Deaths: 5 killed
- Perpetrator: Paiutes

The Williams Station massacre was an incident that ignited the Pyramid Lake War of 1860.

Williams Station was a combination saloon, general store, stagecoach and Pony Express station located along the Carson River at the modern-day Lahontan Reservoir. On May 6, 1860, Williams Station was raided by Paiutes while its owner was away. There are conflicting versions as to why an Indian war party killed all the white men and burned Williams Station. Sarah Winnemucca wrote that two Paiute children were kidnapped by the Williams brothers and that when the children were discovered, the Paiutes killed the two brothers after they had molested two sisters that were the age of 12. Another source states that the Paiutes were upset at the encroachment of the whites and that they decided to ally with a large Shoshone band and massacre all the whites.

When James O. Williams returned he found his two brothers' bodies mutilated and tortured, as well as three other patrons of the saloon murdered. The Sacramento Daily Union stated that Williams stated that twelve or thirteen other nearby settlers had been murdered. However, the Union also stated that Williams was pursued by five hundred Indians, which turns out not to be true, so the report in the Union is not necessarily accurate. Other than the report in the Union, there are no contemporary reports of the 12–13 additional dead.

The Pony Express Station at Cold Springs was raided by Indians a few days later (between May 9 and 13), killing the station keeper, burning the station and running off all the stock.

The deaths of the white settlers led to great panic with nearby Virginia City, Nevada. A local militia force was quickly assembled under the leadership of William Ormsby. Ormsby was defeated at the first Battle of Pyramid Lake which in turn led to a second, more sizeable, force led by John C. Hays to be assembled. Hays' force returned to the site of Williams Station and won a small victory there before being united with U.S. Regular Army forces under Joseph Stewart.

The site of the Williams Station massacre has been submerged beneath Lahontan Reservoir since 1905.
