= Numaga =

Paiute leader

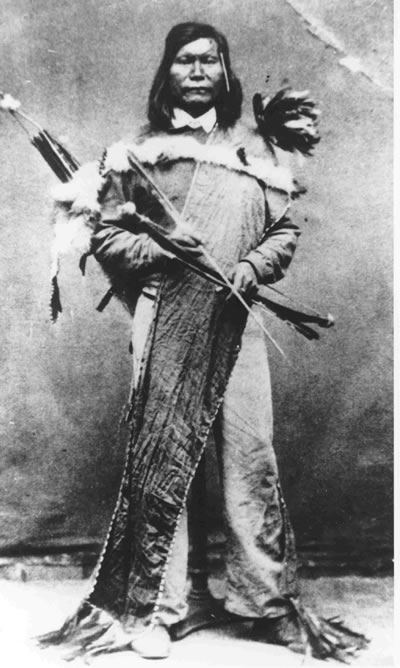
- Numaga
- Born: circa 1830
- Died: November 5, 1871 (aged 40–41)
- Occupation: Indian leader
- Known for: Pyramid Lake War

Numaga (c. 1830 – November 5, 1871) was a Paiute leader during the Paiute War of 1860 that centered on Pyramid Lake in what is now Nevada in the United States. The war was caused by an influx of miners and ranchers after silver was discovered in the Comstock Lode near to Carson City. The newcomers assaulted the Paiutes and destroyed their foods supplies. When the Paiutes responded, the U.S. Army used force to suppress them. Both before and after the war, Numaga was a strong advocate of peace and did much to reduce the violence on both sides. He died of tuberculosis, a "white man's disease", in 1871.

== Origins ==
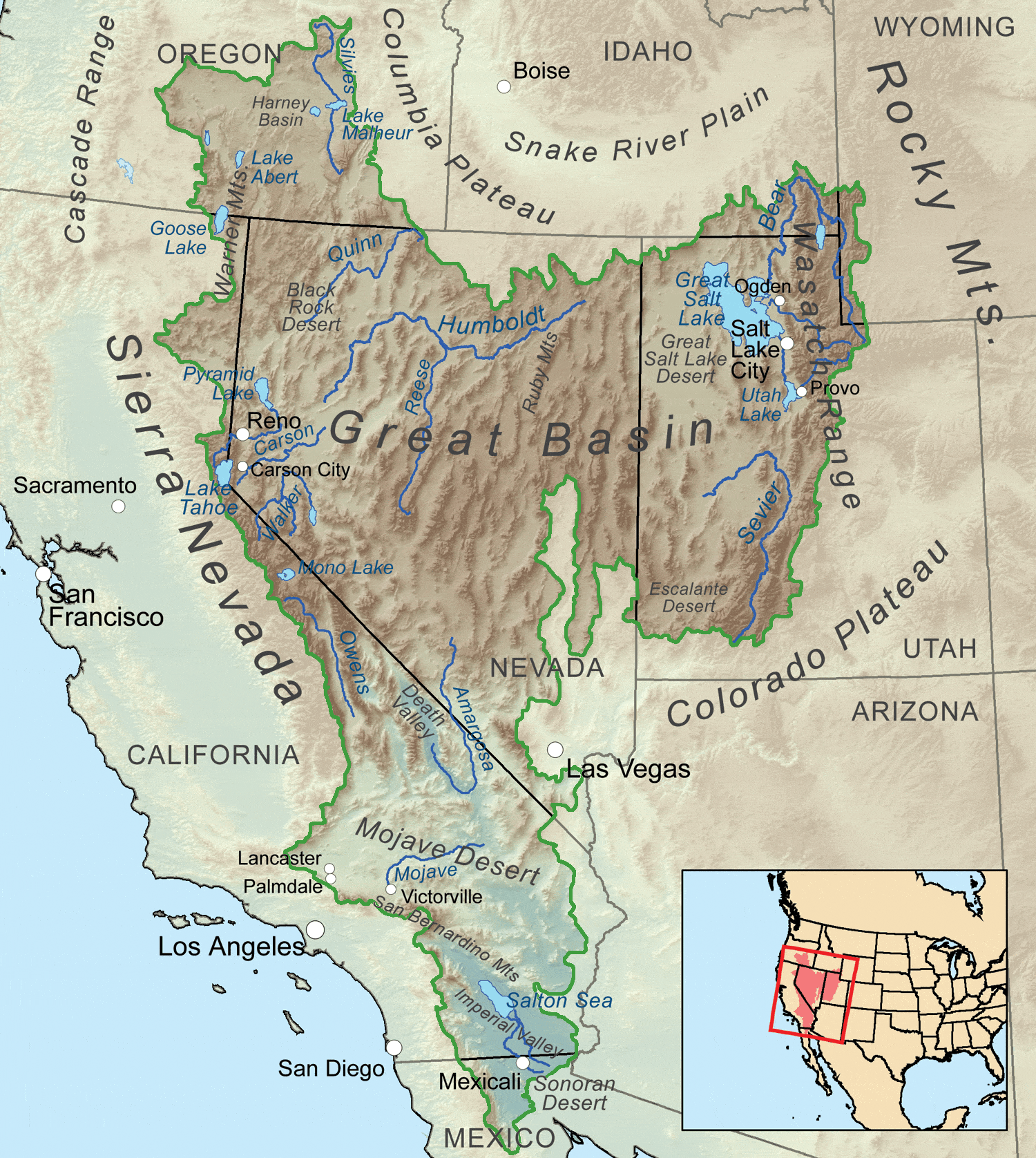
The Great Basin, the traditional territory of the Paiute. Pyramid Lake is to the north of Carson City in Western Nevada.

The Paiute traditionally followed a hunting and gathering lifestyle in the Great Basin region that covers most of modern-day Nevada and western Utah, extending north into Oregon and bounded on the west by the Sierra Nevada in California. Temperatures range from extreme heat in the summer to bitter cold in the winter. The land is semi-arid, with vegetation ranging from dense coniferous forests on the mountains surrounding the basin to thinner woodlands lower down, giving way to grasslands and then to bunch grass, sagebrush, and scrub on the basin floor, with barren areas of gravel or alkali flats.

The Paiutes had no central government but lived in bands of around a hundred people who would occupy a territory of about 50 to 100 square miles (130 to 260 km^{2}). The Paiute migrated with the seasons, living in temporary huts built of willow poles covered with brush and reeds. They lived on shoots and roots, fruit, fish, ducks, lizards, grubs, and insects. In fall, pine nuts from the piñon trees in the hills were an essential foodstuff. In winter the Paiute hunted game in the lowlands, particularly rabbits.

Numaga (Note: The name "Numaga" means "giver of food", indicating that the holder of the name is a generous man) was born sometime around 1830. He was said by some to be the son of Chief Winnemucca (also called Po-i-to) and brother of Sarah Winnemucca. Sarah Winnemucca wrote that he was her cousin. Another source says he was no relative of Poito, and the two were never friendly. Numaga was called "Young Winnemucca" by the whites, or sometimes just "Winnemucca". Numaga was at least six feet tall, a man of great physical strength with a quiet dignity which gave him an air of superiority. A soldier who saw him in August 1860 said, "In appearance he is all that romance could desire, deep-chested and strong-limbed, with a watchful, earnest expression of countenance, indicative of graver thought and study [than is] common to the aboriginal race."

Early contacts between the Paiutes and white fur trappers and traders were friendly, but the Northern Paiute became more hostile after the California gold rush began in 1848 and brought large numbers of miners and immigrants into their lands. Numaga picked up English while working for several seasons as a field hand for the Mission Fathers in the Santa Clara Valley of California. Through his evident sincerity, intellect, eloquence and courage Numaga gained considerable stature among the Paiute, and was viewed by the whites as their leader, although he did not have this official standing.

== Causes of conflict ==
In 1859, the news broke that silver had been found in the huge Comstock Lode in Washoe, a region that was then in the western part of Utah Territory, and that would soon become the territory of Nevada. Hordes of miners flooded to the mining center of Virginia City, near to Carson City. They cut down pinyon trees to make fuel for ore-processing, destroying the pine-nut "orchards" that were essential to the Paiute food economy. Hunters and trappers took big game, fish and waterfowl to feed the miners. Ranchers moved into the fertile valleys, cutting off access to places where nuts, roots and seeds could be gathered.

In the late fall of 1859, two miners were killed in the mountains and were found with arrows in their bodies. Their money had been stolen but not their clothing or supplies, making it questionable whether Indians were responsible since the indigenous people did not yet have a money economy. Major William Ormsby asked for help in finding the culprits from Chief Winnemucca (Poito). He was friendly with Poito, whose daughter Sarah (Note: Sarah Winnemucca was to become a prominent Native American activist and educator, and an influential figure in the United States' nineteenth-century Indian policies.) and her younger sister were staying in his house to be educated in English and in reading and writing. Two days later, one hundred Paiute warriors swathed in rabbit-skin clothing rode into Carson City, led by Chief Natchez and Chief Numaga. Natchez, son of Chief Winnemucca, was the peace-chief at that time and Numaga was the war-chief. Numaga agreed to help. He sent five men to the camp of the Washoe leader Captain Jim to ask him to give up the guilty men, since the arrows had been made by Washoes. Eventually, under protest, Captain Jim sent two men to stand trial in order to avoid reprisals on his people. They were shot dead in Numaga's presence by a mob of angry whites.

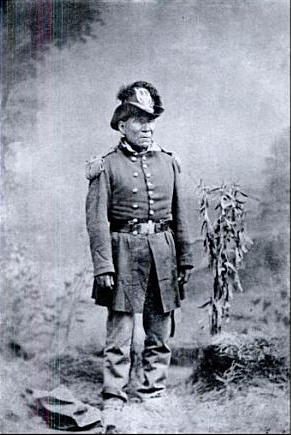
Chief Winnemucca (Poito), of the Northern Paiutes, dressed in army uniform

The indigenous people of the region, including the Paiutes and Washoes, were threatened by starvation in the winter of 1859–1860. There were growing numbers of fights between whites and Indians. The Paiutes gathered at Pyramid Lake towards the end of April 1860 for a conference on how to deal with the encroachments of the white men. Most of the leaders spoke out for war. Winnemucca (Poito), the most senior leader at the assembly, appeared to be in favor of war but refrained from taking a public position.

Myron Angel, in his 1881 History of Nevada, said that Numaga was the only chief who spoke in favor of peace. From his experience with the whites in California, Numaga was more aware of their resources than most of his audience. He agreed that the white men had greatly wronged the Indians, but pointed out that the whites would be bound to win any war. He argued that a peaceful course would be wiser, letting the Indians keep their ancestral lands. (Note: In his 1881 history, Myron Angel gave a reconstruction of Numaga's speech that may reveal as much about Angel as it does about Numaga: You would make war upon the whites; I ask you to pause and reflect. The white men are like the stars over your heads. You have wrongs, great wrongs, that rise up like those mountains before you; but can you, from the mountain tops, reach and blot out those stars ? Your enemies are like the sands in the bed of your rivers; when taken away they only give place for more to come and settle there. Could you defeat the whites in Nevada, from over the mountains in California would come to help them an army of white men that would cover your country like a blanket. What hope is there for the Pah-Ute? From where is to come your guns, your powder, your lead, your dried meats to live upon, and hay to feed your ponies with while you carry on this war. Your enemies have all of these things, more than they can use. They will come like the sand in a whirlwind and drive you from your homes. You will be forced among the barren rocks of the north, where your ponies will die; where you will see the women and old men starve, and listen to the cries of your children for food. I love my people; let them live; and when their spirits shall be called to the great Camp in the southern sky, let their bones rest where their fathers were buried.) While Numaga was speaking, a group of Indians arrived and brought news of an incident that had just happened at Williams Station. After hearing what had taken place, Numaga said, "There is no longer any use for counsel; we must prepare for war, for the soldiers will now come here to fight us."

== War ==
The tipping point came on May 12, 1860. Five employees of Williams Station, a Pony Express post on the Carson River, captured and raped two Northern Paiute women. A band of Northern Paiutes attacked the post, killed the men and freed the women. Major William Ormsby collected a force of 105 volunteers from Virginia City who went out to bury the dead white men, and then punish the Paiutes at Pyramid Lake. The Paiutes led by Numaga lured this force into a dangerous position. The volunteers were poorly armed with handguns against the Indians' long-range rifles, and were outmaneuvered in what turned from a confident advance into a desperate defense. Most of the whites were killed, including Ormsby, in what is now known as the Battle of Pyramid Lake. In all, seventy-six of Ormsby's volunteers died and most of the rest were wounded, saved only by the coming of nightfall. The defeat by the despised Indians had a devastating effect on white morale.

An army officer arriving in the region just after the battle found a scene of chaos and some panic, with trains of people returning to California to avoid the Indians. Volunteers were armed and mustered to counter the danger from an estimated 15,000 well-armed and well-mounted "Pah Utes, Shishones and Pitt River Indians." Since the Indians had assembled at Pyramid Lake there had been "daily news of massacres by the red villains." Colonel Jack Hays, a former Texas Ranger, was given command of the United States forces. Hays mustered a force of over 750 soldiers and volunteers, who set out from California on June 2, 1860.

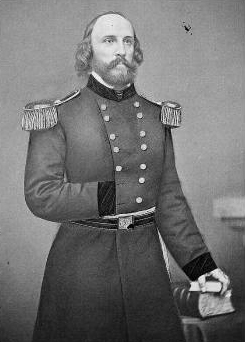
Frederick W. Lander, who negotiated peace with Numaga

Hays fought the Paiutes in two skirmishes near Pyramid Lake. Neither was decisive, but the Indians sustained sufficient injuries to destroy Numaga's loosely coordinated command structure. The bands dispersed into the Black Rock and Smoke Creek deserts and the surrounding hills. Some travelled further into Oregon, Idaho and Washington Territory. The war petered out. U.S. troops built a temporary fort near Pyramid Lake, then moved to the more permanent Fort Churchill, which guarded the wagon trail from the east. One man was killed in a U.S. scouting expedition around Pyramid Lake. There was a minor skirmish with a group of soldiers under Frederick W. Lander, an Army engineer. Lander was establishing watering holes and building a wagon road through the Black Rock Desert. To him, the Indian hostilities were a distraction from the job at hand, and he initiated a truce with Numaga that turned into a lasting peace.

== Peace negotiations ==
Lander's assistant commissary agent captured five Northern Paiute near the Humboldt River. He released two of them in exchange for a promise that they would return with their leader, Naanah. Lander and Naanah met on August 12, and they agreed that Naanah would bring Numaga to a meeting at a place called Deep Hole Springs, Nevada. On August 21, 1860, Numaga met with Lander at the agreed location, and after eating food prepared by Lander's men the two men smoked for a while. Lander opened the negotiation by saying he could relay Numaga's grievances to the "Great Father" in Washington, but could make no promises.

Numaga said he was pleased to hear no promises, because the whites had never kept any promises they had made in the past. He said he could not guarantee being able to prevent attacks by roaming bands of Paiutes, any more than the "Great Father" had shown he was able to prevent whites from killing Indians. He said that the violence was due to the hostile attitude of whites, who had ravaged Paiute women and killed their men without cause. He disclaimed responsibility for the Williams Station incident, which he blamed on a group of Bannocks over whom he had no authority. However, he said that if the whites had come to him afterwards to discuss the problem, as had been agreed by treaty, there would have been no need for fighting.

Lander asked Numaga to try to restrain the Paiutes from hostilities for a year, and he would try to arrange a treaty under which they would retain possession of the lands they held and regain possession or be paid for lands that had been seized from them. Numaga accepted this. He said he would try to bring Poito to meet with Frederick Dodge, the Indian agent, to arrange a formal truce.

== Later years ==
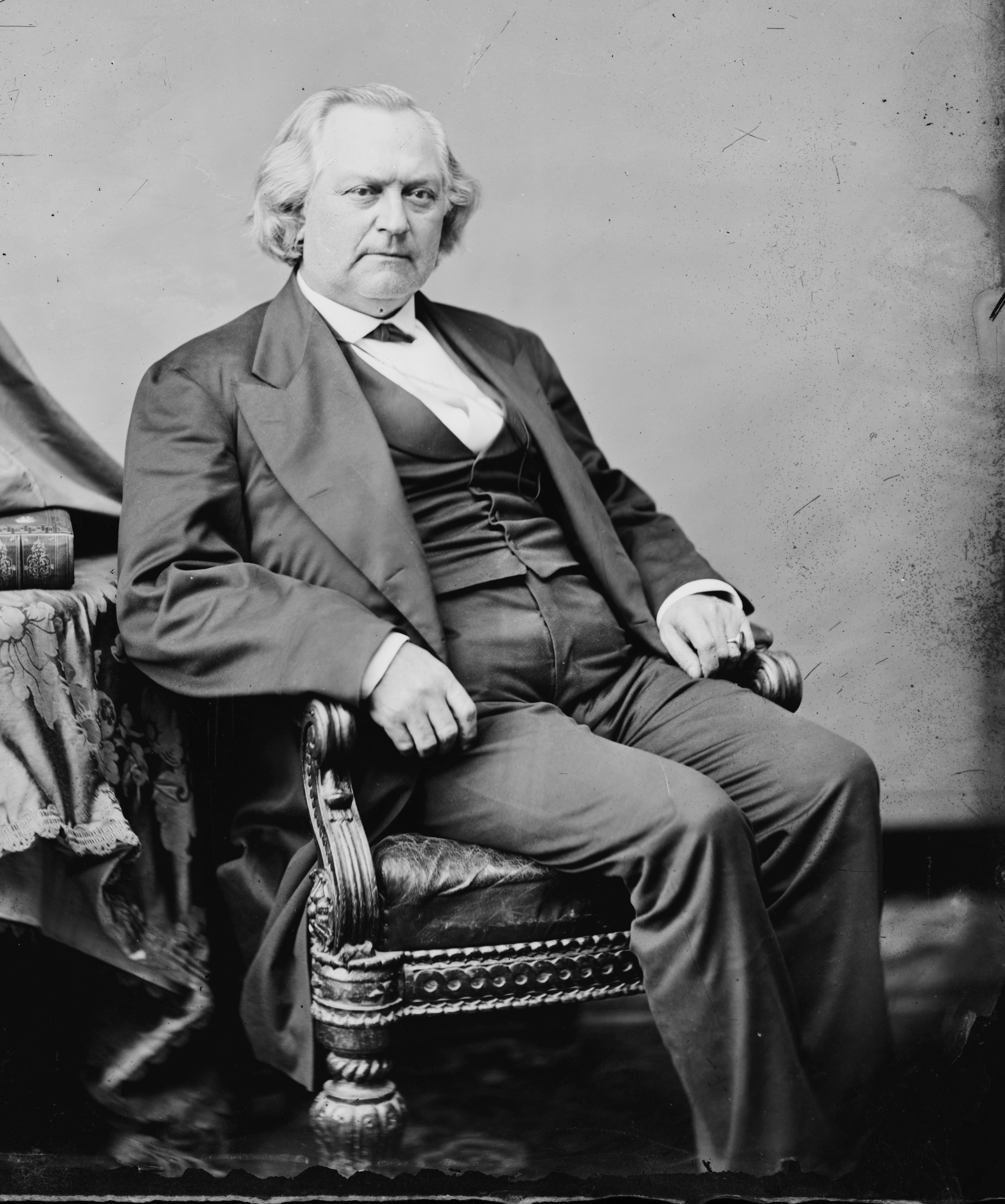
James W. Nye, first Governor of Nevada

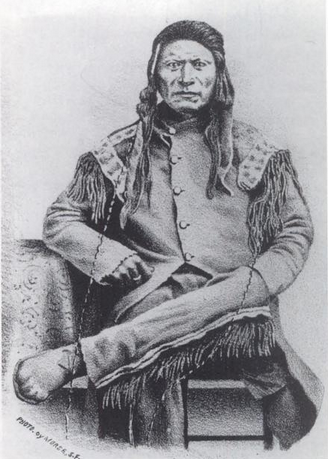
Numaga in the 1860s

The informal treaty between Numaga and Lander was effective. In 1862, Winnemucca (Poito) and four hundred warriors in full regalia gave a ceremonial welcome at Pyramid Lake to James W. Nye, the first governor of the newly created Nevada Territory. Although intermittent fighting continued in later years, Numaga and Poito did not participate.

In 1863 Numaga came to the town of Como, near Virginia City, to issue a formal complaint against the destruction of pine-nut trees. He explained that the "pine-nut groves were the Indian's orchards", and they depended on them for food. The whites could collect fallen timber, but must not cut down the trees. Numaga was ignored. Later in the day, some unknown Indians arrived in town, causing rumors that hostiles were gathering and preparing to attack. With mounting tension, two citizens met at dusk,

both forgot the password, and 'turned loose' in the most approved style with their revolvers, each supposing he was having a struggle for life with, possibly, Numaga himself. The alarm was general and fearful to contemplate. A butcher, in his hurry to rush to the general defense from midnight massacre of the town, in his haste to get hold of it, accidentally fired off his gun, and then, as the aforesaid Alf. Doten, without the fear of God before his eyes, remarked, "Hell did pop." The next morning the Indians came into town to see what all the row was about.

In March 1865 two white men were killed on Walker River by Indians whom they had mistreated, and later two more white men were killed in separate incidents. Settlers were alarmed. The Gold Hill News recommended a "final solution of the great Indian problem: by exterminating the whole race, or driving them forever beyond our frontier." A contingent of troops under a young and inexperienced leader was dispatched from Fort Churchill. They heard of an encampment of cattle thieves beside Mud Lake, also called Winnemucca Lake, near to Pyramid Lake. Before dawn on March 14, 1865, the contingent opened fire on the Paiute camp. Twenty-nine Paiutes were killed, with the troops suffering one minor injury. At first, the Battle of Mud Lake was applauded in the press, although doubts were later raised about the lack of army injuries.

In an effort to prevent escalating violence, Governor Henry G. Blasdel requested a conference at Fort Churchill with the Paiute chiefs. Numaga reported what had actually happened. There had been cattle thieves in the camp, but they had left before the soldiers arrived. Apart from three or four men, there had only been women and children in the camp, including Poito's wives, who had been killed. Some women had jumped in the water to escape. Those who had not drowned had been shot. Numaga said the violence could easily have been avoided. If the whites had asked him, he would have delivered the cattle thieves to them.

The Virginia City Daily Union reported on the council. Captain Wells, the army leader, had said his men had killed Smoke Creek Indians in a "stubborn and sanguinary" fight between equal forces. He had then destroyed the Indians' arms. He made no mention of any women being killed. There were many discrepancies between this report and the testimony of Numaga, who was highly respected by the whites. The reporter questioned why Wells had destroyed the arms, which would have made valuable trophies of the battle, but said "his command did bring in some trophies of that battle". He quoted from an article in the Territorial Enterprise:

INDIAN SCALPS,–Notwithstanding orders to the contrary, it is said that Capt. Wells' men (Company D), who were in the fight at Mud Lake, took fourteen or fifteen scalps. One of the men claims to have the scalp of the Notorious Smoke Creek Sam...

In the period between 1864 and 1868 there was ongoing violence between miners and settlers and the "Snake Indians", bands of Northern Paiutes, Bannocks and Shoshones in the Snake River and Owyhee River valleys of southern Idaho and Eastern Oregon. The hostilities are sometimes called the Snake War. An army expedition in May 1866 was ineffective and Indians raids, thefts and killings continued. Around June 20, 1866, General Henry Halleck, commander of the Military Division of the Pacific, arrived at Fort Churchill with a large entourage. He was visited by many Paiutes from the Truckee and Walker River reservations. Numaga was the main speaker, professing friendship for the whites but presenting the Indian grievances. The warriors who had accompanied Numaga put on an impressive display of horsemanship. Numaga said that he would take all the Indian prisoners whom Halleck had captured back to the Truckee Reservation, where he would keep watch on them. The Indians received a supply of rations.

Numaga died of tuberculosis on November 5, 1871, near Wadsworth, Nevada.

== Sources ==
- Angel, Myron (1881). History of Nevada. Oakland, California: Thompson and West.
- Cox, Joyce M. (30 May 2011). Washoe County. Arcadia Publishing. ISBN 978-0-7385-8168-2.
- Dinkelspiel, Frances (2010-01-05). Towers of Gold: How One Jewish Immigrant Named Isaias Hellman Created California. Macmillan. ISBN 978-0-312-35527-2.
- Ecelbarger, Gary L. (2000). Frederick W. Lander: The Great Natural American Soldier. Louisiana State University Press. p. 69. ISBN 978-0-8071-2580-9.
- Egan, Ferol (1985-01-01). Sand In A Whirlwind, 30Th Anniversary Edition: The Paiute Indian War Of 1860. University of Nevada Press. ISBN 978-0-87417-097-9.
- Ford, Victoria (2012). "Sarah Winnemucca". Nevada Women's History Project. Archived from the original on 2012-09-14.
- Forde, Cyril Daryll (1963). Habitat, Economy and Society: A Geographical Introduction to Ethnology. Taylor & Francis. GGKEY:5N2HZBBQ693.
- Gibson, Elizabeth (2010-07-13). It Happened In Nevada, 2nd: Remarkable Events that Shaped History. Globe Pequot. ISBN 978-0-7627-5871-5.
- James, Ronald M (1998-09-01). The Roar And The Silence: A History Of Virginia City And The Comstock Lode. University of Nevada Press. ISBN 978-0-87417-320-8.
- Knack, Martha C. (1999-08-01). As Long As The River Shall Run: An Ethnohistory Of Pyramid Lake Indian Reservation. University of Nevada Press. p. 72. ISBN 978-0-87417-334-5.
- Michno, Gregory (2007-06-01). The Deadliest Indian War in the West: The Snake Conflict, 1864–1868. Caxton Press. ISBN 978-0-87004-460-1.
- Reid, John B.; James, Ronald M. (2004-04-01). Uncovering Nevada'S Past: A Primary Source History Of The Silver State. University of Nevada Press. ISBN 978-0-87417-567-7.
- Time-Life Books (1995-01-01). Indians of the Western range. Time-Life Books. ISBN 978-0-8094-9725-6.
- Waldman, Carl (2009-01-01). Encyclopedia of Native American Tribes. Infobase Publishing. ISBN 978-1-4381-1010-3.
- Wheeler, Sessions S. (1971-08-01). The Nevada Desert. Caxton Press. ISBN 978-0-87004-205-8.
- Winnemucca Hopkins, Sarah (1883). Life Among the Piutes: Their Wrongs and Claims. Cupples, Upham & Company, G. P. Putnam's sons, New York, and by the author. p. 60.
- Zanjani, Sally (2004-09-01). Sarah Winnemucca. U of Nebraska Press. ISBN 978-0-8032-9921-4.
