= Sand Springs =

Sand Springs or Sand Spring can be:

== Places ==
- Sand Spring, Maryland
- Sand Springs, Montana
- Sand Springs, Oklahoma
- Sand Springs, Texas

== Other ==
- Sand Springs Range, a mountain range located in western Nevada
- Sand Spring Run, a stream in Pennsylvania
- Sand Springs Railway, a class III railroad operating in Oklahoma
- Sand Springs Station, a Pony Express station near Sand Mountain, Nevada
- Fort Churchill and Sand Springs Toll Road
