= Second Battle of Pyramid Lake =

Final battle in the Pyramid Lake War of 1860

Coordinates: 39.74387°N 119.3278°W

- Part of Pyramid Lake War
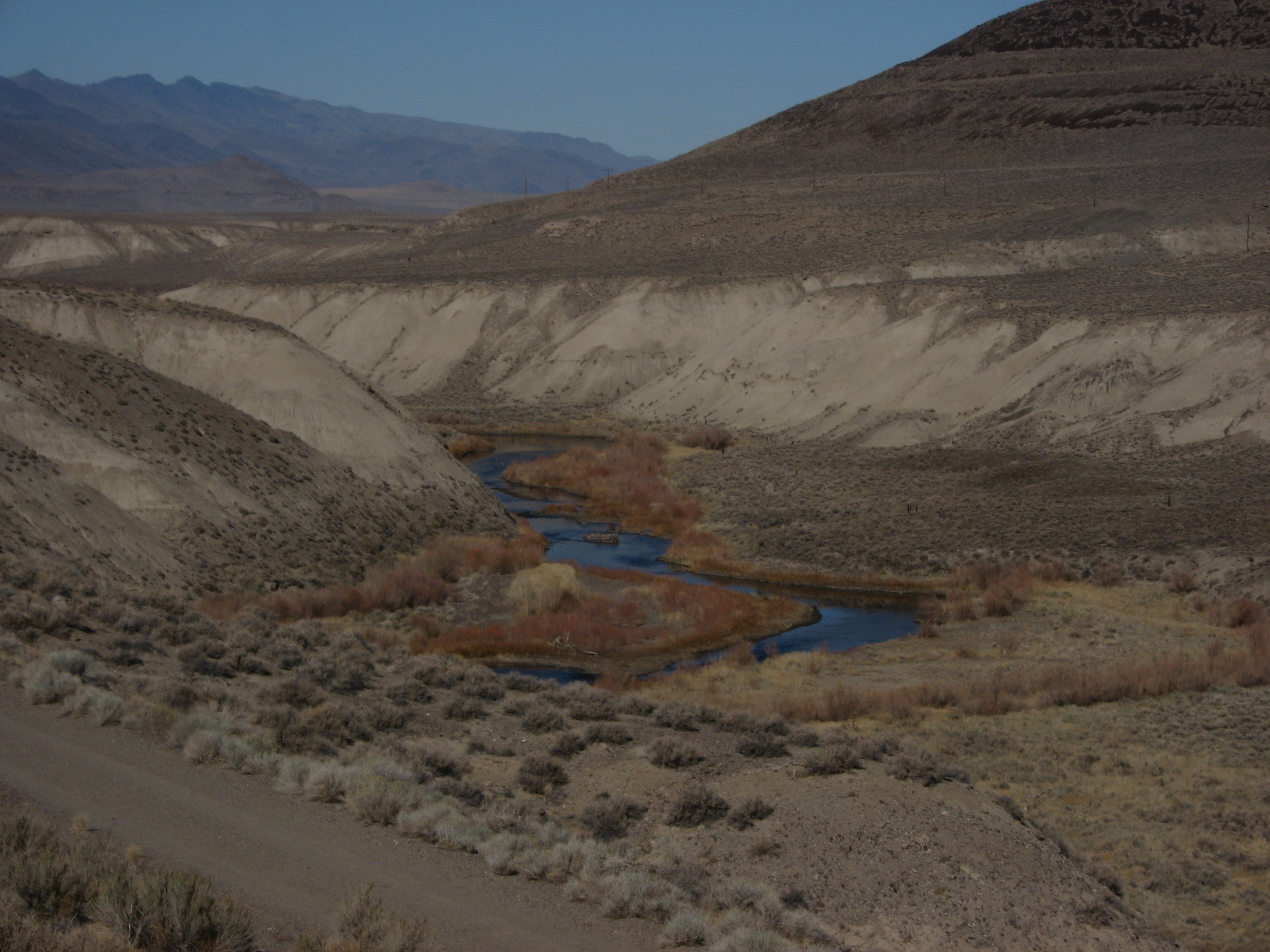
- Truckee River Gorge, site of the battle
Date	June 2–4, 1860
Location	Pyramid Lake, Nevada
Result	U.S. victory

Belligerents
United States	Paiute

Commanders and leaders
John C. Hays; Joseph Stewart	Numaga

Strength
544 volunteers "Washoe Regiment"; 207 Regulars; 6th U.S. Infantry; 3rd U.S. Artillery	300 Paiute warriors

Casualties and losses
3 killed 5 wounded	25 killed about 20 wounded

The Second Battle of Pyramid Lake (also known as the Battle of Truckee River) took place in response to the U.S. defeat at the First Battle of Pyramid Lake. A force of militia and regulars under the leadership of Texas Ranger Col. John C. "Jack" Hays defeated the Paiute warriors under Chief Numaga. This was the final engagement of the Pyramid Lake War of 1860.

== Background ==
On May 6, 1860, a band of Paiutes raided Williams Station along the Carson River, near present-day Silver Springs, Nevada, killing three white settlers at the station. In response, Major William Ormsby led a group of vigilantes from Carson City and Virginia City against the Paiutes near Pyramid Lake. The vigilante force was defeated and Ormsby was killed. This defeat prompted local settlers to send a call for help to nearby California.

== Prelude ==
Colonel John C. Hays responded to the call and traveled to Carson City to organize a regiment of 500 volunteers, whom he dubbed the "Washoe Regiment". Another 165 volunteers came from the nearby California communities of Placerville, Sacramento, Nevada City and Downieville. Hays then marched his regiment to Virginia City.

The U.S. Army also responded to the call. Captain Joseph Stewart left Fort Alcatraz with 144 Regulars from the 3rd U.S. Artillery and 6th U.S. Infantry regiments. Stewart arrived in Carson City to await further developments. In the meantime, Hays had marched out of Virginia City to Williams Station, where he skirmished with 150 Paiutes before the warriors retreated to their village at Pyramid Lake near the mouth of the Truckee River. They sent their women and children into the Black Rock Desert as a protective measure.

== Battle ==
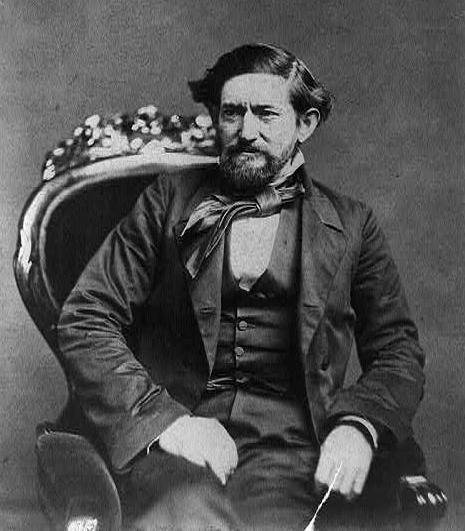
Colonel "Jack" Hays led the volunteer forces.

Colonel Hays retraced Ormsby's path along the Truckee River and encamped near present-day Wadsworth. There, Captain Stewart and his volunteers joined Colonel Hays under his command.

On June 2, the battle began when Hays sent an advance party of two companies out toward the Paiute village while the main force moved eight miles downriver from their camp, using much more caution than Ormsby had. The advance party encountered the unburied remains of Ormsby's soldiers at the previous battle site. The Paiutes then rapidly advanced in wedge formation upon the soldiers who made a hasty withdrawal.

Colonel Hays selected a narrow canyon about a mile wide as the spot to make a stand. At its west were the steep mountains of the Virginia Range. To the east ran the Truckee River. Both geographical features prevented any flanking maneuver by the natives. A rocky butte lay in the center of the field. To the west of this butte, rain had cut lateral gullies into the sandy ground, providing natural breastworks, which either side could have used to make successive stands if forced to retreat.

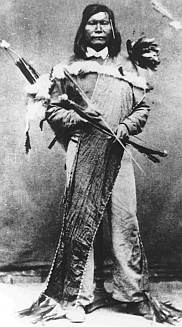
Numaga was the Paiute high chief.

The Paiute charge had taken possession of the butte and they now extended their own line from the river well into the rocks of the mountains to the west. The Paiutes had advanced and held all the geographical features advantageous to the fight and the soldiers were forced to deploy on level ground to the south. Captain Stewart ordered his regulars into a skirmish line to the west of the butte along the base of the mountains, while the volunteers formed to the east along the river.

Captain Edward Farris Storey and Captain J. B. Van Hagan, commanding two companies of volunteers from Virginia City and California, respectively, decided to make a charge against the butte even before Hays got the entire main force in place. Storey and Van Hagan succeeded in seizing the butte and for a short time were subjected to flanking fire as the natives began to surround them from the river bank and mountain slopes. This forward position was relieved as Hays advanced the main body forward. Stewart drove the warriors from the mountain slopes while Hays and the volunteers steadily advanced along the river. Eventually, the two sides maintained a continuous line of battle opposing each other roughly a mile long.

The battle continued for some time, with neither side gaining a clear advantage. After fighting for nearly three hours, the Paiutes finally retreated up the canyon toward the lake.

On June 4, Captain Stewart took up pursuit of the natives coming upon the abandoned village at the mouth of the Truckee River. Colonel Hays followed Stewart northward in pursuit. On June 5, Hays sent a group of scouts through a canyon northeast of Pyramid Lake. These scouts were ambushed and Private William Allen was killed. He was the last casualty of the war.

== Aftermath ==
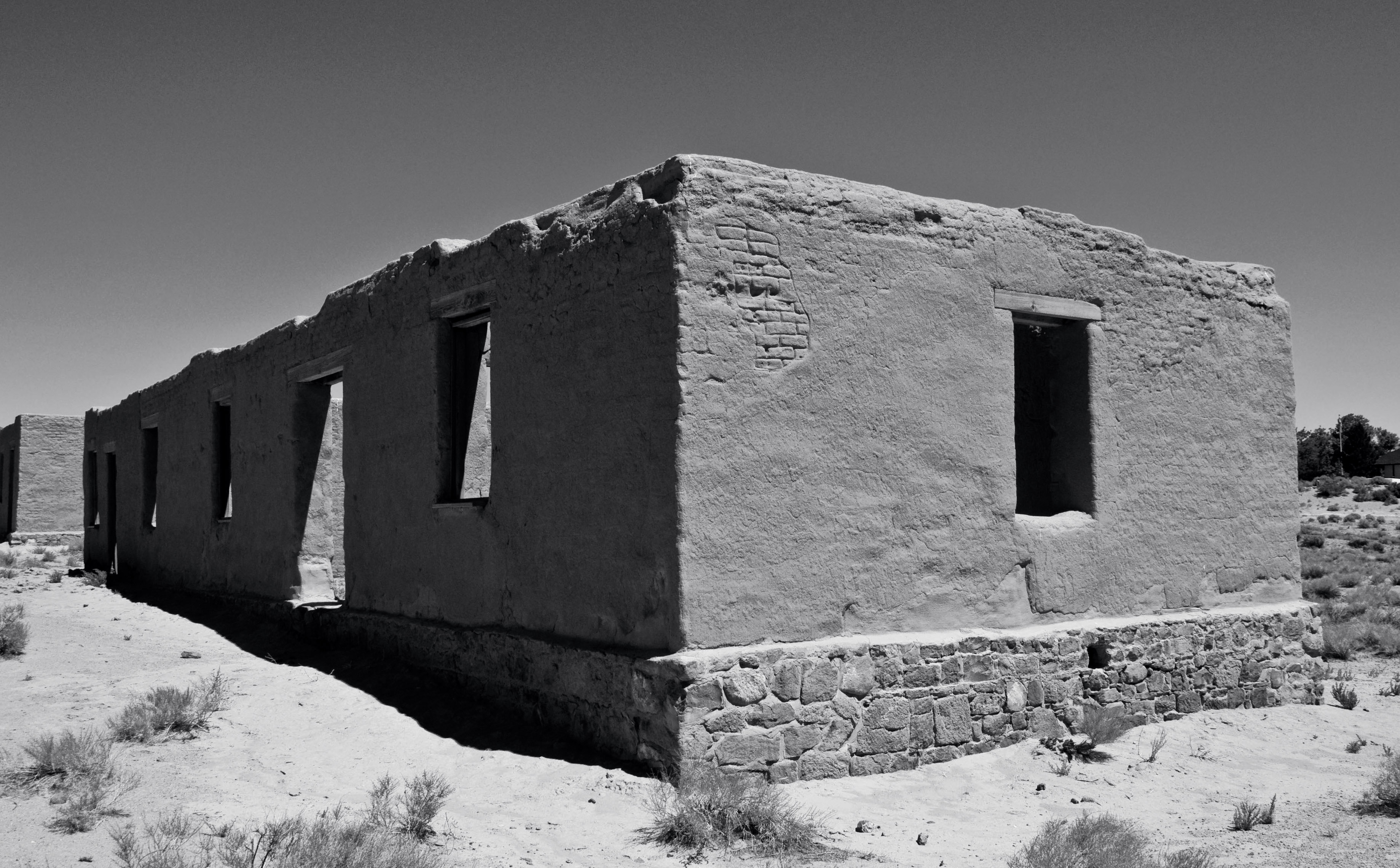
Fort Churchill was built in the aftermath of the battle.

Shortly after Allen's death, Colonel Hays returned with the Washoe Regiment to Carson City, where he disbanded the regiment. Major Ormsby's body was temporarily interred where it lay near Pyramid Lake, but was later moved to a cemetery in Carson City. Captain Storey, who was mortally wounded in the battle, was buried in Virginia City. Both Ormsby and Storey had Nevada counties named after them.

Captain Stewart stayed in the Pyramid Lake area for a few more weeks, but the Paiutes never returned. His soldiers eventually built several earthen forts around the lake. Stewart abandoned these forts in favor of a larger fort along the Carson River. Stewart began construction in 1861 and named the post Fort Churchill.

== Battlefield ==
The battle site is located within the Pyramid Lake Indian Reservation. Except for Nevada State Route 447 and a former railroad, the landscape is relatively the same as it was in 1860. Nevada Historical Marker #148 is located near the intersection of S.R. 447 and Chicken Road on what would have been the north end of the battlefield. The marker, titled "The Two Battles of Pyramid Lake", describes both battles.
