= Joseph Stewart (U.S. Army officer) =

American military officer (1822-1904)

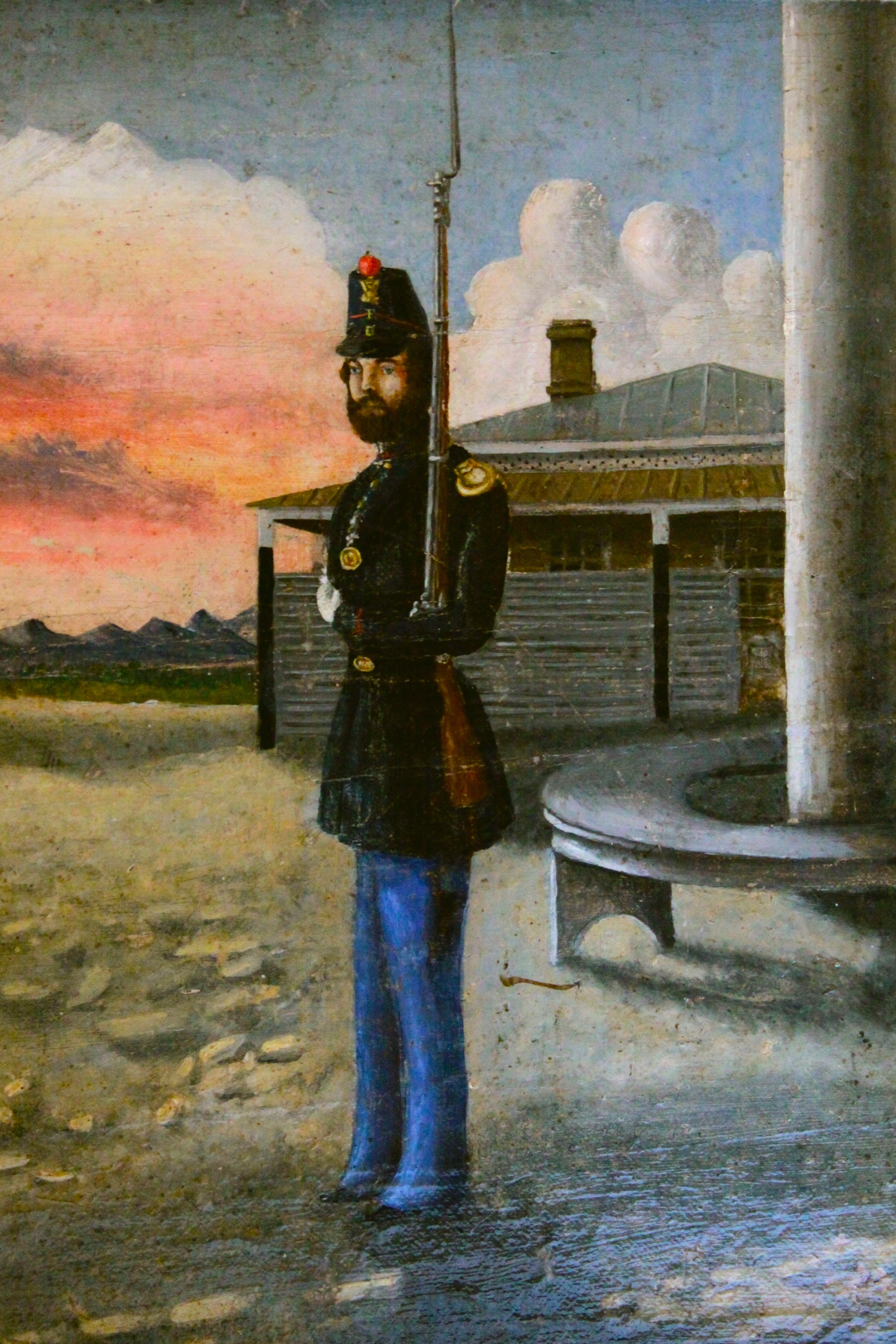
- Stewart at Fort Yuma, CA, in 1858

5th Commander of the Department of Alaska
- In office January 4, 1873 – April 20, 1874
- President: Ulysses S. Grant
- Preceded by: Harvey A. Allen
- Succeeded by: George B. Rodney Jr.

Personal details
- Born: January 29, 1822 Columbia, Kentucky
- Died: April 23, 1904 (aged 82) Berkeley, California
- Resting place: San Francisco National Cemetery
- Nickname: "Jasper"

Military service
- Allegiance: United States of America
- Branch/service: U.S. artillery
- Years of service: 1842-1879
- Rank: Lieutenant Colonel
- Commands: Fort Alcatraz; Fort Churchill; Department of Alaska
- Battles/wars: Mexican–American War; Battle of Monterrey; Pyramid Lake War; Second Battle of Pyramid Lake; American Civil War; Bannock War

Joseph Stewart (January 29, 1822 – April 23, 1904) was an officer in the United States Army notable for serving as commander of Fort Alcatraz, Fort Churchill and the Department of Alaska. His name is occasionally seen as Jasper Stewart.

== Biography ==
=== Early life ===
Joseph Stewart was born in Columbia, Kentucky on January 29, 1822, and graduated from the U.S. Military Academy at West Point in 1842. He served as a 2nd Lieutenant in the 1st U.S. Artillery and later the 3rd U.S. Artillery during the Mexican War. On January 3, 1856, he was promoted to captain of Company H in the 3rd Artillery. In December 1859 Captain Stewart took command of Fort Alcatraz. In the years immediately preceding the Civil War, Stewart transformed the fort into the most powerful coastal defense in the west. It was also during Stewart's time on Alcatraz that it took on the role of a prison for the first time. 11 soldiers under Stewart's command were imprisoned there and soon other nearby forts were sending prisoners there too.

=== Pyramid Lake War ===
In 1860 a vigilante force was soundly defeated by Paiute Indians in a battle near Pyramid Lake in present-day Nevada. This defeat prompted the Federal government to dispatch a contingent of the U.S. Army to the area. Captain Stewart took command of the so-called "Carson Valley Expedition" composed of 200 regular army soldiers from the 3rd Artillery and 6th U.S. Infantry. Stewart was, however, subordinated to Col. John C. Hays who was in command of a regiment of U.S. Volunteers. Hays and Stewart defeated the Paiutes in the second Battle of Pyramid Lake.

=== Fort Churchill ===
While Hays' volunteers disbanded shortly after the battle, Stewart's regulars remained in the area for some time. Stewart was ordered to construct a permanent army post in the area. Eventually, he chose a site along the Carson River which he suggested should be named in honor of General Sylvester Churchill. The U.S. Army confirmed the site and name in August and construction of Fort Churchill began. Construction was completed in 1861 with Stewart as the post's first commander.

=== Civil War ===
During the American Civil War Stewart briefly returned to command Fort Alcatraz. In 1861 he was transferred to the defenses of Washington, DC and commanded the artillery in George A. McCall's division of the Army of the Potomac from December 1861 to February 1862. From April to October 1862 he served as recruiting officer for San Francisco and was the Inspector General of the Humboldt Military District during the Winter of 1862/1863. He was chief of artillery for the Department of the Pacific from April to July 1863 and ended the war as recruiting officer for Salem MA from November to December 1865. On December 11, 1865, Stewart was promoted Major in the 4th U.S. Artillery.

=== Post Civil War ===
Immediately after Abraham Lincoln was shot, Stewart jumped down from the stage into the stage and chased down Booth. However, Booth mounted his horse. When Stewart grabbed the horse by the reins, Booth turned away. Stewart tried again, but Booth freed himself and fled.

Following the Civil War, Stewart commanded various forts along the eastern United States including Fort McHenry and Fort Macon. He served as the fifth commander of the Department of Alaska, from January 4, 1873, to April 20, 1874, then returned to California in command of the Presidio of San Francisco from May 8 to June 17, 1875. From 1876 to 1879 Stewart was in command of Fort Canby engaged against Native Americans during the Bannock War. On July 18, 1879, Stewart was promoted Lieutenant Colonel of the 3rd U.S. Artillery. He retired on August 25, 1879, and died in Berkeley, CA on April 23, 1904.

He is buried at San Francisco National Cemetery in the Presidio.

== See also ==
- List of governors of Alaska
