= 1924 United States presidential election in Nevada =

- November 4, 1924

Nominee	Calvin Coolidge	Robert M. La Follette	John W. Davis
Party	Republican	Independent	Democratic
Alliance		Progressive
Home state	Massachusetts	Wisconsin	West Virginia
Running mate	Charles G. Dawes	Burton K. Wheeler	Charles W. Bryan
Electoral vote	3	0	0
Popular vote	11,243	9,769	5,909
Percentage	41.76%	36.29%	21.95%
County results
Coolidge
30–40%
40–50%
50–60%
La Follette
30–40%
40–50%
Davis
40–50%
President before election
Calvin Coolidge
Republican
Elected President
Calvin Coolidge
Republican

The 1924 United States presidential election in Nevada was held on November 4, 1924, as part of the 1924 United States presidential election. State voters chose three electors to the Electoral College, who voted for president and vice president.

Nevada was won by President Calvin Coolidge (R–Massachusetts), running with Senator Charles G. Dawes, with 41.76% of the popular vote, against Senator Robert M. La Follette (I–Wisconsin), running with Senator Burton K. Wheeler, with 36.29% of the popular vote. Democratic nominee John W. Davis came third, although Ormsby County was the westernmost county in the nation to give him a plurality of its ballots.

== Results ==
General Election Results
Party	Pledged to	Elector	Votes
Republican Party	Calvin Coolidge	F. J. Button	11,243
Republican Party	Calvin Coolidge	Thomas Lindsay	11,175
Republican Party	Calvin Coolidge	Mrs. F. E. Humphrey	11,155
Independent	Robert M. La Follette	W. H. Fording	9,769
Independent	Robert M. La Follette	J. H. Pieh	9,523
Independent	Robert M. La Follette	John E. Worden	9,519
Democratic Party	John W. Davis	W. J. Bell	5,909
Democratic Party	John W. Davis	Thomas Dolf	5,883
Democratic Party	John W. Davis	Frank F. Garside	5,862
Votes cast (Note: Based on totals for highest elector on each ticket)			26,921

=== Results by county ===
County	John Calvin Coolidge Republican		John William Davis Democratic		Robert M. La Follette Sr. Independent		Margin (Note: Because Coolidge and La Follette ran in the top two places in Nevada as a whole, all margins given are Coolidge vote minus La Follette vote and Coolidge percentage minus La Follette percentage unless otherwise states for the county in question.)		Total votes cast (Note: Based on highest elector on each ticket)
County	#	%	#	%	#	%	#	%	Total votes cast
Churchill	655	41.64%	310	19.71%	608	38.65%	47	2.99%	1,573
Clark	533	32.58%	288	17.60%	815	49.82%	-282	-17.24%	1,636
Douglas	343	59.04%	95	16.35%	143	24.61%	200	34.42%	581
Elko	1,113	38.81%	604	21.06%	1,151	40.13%	-38	-1.32%	2,868
Esmeralda	241	33.20%	150	20.66%	335	46.14%	-94	-12.95%	726
Eureka	209	50.00%	94	22.49%	115	27.51%	94	22.49%	418
Humboldt	400	35.30%	248	21.89%	485	42.81%	-85	-7.50%	1,133
Lander	254	46.61%	138	25.32%	153	28.07%	101	18.53%	545
Lincoln	200	27.10%	257	34.82%	281	38.08%	-24 (Note: In this county where Coolidge finished third behind both Davis and La Follette, margin given is Davis vote minus La Follette vote and percentage margin Davis percentage minus La Follette percentage.)	-3.25%	738
Lyon	618	47.43%	231	17.73%	454	34.84%	164	12.59%	1,303
Mineral	191	37.90%	84	16.67%	229	45.44%	-38	-7.54%	504
Nye	884	39.69%	454	20.39%	889	39.92%	-5	-0.22%	2,227
Ormsby	413	44.31%	415	44.53%	104	11.16%	-2 (Note: In this county where La Follette did finish behind both Coolidge and Davis, margin given is Coolidge vote minus Davis vote and percentage margin Coolidge percentage minus Davis percentage.)	-0.21%	932
Pershing	308	36.07%	164	19.20%	382	44.73%	-74	-8.67%	854
Storey	283	37.19%	209	27.46%	269	35.35%	14	1.84%	761
Washoe	3,549	45.70%	1,669	21.49%	2,548	32.81%	1,001	12.89%	7,766
White Pine	1,049	44.52%	499	21.18%	808	34.30%	241	10.23%	2,356
Totals	11,243	41.76%	5,909	21.95%	9,769	36.29%	1,474	5.48%	26,921

==== Counties that flipped from Republican to Democratic ====
- Ormsby

==== Counties that flipped from Republican to Independent ====
- Elko
- Esmeralda
- Humboldt
- Lincoln
- Mineral
- Nye
- Pershing

==== Counties that flipped from Democratic to Independent ====
- Clark

== Ballot measures ==
During the election, three ballot measures coincided, including one that removed Article 1, Section 16, of the Constitution of Nevada, which had stated: “Foreigners who are, or who may hereafter become Bona-fide residents of this State, shall enjoy the same rights, in respect to the possession, enjoyment and inheritance of property, as native born citizens.”

== See also ==
- United States presidential elections in Nevada
