= Fort Churchill State Historic Park =

State park in Nevada, United States

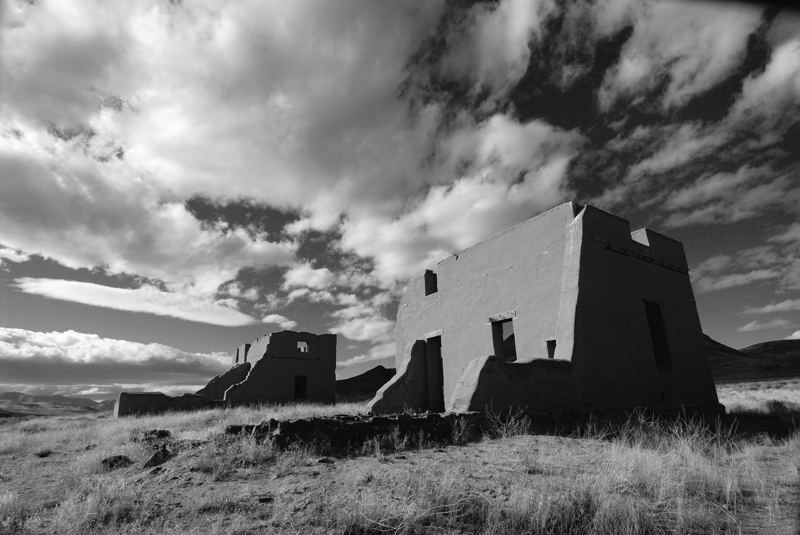

- Location within Nevada
- Location: Lyon County, Nevada, United States
- Nearest city: Silver Springs, Nevada
- Coordinates: 39°17′34″N 119°16′12″W
- Area: 5,170.24 acres (2,092.32 ha)
- Elevation: 4,255 ft (1,297 m)
- Established: 1957
- Administrator: Nevada Division of State Parks
- Visitors: 16,886 vehicles (in 2017)
- Designation: Nevada state historic park
- Website: Official website
- Fort Churchill
- U.S. National Register of Historic Places
- U.S. National Historic Landmark
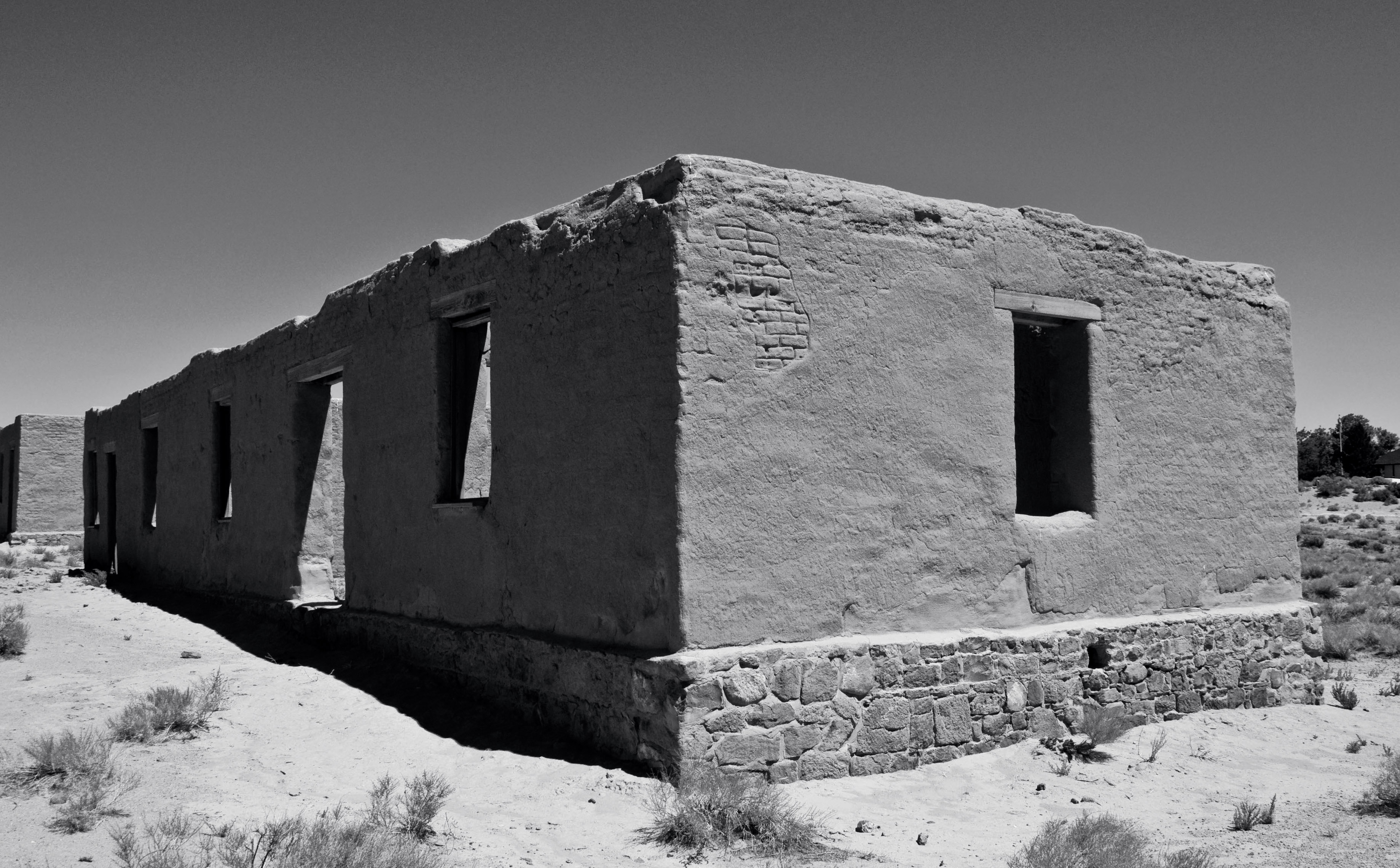
- Ruins at Fort Churchill State Historic Park
- Location: Lyon County, Nevada, United States
- Nearest city: Silver Springs, Nevada
- Area: 20 acres (8.1 ha)
- Built: 1860
- Architect: Captain Joseph Stewart, Captain F. F. Flint
- NRHP reference No.: 66000456

Significant dates
- Added to NRHP: October 15, 1966
- Designated NHL: November 5, 1961

Fort Churchill State Historic Park is a state park of Nevada, United States, preserving the remains of a United States Army fort and a way station on the Pony Express and Central Overland Routes dating back to the 1860s. The site is one end of the historic Fort Churchill and Sand Springs Toll Road. The park is in Lyon County south of the town of Silver Springs, on US Route 95 Alternate, eight miles (13 km) south of US Route 50. Fort Churchill was designated a National Historic Landmark in 1961. A 1994 park addition forms a corridor along the Carson River.

== Fort Churchill ==
=== Fort history ===
In 1860, a band of Paiutes and Bannocks attacked Williams Station along the Carson River in retaliation for the kidnap and rape of two young Paiute girls by the proprietors of the station. In retaliation, a small group of volunteer soldiers and vigilantes led by Maj. William Ormsby attacked the Native Americans, starting the so-called Pyramid Lake War. Ormsby's force was defeated and in response Colonel John C. Hays and Captain Joseph Stewart led a larger force of volunteers and US Regulars to defeat the Natives at the Second Battle of Pyramid Lake.

Captain Stewart, leading the Regular contingent, afterward established a permanent US Army fort along the Carson River near the location of where the hostilities began at Williams Station. The post was named Fort Churchill for Sylvester Churchill, Inspector General of the US Army. Construction on the fort began on July 20, 1860, and was completed in 1861. Built to provide protection for early settlers and the mail route along the Pony Express, the fort became an important supply depot for the Union Army during the American Civil War. Average strength during this time was 200 soldiers, but the post was abandoned in 1869, four years after the conclusion of the Civil War. The abandoned buildings were sold at an auction for $750 after the state of Nevada declined to take possession of the property.

=== State park ===
On October 6, 1932, the state took control of the 200 acres (81 ha) but two years later deeded the property to a local chapter of the Daughters of the American Revolution. With aid from the National Park Service, the fort ruins were partially restored to a state of arrested decay, and the Civilian Conservation Corps built the current visitor center.

In 1957, the fort became a part of Nevada's state park system. It was declared a National Historic Landmark in 1961 and added to the National Register of Historic Places in 1966.

== Carson River Ranches ==
In 1994, the state park service acquired 3,200 acres (1,300 ha) along the Carson River, east of the fort and Buckland Station. This corridor connects Fort Churchill with Lahontan State Recreation Area and provides habitat for diverse plants and wildlife. It is popular with campers, hikers, birdwatchers, canoeists, hunters, and equestrians.

== Buckland Station ==
Samuel S. Buckland came to the area in 1859 to begin ranching. His ranch served as an important way station along the Central Overland Route. The Pony Express also had a change of mounts at the ranch. When Fort Churchill was abandoned and being dismantled, Buckland salvaged materials to build the current two-story building seen today. The state park added this building to the Fort Churchill State Historic Site in 1997.

== Park facilities ==
The visitor center has exhibits on the history of Fort Churchill, Native Americans that inhabited the area, and natural features of the surrounding countryside.

A 20-site campground is situated along the Carson River within a grove of cottonwood trees with an adjacent group-camp and day-use picnic areas. A primitive camp lies further along the Carson River in the Carson River Ranches unit.

Hiking trails include a self-guided trail around the fort ruins with interpretative signs explaining each of the buildings. The Orchard Trail runs along the Carson River from the campground to Buckland Station. A continuation of this trail runs the length of the Carson River in the Carson River Ranches unit.

The Nevada Civil War Volunteers have put on a civil war encampment at Fort Churchill.

== See also ==
- List of National Historic Landmarks in Nevada
- National Register of Historic Places listings in Lyon County, Nevada
- List of the oldest buildings in Nevada
