= Harvey A. Allen =

American politician

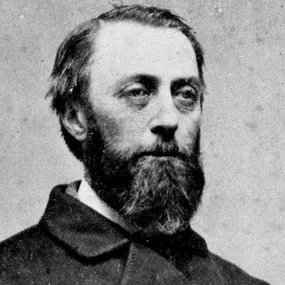

4th Commander of the Department of Alaska
- In office September 20, 1871 – January 3, 1873
- President: Ulysses S. Grant
- Preceded by: John C. Tidball
- Succeeded by: Joseph Stewart

Personal details
- Born: October 17, 1818 New Bern, North Carolina
- Died: September 20, 1882 (aged 63) Schraalenburgh, New Jersey
- Resting place: Green-Wood Cemetery

Military service
- Allegiance: (United States) United States; Union
- Branch/service: United States Army; Union Army
- Years of service: 1841–1879
- Rank: Lieutenant Colonel
- Unit: 2nd Artillery Regiment
- Commands: Department of Alaska
- Battles/wars: Mexican–American War; Siege of Veracruz; Battle of Cerro Gordo; Battle of Churubusco; Battle of Molino del Rey; Battle of Chapultepec; Battle for Mexico City; Third Seminole War; American Civil War; American Indian Wars

Harvey Abner Allen (October 17, 1818 – September 20, 1882) was an officer in the United States Army who served as the fourth commander of the Department of Alaska, from September 20, 1871, to January 3, 1873.

He graduated from West Point in 1841, and was assigned to the 2nd Artillery Regiment, serving with this unit for most of his career.

Allen died at his home in Schraalenburg, New Jersey (now Dumont, New Jersey) on September 20, 1882, and was buried in Green-Wood Cemetery in Brooklyn.

== See also ==
- Governors of Alaska

== Sources ==
- "Lieut.-Col. Harvey A. Allen" (PDF). New York Times. September 21, 1882.
- Cullum, George W. (1891). Biographical Register of the Officers and Graduates of the U. S. Military Academy, Volume II. Boston: Riverside Press. pp. 80–81.
- Gates, Nancy (2006). The Alaska Almanac: Facts About Alaska. Portland, Oregon: Alaska Northwest Books. p. 86. ISBN 0-88240-652-3.

Military offices
Preceded by John C. Tidball	Commanders of the Department of Alaska; September 20, 1871 – January 3, 1873	Succeeded by Joseph Stewart
