= 1924 Nevada State Question 2 =

Referendum repealing equal rights for immigrants in relation to property

- 4 November 1924
- Shall Senate Joint Resolution No. 2 (Thirtieth Session), relative to amending article 1 of the Constitution of the State of Nevada, by striking out section sixteen thereof, be approved (Note: Note: Ormsby County no longer exists; Carson City on the map represents Ormsby County's percentage shade.)

Results
Choice	Votes	%
Yes	6,280	50.12%
No	6,249	49.88%
County results
Yes
60–70%
50–60%
No
60–70%
50–60%

1924 Nevada State Question 2 was a proposed amendment to the Constitution of Nevada to repeal language granting equal rights to foreign-born residents of the state in relation to native-born citizens in the context of the possession, enjoyment, and inheritance of property. The measure was narrowly passed, with 6,280 votes in favor and 6,249 against.

== Background ==
Senate Joint Resolution No. 2 of the 30th session placed the amendment on the ballot. On March 5, 1923, the Nevada Senate resolved, with the Nevada Assembly concurring, the resolution.

== Results ==
The following table details the results by county:

County	Yes		No	
County	#	%	#	%
Churchill	339	46.95	383	53.05
Clark	456	63.16	266	36.84
Douglas	81	36.00	144	64.00
Elko	625	50.65	609	49.35
Esmeralda	162	57.65	119	42.35
Eureka	67	37.02	114	62.98
Humboldt	307	42.52	415	57.48
Lander	130	51.79	121	48.21
Lincoln	132	40.99	190	59.01
Lyon	265	49.07	275	50.93
Mineral	92	45.32	111	54.68
Nye	673	64.16	376	35.84
Ormsby	295	63.44	170	36.56
Pershing	172	45.38	207	54.62
Storey	150	53.38	131	46.62
Washoe	1,890	48.07	2,042	51.93
White Pine	444	43.53	576	56.47
Total	6,280	50.12	6,249	49.88

== Effect ==
The amendment repealed Article 1, Section 16, of the Constitution of Nevada, titled “Rights of foreigners,” which had stated: “Foreigners who are, or who may hereafter become Bona-fide residents of this State, shall enjoy the same rights, in respect to the possession, enjoyment and inheritance of property, as native born citizens.”
