= Fort Churchill and Sand Springs Toll Road =

- U.S. National Register of Historic Places
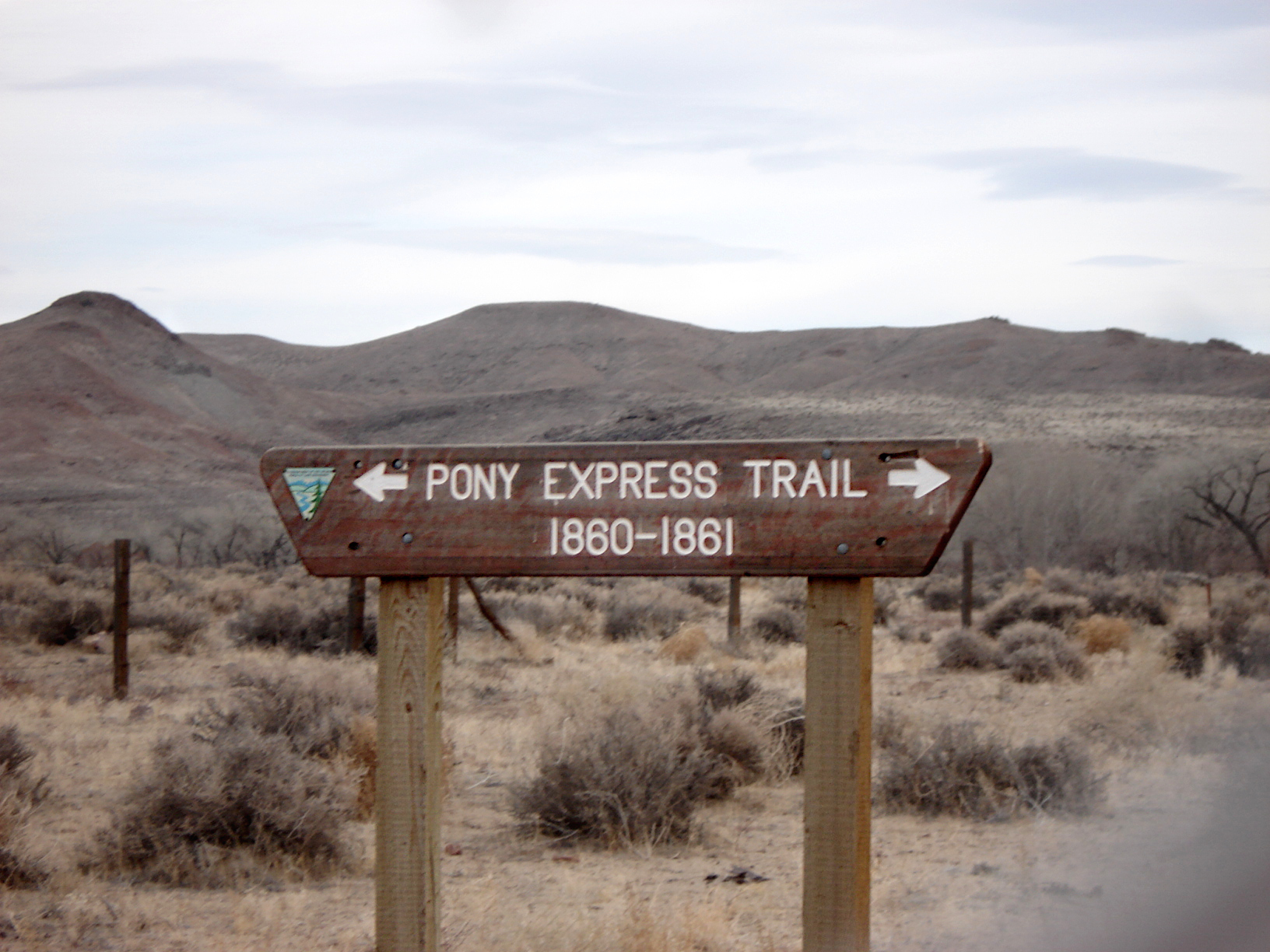
- Pony Express Trail sign on Fort Churchill Road
- NRHP reference No.: 97001383
- Added to NRHP: November 24, 1997

Fort Churchill and Sand Springs Toll Road was opened in 1866.

A segment of the toll road within Churchill County, Nevada is listed on the National Register of Historic Places on November 24, 1974. This segment allowed a team of 18 mules to pull three heavily laden freight wagons across a mountain. One end of the road was located at Fort Churchill.

Running between Dayton and the former Sand Springs Pony Express Station along US 50 east of Fallon, the route provided a reliable supply route from the Comstock, Carson City and California to the Reese River Mining District centered in Austin.

== Sources ==
- Nevada Department of Museums, Library and Arts
