= Sand Spring, Maryland =

Unincorporated community in Maryland, U.S.

Coordinates: 39°40′21″N 79°27′34″W

Sand Spring is an unincorporated community in Garrett County, Maryland, United States.

== History ==
A variant name was "Fearer". A post office called Fearer was established in 1893, and remained in operation until 1939. The origin of the name "Fearer" is obscure.
