= William Ormsby =

American settler (1814–1860)

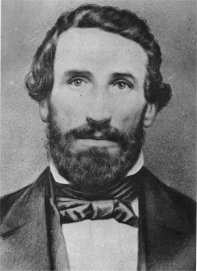
- Born: William Matthew Ormsby; 1814; Greenville, Pennsylvania, U.S.
- Died: May 12, 1860 (aged 45–46); Pyramid Lake, Nevada, U.S.
- Known for: Early settler in the state of Nevada
- Military career
- Rank: Major
- Conflicts: First Battle of Pyramid Lake

William Matthew Ormsby (1814 – May 12, 1860) was an American military leader and an early settler of the state of Nevada. He was instrumental in the establishment of Carson City and the Nevada Territory. Major Ormsby was killed leading a Militia force against Paiute Indians in what was called the Pyramid Lake War.

== Early life ==
William Matthew Ormsby was born in Greenville, Pennsylvania, in 1814. His title of "Major" may reflect service in the state militia.

With thousands of other men, Ormsby moved to California in 1849 during the California Gold Rush. His efforts at gold mining and horse sales in the West were mostly unsuccessful. He joined William Walker's filibustering expedition to Nicaragua and returned to California afterward.

== Nevada ==
Undeterred by his earlier struggles, Ormsby moved to Genoa, Utah Territory (later Nevada) in 1857 as an agent for the Pioneer Stage Line. Ormsby and other supporters of the stage line favored western Utah Territory as the focal point of their overland stage route. Ormsby presided over a meeting in Genoa which selected Judge James Crane to go to Washington, D.C., in an effort to create a new territory, which they thought should be named "Sierra Nevada". Abraham Curry also shared the vision of a new territory and foresaw that Carson City in Eagle Valley would become the new territory's capital. Curry left a large tract of land in the center of the valley open for the possibility of a capitol building.

Major Ormsby moved to Carson City and bought land to the southwest of Curry's proposed capitol site, where he constructed a hotel called the Ormsby House. His group did not succeed in 1859 in getting the federal government to designate a new territory. But, the discovery of the Comstock lode near Virginia City brought them new hope. Ormsby opened his hotel in 1860, in the wake of the Comstock Lode, as more settlers and prospectors rushed to the area. He also bought McMacklin's store and was appointed as a judge in a murder trial, indicating his stature in the town.

== Pyramid Lake War ==
In 1860 Ormsby and his wife sought companions for their daughter Lizzie. Ormsby had become friendly with Tru-ki-zo or Truckee, a Paiute elder or chief. Ormsby arranged to educate Truckee's two granddaughters, 13-year-old Sarah Winnemucca and her younger sister Elma, who came to live in the Ormsby household. Sarah already knew some English and Spanish, and Elma some English. Sarah was learning to read and write English, and the three girls learned from one another.

That year, two proprietors of Williams Station, an overland stage stop near present-day Silver Springs, kidnapped two Paiute girls and abused them. An angered group of Paiute warriors rode to Williams Station to rescue the girls, killing five white settlers and burning the station in the process. Word of the attack reached other miners and settlers, who wanted to retaliate. More than 100 vigilantes from Carson City, Virginia City, Genoa and Silver City assembled and chose Major Ormsby as their leader. Ormsby led this poorly trained and poorly armed force north from Williams Station along the Truckee River toward Pyramid Lake.

The Paiute chief Numaga ambushed Ormsby on May 12, 1860, and defeated the vigilantes, killing 76 men and wounding another 29 at what came to be known as the first Battle of Pyramid Lake. Among the dead was Major Ormsby. He and other dead were first buried at the site. Ormsby's family later arranged transfer of his body and reinterment in Carson City's Pioneer Cemetery. In a third action, his remains were exhumed and his family arranged for his removal when they left the state.

In June, Colonel John C. Hays defeated the Paiute with a second and better organized force.

== Legacy ==
- Ormsby County was named in his honor, and Storey County was named for Edward Farris Storey, another fatality of the Pyramid Lake War.
- Ormsby House continues in Carson City.
- Ormsby Blvd in Carson City was named for him.

== Sources ==
- Michno, Gregory (2003). Encyclopedia of Indian Wars: Western Battles and Skirmishes, 1850–1890. Missoula: Mountain Press Publishing Company. ISBN 0-87842-468-7.
