= Sylvester Churchill =

American journalist and army officer (1783-1862)

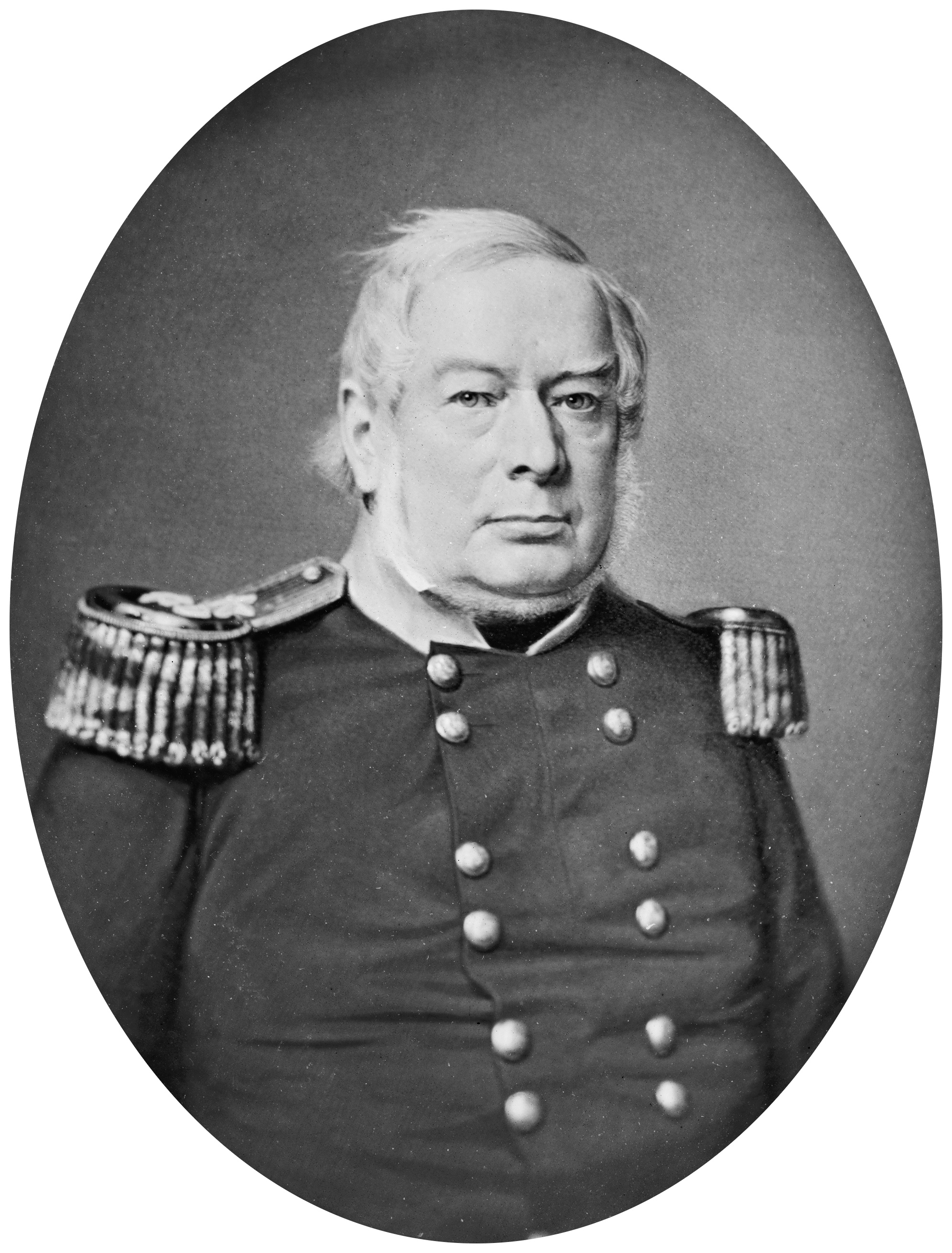
- Sylvester Churchill
- Born: August 2, 1783; Woodstock, Vermont Republic
- Died: December 7, 1862 (aged 79); Washington, D.C., U.S.
- Burial place: Oak Hill Cemetery; Georgetown, Washington, D.C., U.S.
- Military career
- Allegiance: United States of America
- Branch: United States Army; Union Army
- Service years: 1812–1861
- Rank: Colonel; Brevet Brigadier General
- Units: 1st U.S. Artillery; 3rd U.S. Artillery
- Commands: Inspector General of the Army
- Conflicts: War of 1812; Mexican–American War; Battle of Buena Vista; American Civil War

Sylvester Churchill (August 2, 1783 – December 7, 1862) was an American journalist and Regular Army officer.

== Early life ==
Churchill was born in Woodstock in the Vermont Republic in 1783, the son of Joseph and Sarah (Cobb) Churchill. Educated in the schools of his home town, he became a journalist, and published, in 1808, a weekly newspaper, "The Vermont Republican." Churchill married Lucy Hunter (1786–1862), daughter of William and Mary (Newell) Hunter, August 30, 1812, in Windsor, Vermont.

== Military career ==
At the outbreak of the War of 1812, he was appointed 1st lieutenant, 3rd U.S. Artillery on March 12, 1812, and was promoted to captain on August 15, 1813. He transferred to 1st U.S. Artillery on June 1, 1821, promoted to major, 3rd U.S. Artillery, on April 6, 1835, and colonel and Inspector General on June 25, 1841. He received the rank of brevet brigadier general, to date from February 23, 1847, in recognition of his services under General John E. Wool, at the Battle of Buena Vista during the Mexican–American War. At the beginning of the American Civil War, he had been Inspector General of the Regular Army for 20 years. He was retired September 25, 1861, due to ill health, and succeeded by Randolph B. Marcy.

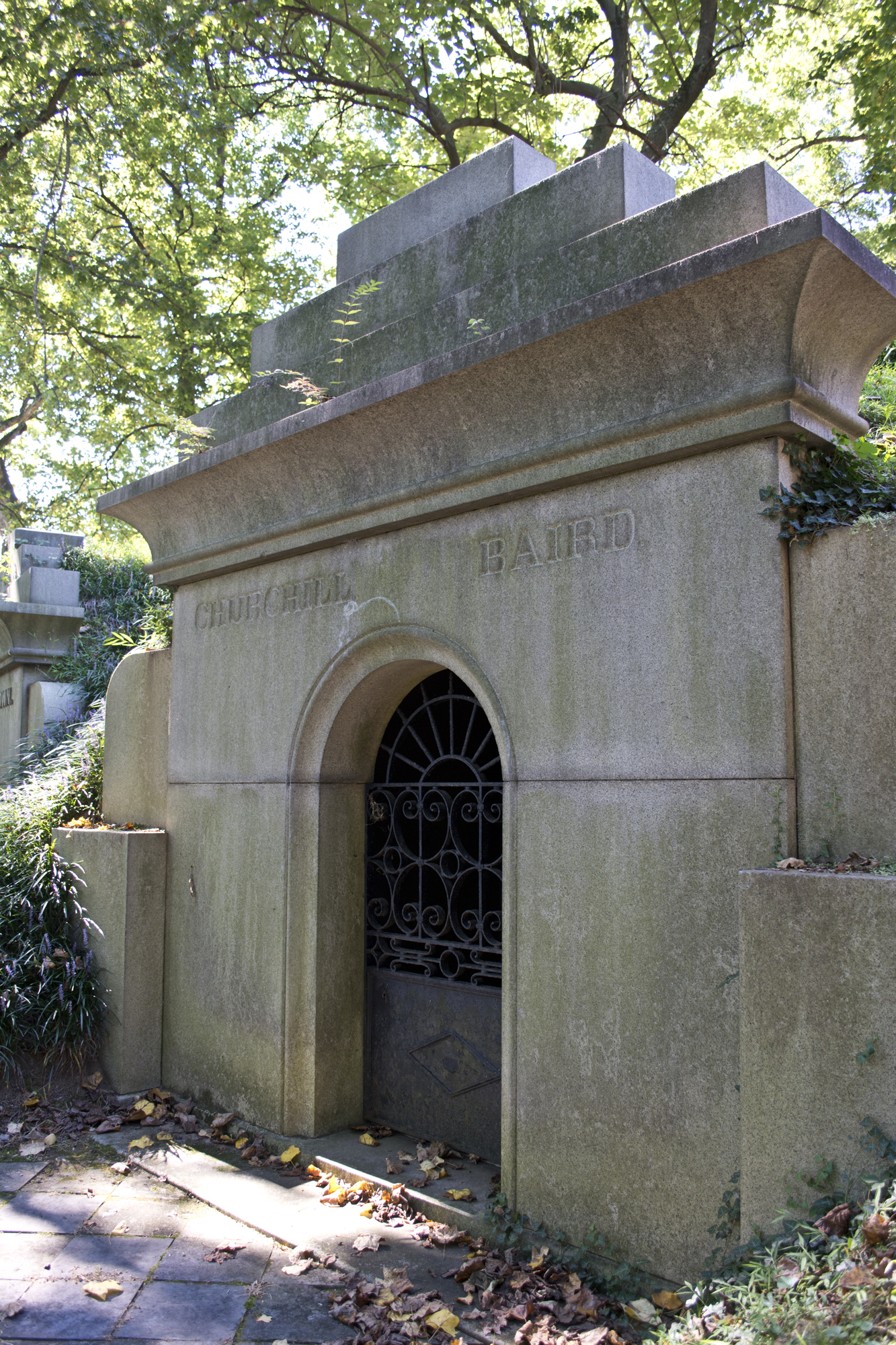
Mausoleum in Oak Hill Cemetery containing the remains of Churchill

Churchill died on December 7, 1862, in Washington, D.C. He was buried at Oak Hill Cemetery in Washington, D.C.

Churchill County, Nevada, established in 1861, was named after him, as was Fort Churchill, in Silver Springs, Nevada. The fort was built in 1861 and abandoned in 1869.

Churchill was a distant relative of Winston Churchill. The family resemblance evident in the portrait was noted by Winston Churchill and his contemporaries.
