= Ormsby County, Nevada =

Former county in Nevada, United States (1861–1969)

Coordinates: 39°09′53″N 119°46′35″W

Ormsby County
- County of Nevada
- 1861–1969
- Flag

- 1861 map of Nevada Territory, with Ormsby County highlighted
- Capital: Carson City
- Population
  - 1870: 3,668
  - 1960: 8,063
- History
  - Established: November 25, 1861
  - Merged: April 1, 1969
- Contained within
  - Country: United States
  - Territory: Nevada Territory (1861–1864)
  - State: Nevada (1864–1969)
Succeeded by
Carson City

Ormsby County was a county in the Territory and later State of Nevada from 1861 until 1969. The county seat was Carson City, founded two years earlier and which later became the state capital.

== Name ==
It was named after Major William Ormsby, one of the original settlers of Carson City, killed along with seventy-five other men in 1860, in an unsuccessful attempt to subdue a perceived uprising of Paiute people near Pyramid Lake, Nevada, which was at the time part of Utah Territory.

== History ==
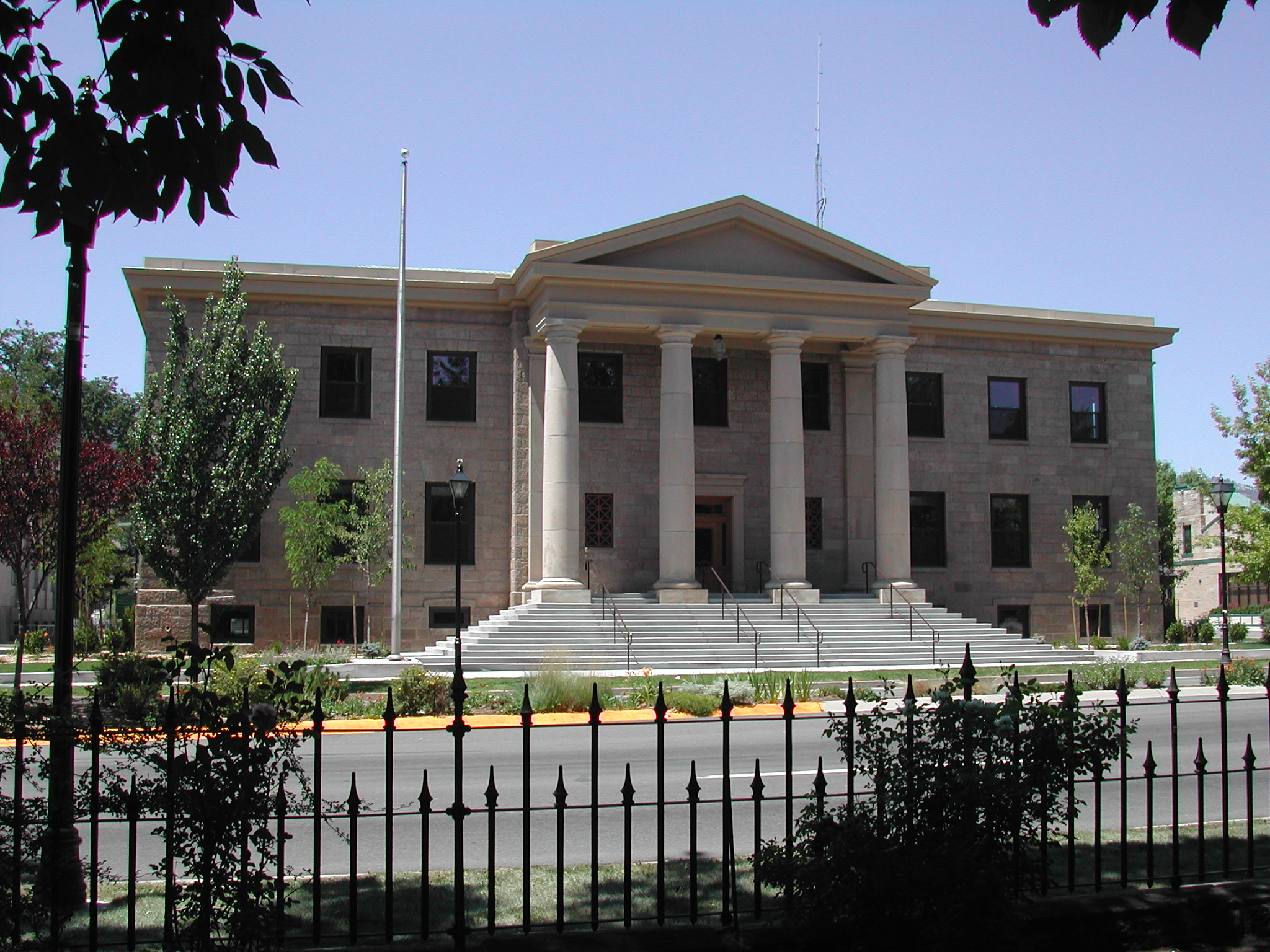
Ormsby County Courthouse in Carson City.

Ormsby County was established in 1861 with creation of Nevada Territory. The county's population dwindled significantly after the gold rush days. The vast majority of the population lived in Carson City and a few surrounding hamlets. By the 1960 census, all but 2,900 of the county's 8,300 residents lived in Carson City. Discussions began about merging Carson City with Ormsby County after World War II. However, the effort never got beyond the planning stages until 1966, when a statewide referendum formally approved the merger. The required constitutional amendment was passed in 1968. On April 1, 1969, Ormsby County and Carson City officially merged as the Consolidated Municipality of Carson City.

== Politics ==
United States presidential election results for Ormsby County, Nevada
Year	Republican		Democratic		Third party(ies)	
Year	No.	%	No.	%	No.	%
1868	500	54.35%	420	45.65%	0	0.00%
1872	514	62.38%	310	37.62%	0	0.00%
1876	844	62.52%	506	37.48%	0	0.00%
1880	624	57.99%	452	42.01%	0	0.00%
1884	537	61.58%	335	38.42%	0	0.00%
1888	570	61.69%	354	38.31%	0	0.00%
1892	417	48.38%	31	3.60%	414	48.03%
1896	284	33.41%	550	64.71%	16	1.88%
1900	311	43.80%	399	56.20%	0	0.00%
1904	409	60.15%	218	32.06%	53	7.79%
1908	350	46.60%	343	45.67%	58	7.72%
1912	150	22.22%	294	43.56%	231	34.22%
1916	534	43.52%	610	49.71%	83	6.76%
1920	592	57.81%	413	40.33%	19	1.86%
1924	413	44.31%	415	44.53%	104	11.16%
1928	590	58.07%	426	41.93%	0	0.00%
1932	486	45.63%	579	54.37%	0	0.00%
1936	533	41.71%	745	58.29%	0	0.00%
1940	748	48.79%	785	51.21%	0	0.00%
1944	841	55.84%	665	44.16%	0	0.00%
1948	1,095	60.80%	681	37.81%	25	1.39%
1952	1,653	74.06%	579	25.94%	0	0.00%
1956	1,749	68.03%	822	31.97%	0	0.00%
1960	1,946	60.27%	1,283	39.73%	0	0.00%
1964	1,997	48.40%	2,129	51.60%	0	0.00%
1968	3,169	56.58%	1,770	31.60%	662	11.82%

== See also ==
- Empire City, Nevada - Former town of Ormsby County, that was merged into Carson City
- Stewart Indian School - Former Indian school and separate village from Carson, merged into Carson City with the consolidation
- List of former United States counties
- List of Nevada counties
