= Edward Farris Storey =

American settler

Edward Farris Storey (July 21, 1829 – June 2, 1860) was a Nevada settler who was killed during the Paiute War. Storey County, Nevada, was named in his honor.

Storey was born July 21, 1829, to John Thompson Storey and Lucy McLester. On January 2, 1849, Storey married Adella Coloway, in Georgetown, Texas. After Adella's death in 1852, Storey and his young daughter Juliann travelled to California with a group of 42 Texans, settling in Visalia. Storey was granted a charter to found a Masonic Lodge, Texas Lodge No. 46 F. & A. M., in the San Juan Bautista area in 1854. Storey later moved to Nevada and was an early resident of Virginia City, Nevada.

During the Paiute or Pyramid Lake War, Storey organized and commanded Company K, Nevada Militia, known as the "Virginia City Rifles". On June 2, 1860, Storey was shot and killed during the Second Battle of Pyramid Lake. He is buried in the Silver Terrace Cemetery in Virginia City. His tomb monument is shown and referred to in Fredric Hobbs' 1973 film, Godmonster of Indian Flats.
