= First Battle of Pyramid Lake =

Coordinates: 39.83°N 119.36°W

- Part of Pyramid Lake War
Date	12 May 1860
Location	Nixon, Nevada
Result	Paiute victory

Belligerents
United States	Paiute

Commanders and leaders
(United States) William Ormsby †	Numaga

Strength
105 Militia	500 warriors

Casualties and losses
76 killed about 29 wounded	About 10 wounded

The First Battle of Pyramid Lake in 1860 was one of the opening conflicts of the Paiute War in Nevada between the American people and the Paiute people, who had resisted the increasing numbers of migrants who traveled the California Trail through their territory, taking scarce game and water resources, as well as altercations with the Pony Express.

== Background ==
In 1859, the news broke that silver had been found in the huge Comstock Lode in Washoe, a region that was then in the western part of Utah Territory, and that would soon become the territory of Nevada. Hordes of miners flooded to the mining center of Virginia City, near to Carson City. They cut down pinyon trees to make fuel for ore-processing, destroying the pine-nut orchards that were essential to the Paiute food economy. Hunters and trappers took big game, fish, and waterfowl to feed the miners. Ranchers moved into the fertile valleys, cutting off access to places where nuts, roots, and seeds could be gathered.

The Paiutes and their allies, the Bannocks and Shoshones, gathered at Pyramid Lake towards the end of April 1860 for a conference on how to deal with the encroachments of the white men. Most of the leaders spoke out for war. Chief Winnemucca (Poito), the most senior leader at the assembly, appeared to be in favor of war, but refrained from taking a public position. Numaga was the only chief who spoke in favor of peace. He agreed that the white men had greatly wronged the Indians, but pointed out that given their numbers and resources, the whites would be bound to win any war.

While Numaga was speaking, a group of Indians arrived and brought news of an incident that had just happened at Williams Station. Mogoannoga, a mixed-race Bannock warrior, had led a raiding party to attack a Pony Express station called Williams Station, on the Carson River near present-day Lake Lahontan. One version says the raid was an unprovoked attack to provoke war. Another says the raiders had heard that men at the station had kidnapped two Paiute women, and fighting broke out when they went to investigate and free the women. Either way, the war party killed five Americans. After hearing what had taken place, Numaga said, "There is no longer any use for counsel; we must prepare for war, for the soldiers will now come here to fight us."

== Battle ==
William Ormsby assembled 105 militia men from Virginia City, Gold Hill, Carson City, and Genoa to rescue the station and punish the Paiute war party. Ormsby, an experienced military veteran, rallied the citizens of Virginia City. The assembled delegates appointed a militia jury that quickly commissioned Ormsby as a captain of militia. With his small platoon, Ormsby marched to Gold Hill, Nevada, Carson City, Nevada, and Genoa, Nevada, where they recruited further militia. In the preceding period, William Ormsby had become friendly with many important Paiute leaders, including Chief Truckee. At the time, Ormsby was supervising the education of Sarah Winnemucca, daughter of a chief. Given his military and political background, the militia force, now numbering 105 men, elected William Ormsby as their major under the laws of the militia. Ormsby marched to Williams Station, gave a Christian burial to the mutilated and dead men, and continued north to Pyramid Lake following the Truckee River.

On 12 May 1860, Ormsby sent out a scouting party led by Captain Archie McDonald. This party saw two Indians and were chasing after them when a much larger group of Indians appeared. The scouts fled back to the main body. They were not pursued. Ormsby's force was in a tight spot, strung out along the river with a bluff on one side and a cliff on the other. Numaga let about 100 warriors show themselves, drawing Ormsby's fire, then a larger group appeared and advanced against the white men. Ormsby also advanced, uphill and dazzled by the late afternoon sun, into fire from the Indians. Seeing other Indians circling in his rear, Ormsby ordered a retreat.

The white volunteers tried to take a stand in a gulch near some cottonwoods, but were pursued by the Indians, and found themselves under fire from other Indians stationed in the cottonwoods. The white men had expected the Indians to only have bows and arrows, and were armed with handguns. They found that the Indians were well-armed with rifles, with much greater range and accuracy, and they were surrounded. Some tried to escape across the river, but it was flowing too fast with the spring runoff. Others tried to escape uphill. With the battle won, Numaga tried to stop further killing, but his warriors' blood was up. Ormsby was killed, and 76 of the militiamen died in total. Most of the remaining 29 survivors were wounded, and were saved only by the cover of darkness. They hid until the Indians had left, then made their way back to Buckland Station.

== Aftermath ==
Because of these attacks, the settlers called for help. John C. Hays, noted former Texas Ranger, went to Carson City to organize and train a volunteer army regiment. The U.S. Army also sent Regular troops from California. The U.S. Volunteers and Regulars defeated the Paiute at the Second Battle of Pyramid Lake.

== See also ==
- List of battles won by Indigenous peoples of the Americas
