= John Coffee Hays =

American military officer (1817–1883)

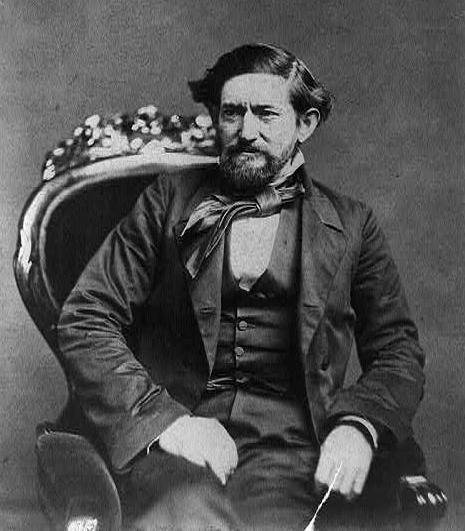
- John Coffee Hays, circa 1857
- Born: January 28, 1817; Wilson County, Tennessee, U.S.
- Died: April 21, 1883 (aged 66); Piedmont, California, U.S.
- Burial place: Mountain View Cemetery; Oakland, California, U.S.
- Military career
- Allegiance: Republic of Texas; United States
- Branch: Texas Ranger Division
- Service years: joined Rangers in 1836
- Rank: Captain, Texas Rangers; Colonel, U.S.V.
- Nicknames: "Jack"; "Brave-Too-Much"
- Commands: 1st Mounted Texas Rifles; Washoe Regiment
- Conflicts: Texas Revolution; Texas–Indian Wars: Battle of Plum Creek; Battle of Bandera Pass; Mexican invasion of Texas; Mexican–American War: Battle of Monterrey; Pyramid Lake War: Battle of Williams Station; Second Battle of Pyramid Lake
- Other work: Sheriff, politician

John Coffee Hays (January 28, 1817 – April 21, 1883) was an American military officer. A captain in the Texas Rangers and a military officer of the Republic of Texas, Hays served in several armed conflicts from 1836 to 1848, including against the Comanche Empire in Texas and during the Mexican–American War.

== Biography ==
John Hays was born at Little Cedar Lick, Wilson County, Tennessee. His father Harmon A. Hays fought in the War of 1812, naming his son for a relative by marriage, Colonel John Coffee.

In 1836, at the age of 19, Hays migrated to the Republic of Texas. Sam Houston appointed him as a member of a company of Texas Rangers because he knew the Hays family from his Tennessee years. He met with Houston and delivered a letter of recommendation from then-President Andrew Jackson, his great uncle. Rachel Jackson was Hays' great aunt of the Donelson family, a relative of his mother.

In the following years, Hays led the Rangers on a campaign against the Comanche in Texas, and succeeded in weakening their power. He rode with a Lipan Chief named Flacco who led the charge into every battle with him. The duo led and inspired the Rangers. In 1840 Tonkawa Chief Placido and 13 scouts joined with the Rangers to track down a large Comanche war party, culminating at the Battle of Plum Creek. He would then led another group of Texas Rangers by himself in a gunfight that became known as Battle of Walker's Creek.

Later, Hays commanded the force against the invasion from Mexico of 1842. During the Mexican–American War (1846–1848), Hays commanded the First Regiment of Texas Rangers at the Battle of Monterrey, established six companies along the northern and western frontier of Texas. He then commanded the Second of Texas Rangers in Winfield Scott's Mexico City campaign. Later, while fighting under Gen. Joseph Lane, who was defending the American line of communications with Vera Cruz, Hays defeated superior numbers of Mexican cavalry at the Affair at Galaxara Pass and Mexican guerillas in the Skirmish at Matamoros and the action of Sequalteplan. The Rangers excelled during this conflict, gaining nationwide fame. Hays was the first to use the Navy Colt Paterson five-shot revolver. He expedited Samuel Walker to meet with Samuel Colt which led to the design of the legendary Colt Walker six-shot revolver used in the Old West. Hays received Walker Pistol #1001; a second pistol he acquired in 1853 was a Colt .36 Model 1851 # 98229

=== Marriage and family ===
On April 29, 1847, in the Magnolia Hotel, Hays married Susan Calvert, a descendant of George Calvert, First Baron Baltimore, in Seguin, Texas, where he had his home.

The Comanche held Hays in a high position of infamy and notoriety. Upon the birth of Hays' first son in California, Chief Buffalo Hump sent the Hays family a gift, a golden spoon engraved "Buffalo Hump Jr.".

When son John Caperton Hays married Anna McMullin in San Francisco, two Texas Ranger legacies were combined. Her father, Captain John McMullin, was one of Hays' closest friends; he had followed him to California.

Jack Hays' brother was Confederate Brigadier General Harry T. Hays of New Orleans. Their sister Sarah "Sallie" Hays Hammond was the mother of John Hays Hammond. John Hays Hammond, Jr., was an apprentice to Thomas Edison and worked with Nikola Tesla; he was on the board of directors for RCA.

== Post–Mexican War years ==
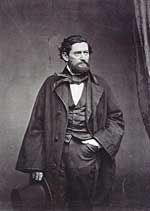
Captain John Coffee Hays of the Texas Rangers, photograph date unknown

In 1849, Hays was appointed by the United States government as the US Indian agent for the Gila River country in New Mexico and Arizona.

The same year Hays joined the migration to California, leading a party of Forty Niners from New York that traveled in wagons to California from Texas. This party pioneered a shortcut on Cooke's Wagon Road that saved a long journey to the south. That improved route became known as the Tucson Cutoff. Hays was elected sheriff of San Francisco County in 1850, and later became active in politics. In 1853, he was appointed US surveyor-general for California.

Hays was one of the earliest residents of the city of Oakland. In the following years, he amassed a considerable fortune through real estate and ranching enterprises. In 1860, while in Virginia City, Nevada, on business, he heard the news of the First Battle of Pyramid Lake. He commanded a force of volunteer soldiers at the Second Battle of Pyramid Lake.

== American Civil War and later years ==
During the Civil War, Hays retired from military involvement.

In 1876, Hays was elected as a delegate to the Democratic Party national convention, which nominated Samuel J. Tilden for the presidency of the United States.

== Death ==
John Hays died in California on April 21, 1883, and his remains were interred at Mountain View Cemetery in Oakland.

== Legacy and honors ==
John C. Hays is the namesake of Hays County, Texas. "Hays" is etched in his honor, on the side of the Hall of State, Dallas, Texas.

== Bibliography ==
- Gwynne, S. C. Empire of the Summer Moon: Quanah Parker and the Rise and Fall of the Comanches, the Most Powerful Indian Tribe in American History, New York: Scribner, 2010;
- Robinson, Charles, The Men Who Wear the Star: The Story of the Texas Rangers, Modern Library, (2001). ISBN 0-375-75748-1.
- Swift, Roy, Three Roads to Chihuahua: The Great Wagon Roads that Opened the Southwest, Eakin Press (1988). ISBN 0-89015-640-9.
- Webb, Walter Prescott, The Texas Rangers: A Century of Frontier Justice, University of Texas Press, (1965, second ed.).
- Wilkins, Frederick, The Legend Begins: The Texas Rangers, 1823–1845, State House Press, (1996). ISBN 1-880510-41-3.
- Wilkins, Frederick, Defending the Borders: The Texas Rangers, 1848–1861, State House Press, (2001). ISBN 1-880510-41-3.
- Wilkins, Frederick, The Law Comes to Texas: The Texas Rangers 1870–1901, State House Press, (1999). ISBN 1-880510-61-8.
