= Silver Peak (Alpine County, California) =

Mountain in Alpine County, California, United States

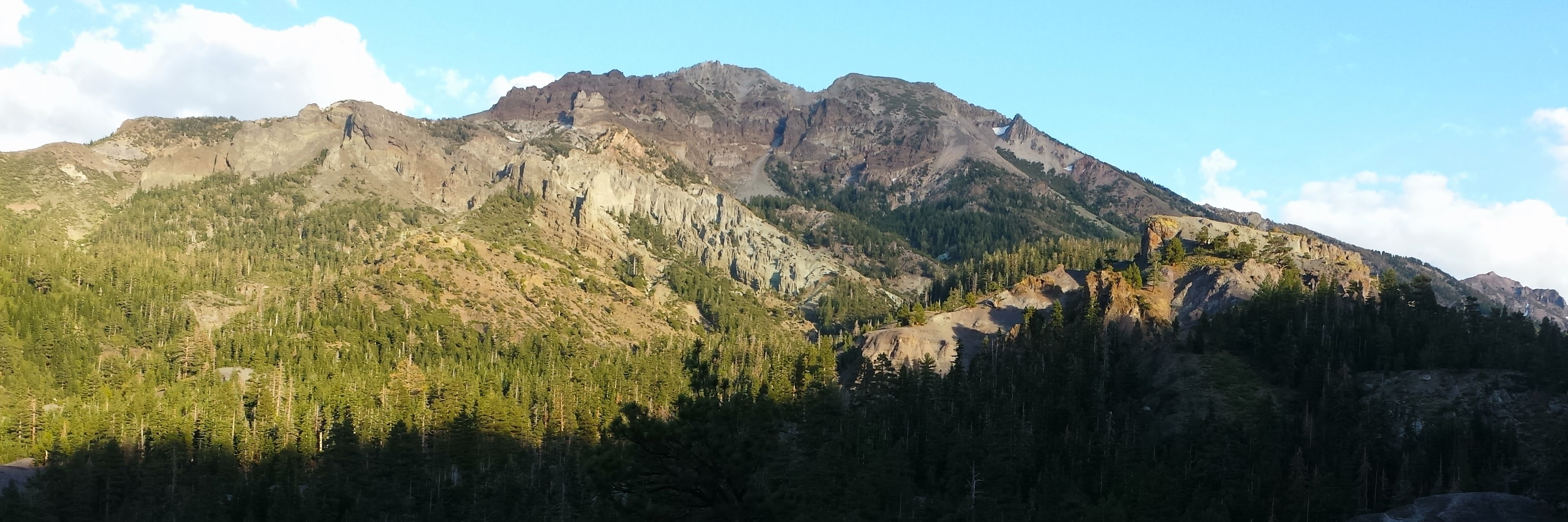
- Northwest aspect

Highest point
- Elevation: 10,820 ft (3,298 m)
- Prominence: 800 ft (244 m)
- Parent peak: Highland Peak (10,936 ft)
- Isolation: 1.62 mi (2.61 km)
- Coordinates: 38°34′02″N 119°45′29″W

Geography
- Location within California Location within the United States
- Country: United States
- State: California
- County: Alpine
- Protected area: Carson–Iceberg Wilderness
- Parent range: Sierra Nevada
- Topo map: USGS Ebbetts Pass

Geology
- Mountain type: Lava dome
- Rock type: Rhyolite

Climbing
- Easiest route: class 3

Silver Peak is a 10,820-foot-elevation (3,298-meter) mountain summit in Alpine County, California, United States.

== Description ==
Silver Peak is located in the Sierra Nevada mountain range, 3.2 miles northeast of Ebbetts Pass in the Carson-Iceberg Wilderness, on land managed by Humboldt–Toiyabe National Forest. The nearest town is Markleeville 8.5 mile (13.7 km) to the north and the nearest higher neighbor is Highland Peak 1.63 mile (2.6 km) to the south. Precipitation runoff from this mountain drains into tributaries of the East Fork Carson River. Topographic relief is significant as the summit rises 3,400 feet (1,000 meters) above Noble Canyon in 1.6 mile (2.6 km). The mountain's toponym has been officially adopted by the United States Board on Geographic Names.

== Climate ==
According to the Köppen climate classification system, Silver Peak is located in an alpine climate zone. Most weather fronts originate in the Pacific Ocean, and travel east toward the Sierra Nevada mountains. As fronts approach, they are forced upward by the peaks (orographic lift), causing them to drop their moisture in the form of rain or snowfall onto the range.

== See also ==
- List of the major 3000-meter summits of California

== Gallery ==
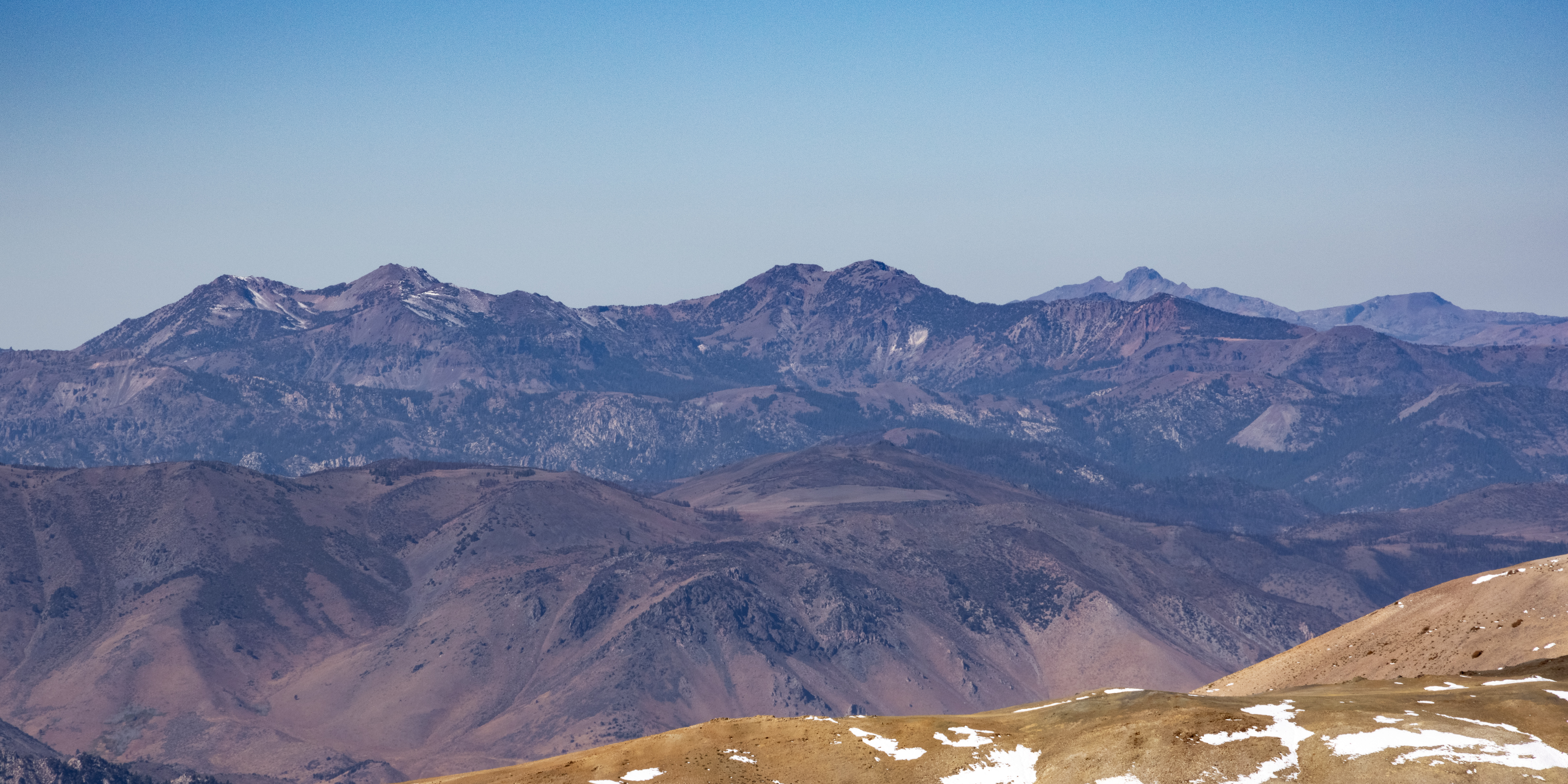
Highland Peak (left), Silver Peak (center), and Round Top (right)

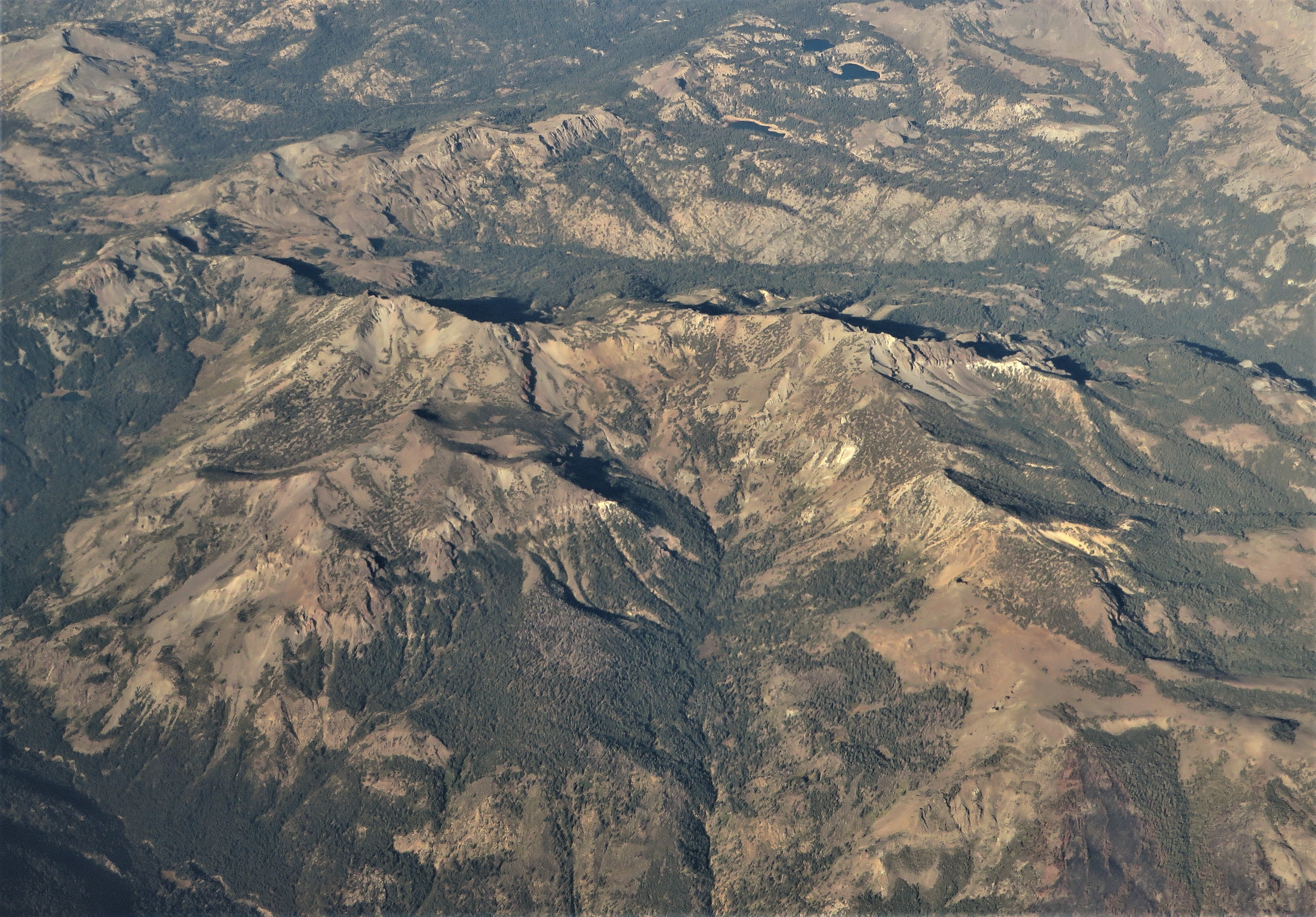
Aerial view looking west at Highland Peak (left) and Silver Peak (right)
