= Water Gap and Schuylkill Railroad =

The Water Gap and Schuylkill Railroad was a proposed railroad in eastern Pennsylvania to connect Pottsville with Stroudsburg. Chartered in 1881, it would have carried coal produced by the Alliance Coal Company near Pottsville to the New Jersey Midland Railway, but the coal company reached an agreement with the Central Railroad of New Jersey to carry that traffic before construction could start on the Water Gap and Schuylkill. In 1884, a short section of track was built in Pottsville under the Water Gap and Schuylkill charter in an unsuccessful attempt to block the construction of the Pennsylvania Railroad's Schuylkill Branch.

== History ==
The Water Gap and Schuylkill Railroad was incorporated on June 4, 1881, to run from Pottsville northeast to the New Jersey state line at or near the Delaware Water Gap, a line of about 65 miles (105 km). It was authorized to issue up to $3,000,000 of stock. Incorporators of the new company included the industrialist Abram S. Hewitt, attorney John B. Storm of Stroudsburg, and banker Henry Whelan of Philadelphia. Whelan was elected president of the new company.

Hewitt was the head of Cooper, Hewitt & Co., whose subsidiary, the Alliance Coal Company, owned 4,000 acres (1,600 ha) of coal lands in the Pottsville region. At the time, this area was served exclusively by the Philadelphia and Reading Railroad (the "Reading"). Whelan had become a director of the Midland Railroad of New Jersey when it was formed by the reorganization of the New Jersey Midland Railway in 1880. Anthracite producers around Scranton and Tamaqua sought to undercut the anthracite cartel organized by the Reading's Franklin B. Gowen, and looked to the Midland to provide an outlet for their coal. The Midland had charter rights through subsidiaries to build from the Water Gap through Stroudsburg to Wilkes-Barre, Pennsylvania. This would have tapped the coal fields around Scranton, while the Water Gap and Schuylkill would have passed through Tamaqua on the way to Pottsville. It was surveyed from Stroudsburg to Tamaqua in July 1881.

Plans for the Water Gap and Schuylkill were abruptly terminated in August 1881 by a reorganization of the Alliance Coal Company. Of $1,500,000 of stock in the new company, $300,000 was held by Cooper, Hewitt & Co., representing their original stake, while $1,100,000 was paid in by "New York capitalists" and $100,000 by the Central Railroad of New Jersey (CNJ). $400,000 of this capital was earmarked to develop the coal lands of the company and open mines. The Reading agreed to haul the company's coal from Pottsville to Tamaqua, where the CNJ could bring it to New York, at the same rate per mile as the CNJ. Rossiter W. Raymond, a mining engineer and associate of Hewitt's, became president of the new company, Hewitt its treasurer, and Frederic A. Potts, president of the Midland, its vice-president. However, the Water Gap and Schuylkill had no economic rationale without the coal traffic now contracted to the CNJ, and plans to build it were given up.

The dormant Water Gap and Schuylkill was sold to the CNJ, which was itself leased by the Reading in 1883. At the end of 1883, the chartering of the Pottsville and Mahanoy Railroad demonstrated that the Pennsylvania Railroad planned to extend its Schuylkill Branch through Pottsville to a connection with the Lehigh Valley Railroad. This branch line paralleled the Reading into the heart of the latter's territories, and the Reading employed frog wars and other obstructive tactics in an attempt to halt construction.

In January 1884, Reading crews working at night laid a double track along Coal Street in Pottsville, under the Water Gap and Schuylkill charter, to preemptively occupy the route chosen by the Pottsville and Mahanoy. The Pottsville and Mahanoy obtained an injunction against the Water Gap and Schuylkill, which was sustained in May 1884. With the failure of this attempt, the Water Gap and Schuylkill was abandoned and no further attempt was made to construct it.

== Notes and references ==
=== Works cited ===
- Mohowski, Robert E. (2003). The New York, Susquehanna & Western Railroad. Baltimore, Maryland: Johns Hopkins University Press. ISBN 0-8018-7222-7.
- Taber, Thomas T. III (1987). Railroads of Pennsylvania Encyclopedia and Atlas. Thomas T. Taber III. ISBN 0-9603398-5-X.
