= Raymond Peak =

Mountain summit

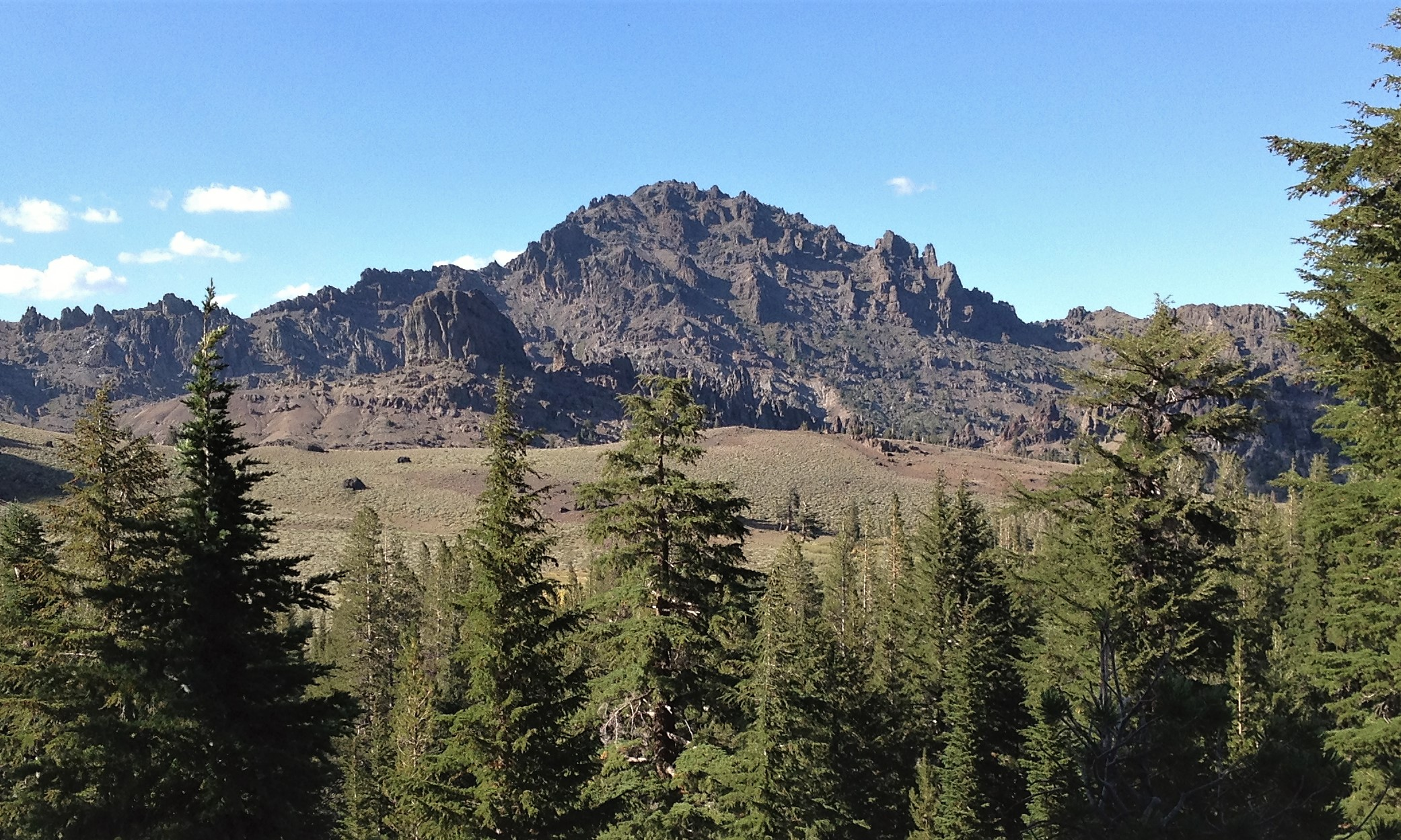
- South aspect, from PCT

Highest point
- Elevation: 10,014 ft (3,052 m)
- Prominence: 1,282 ft (391 m)
- Parent peak: Silver Peak (10,820 ft)
- Isolation: 4.79 mi (7.71 km)
- Coordinates: 38°36′13″N 119°50′00″W

Naming
- Etymology: Rossiter W. Raymond

Geography
- Location within California Location within the United States
- Location: Mokelumne Wilderness
- Country: United States of America
- State: California
- County: Alpine
- Parent range: Sierra Nevada
- Topo map: USGS Ebbetts Pass

Geology
- Rock age: Late Tertiary
- Rock type: Andesite

Raymond Peak is a 10,014-foot-elevation (3,052-meter) mountain summit located in Alpine County, California, United States.

== Description ==
Raymond Peak is set 4.5 miles (7.2 km) north of Ebbetts Pass in the Mokelumne Wilderness, on land managed by Humboldt–Toiyabe National Forest. It is situated in the Sierra Nevada mountain range, with precipitation runoff from the peak draining into tributaries of the Carson River. Topographic relief is significant as the south aspect rises 1,650 feet (500 meters) above Pennsylvania Creek in one-half mile. Neighbors include Reynolds Peak, 1.7 miles (2.7 km) to the south and Highland Peak, six miles (9.7 km) southeast. The Pacific Crest Trail traverses three-quarters of the circumference of the base of the mountain, providing an approach option from Ebbetts Pass or Lower Sunset Lake. The jagged volcanic pinnacles that form Raymond Peak are visible from Highway 395 when travelling southbound from Carson City, Nevada, approximately 30 miles distant.

== Etymology ==
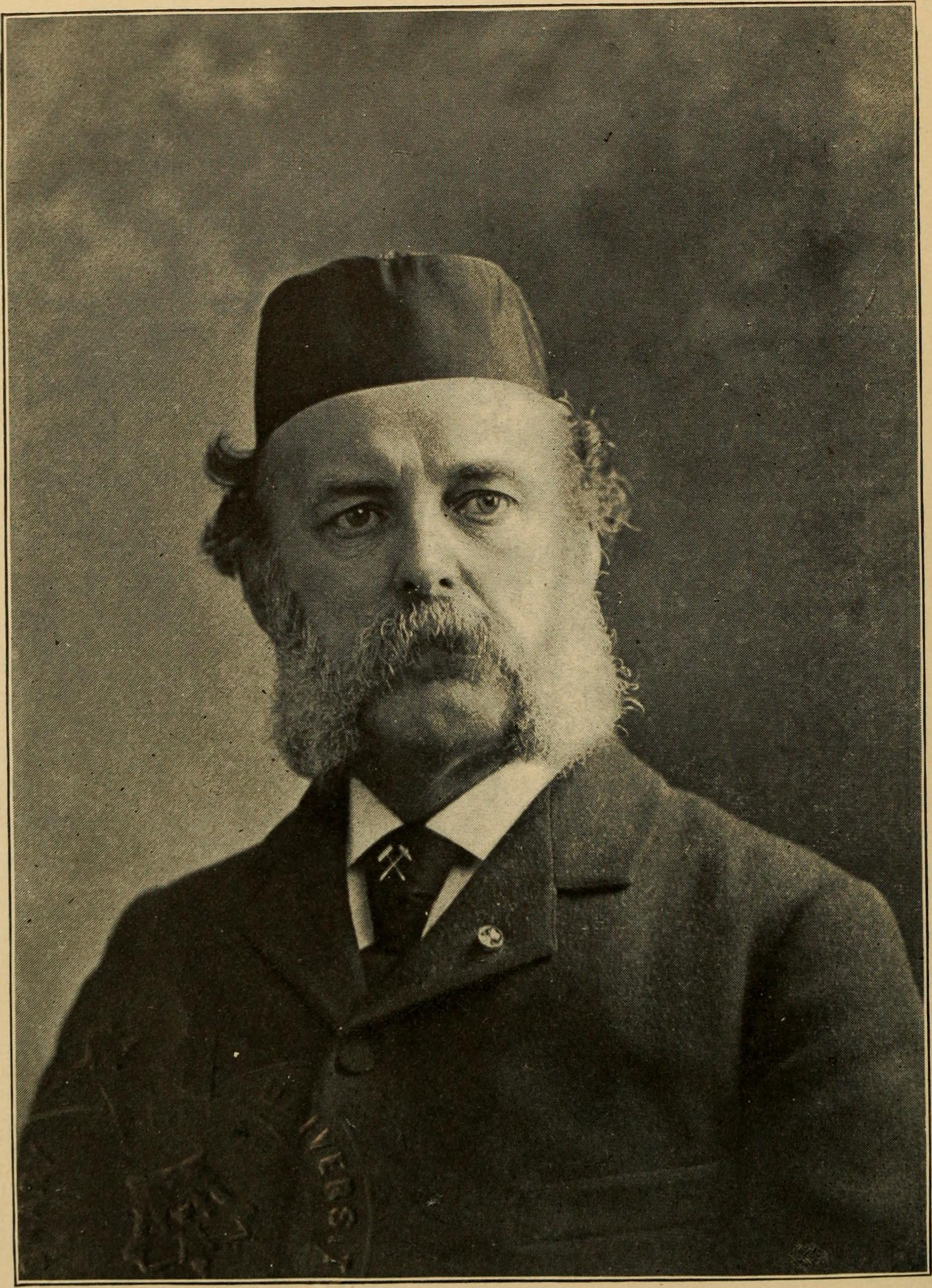
Raymond

The Whitney Survey named this landform in 1865, and the toponym has been officially adopted by the U.S. Board on Geographic Names to honor Rossiter W. Raymond (1840–1918), an American mining engineer, legal scholar and author. His books contained reports about the state of mining activity in Alpine County. The names of nearby geographical features such as Raymond Lake, Raymond Canyon Creek, Raymond Meadows, and Raymond Meadows Creek are derived from the peak.

== Climate ==
According to the Köppen climate classification system, Raymond Peak is located in an alpine climate zone. Most weather fronts originate in the Pacific Ocean and travel east toward the Sierra Nevada mountains. As fronts approach, they are forced upward by the peaks (orographic lift), causing them to drop their moisture in the form of rain or snowfall onto the range.

== Gallery ==
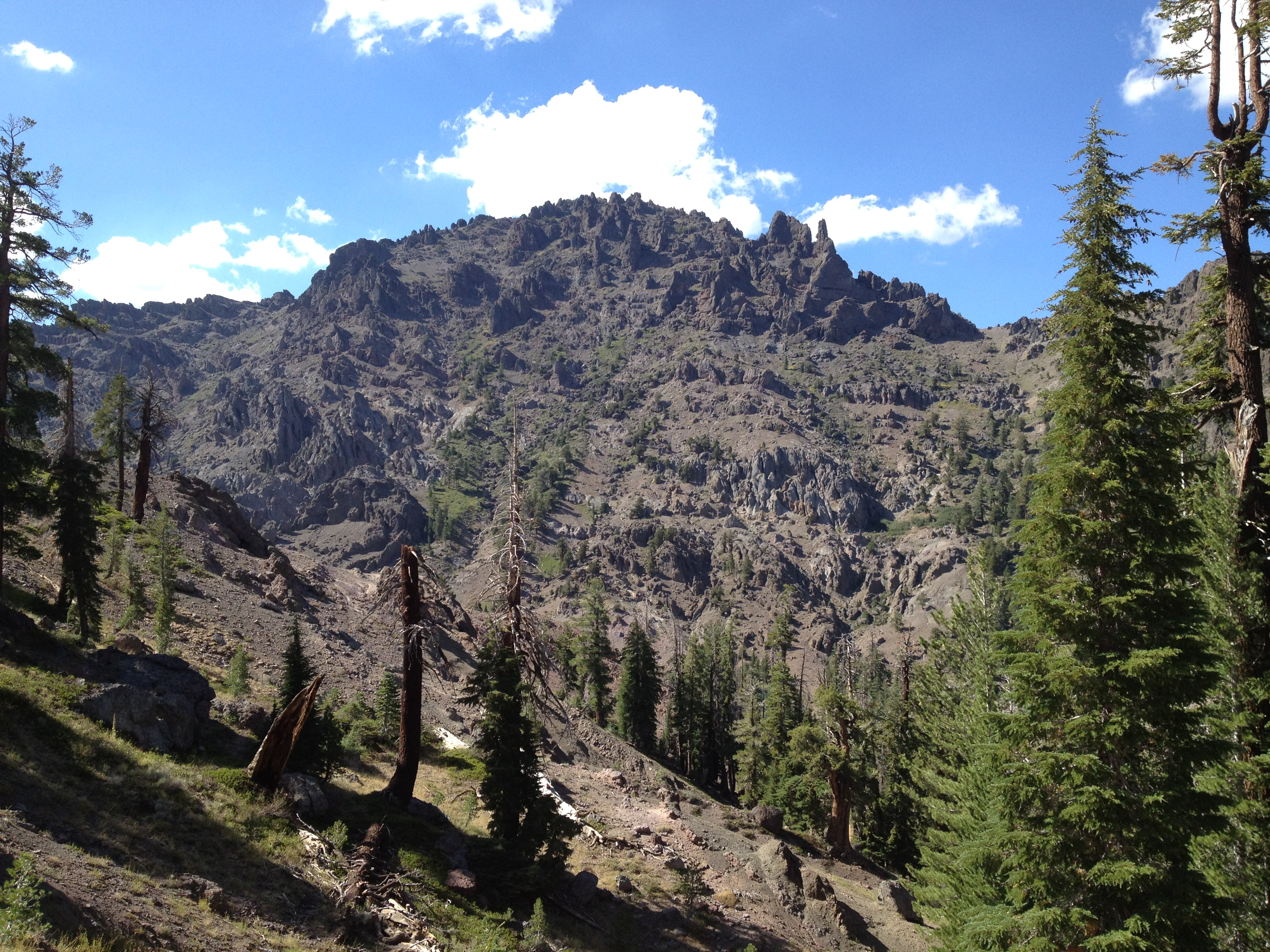
Southeast aspect

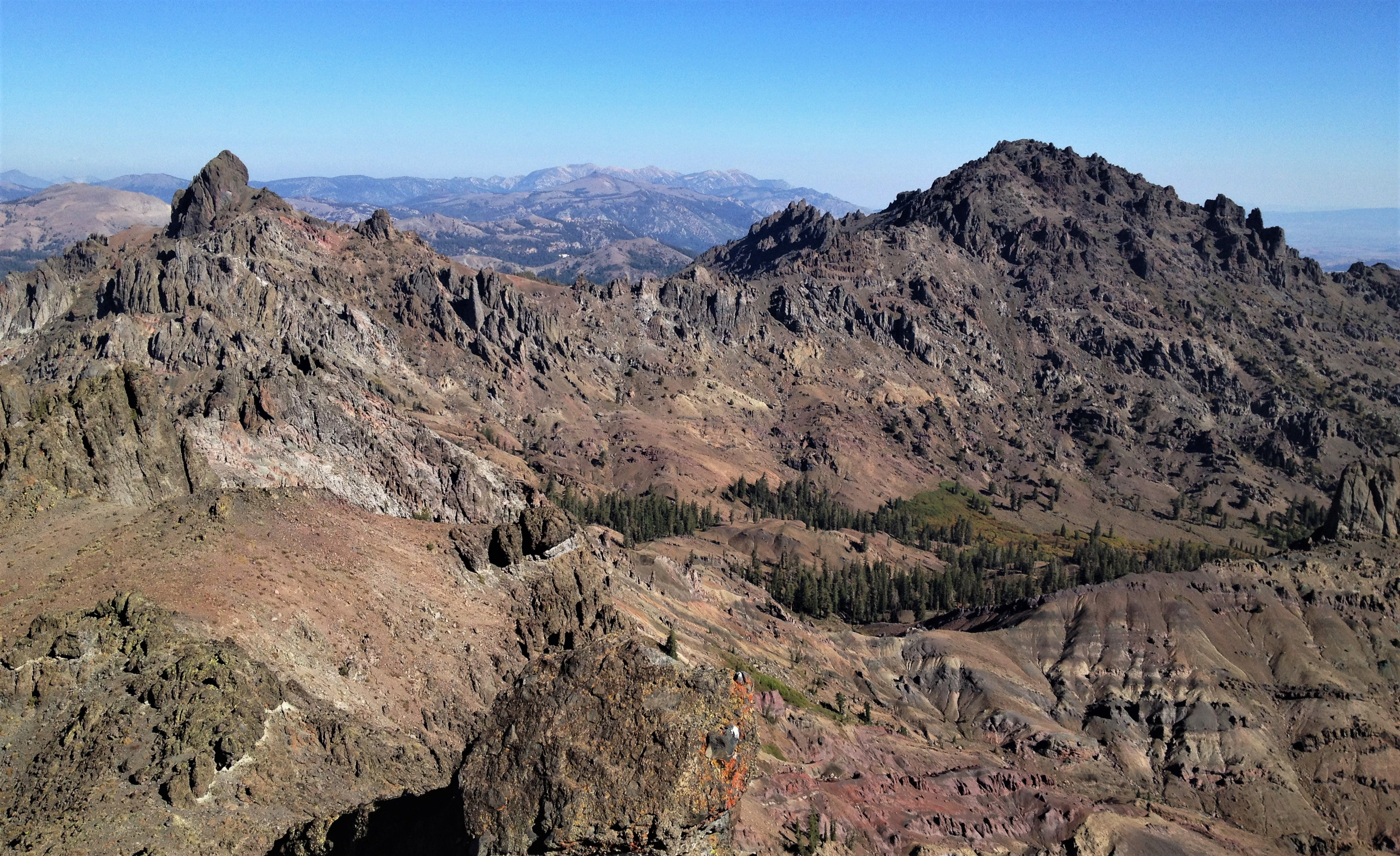
View north from Reynolds Peak, with Peak 9860 on left, Raymond Peak to right

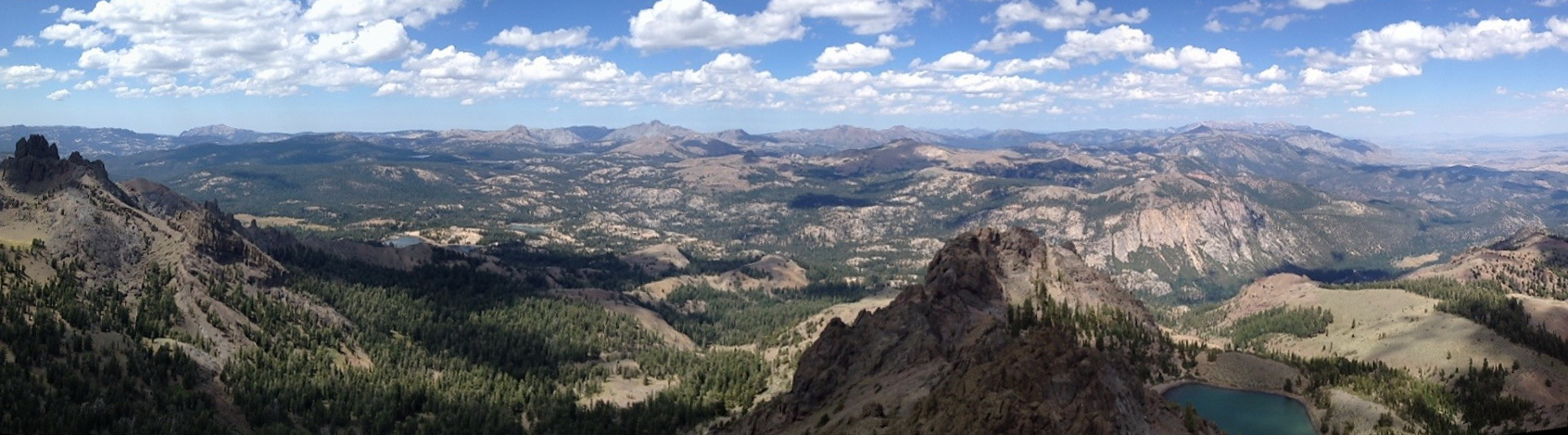
Summit panorama, camera pointed northwest

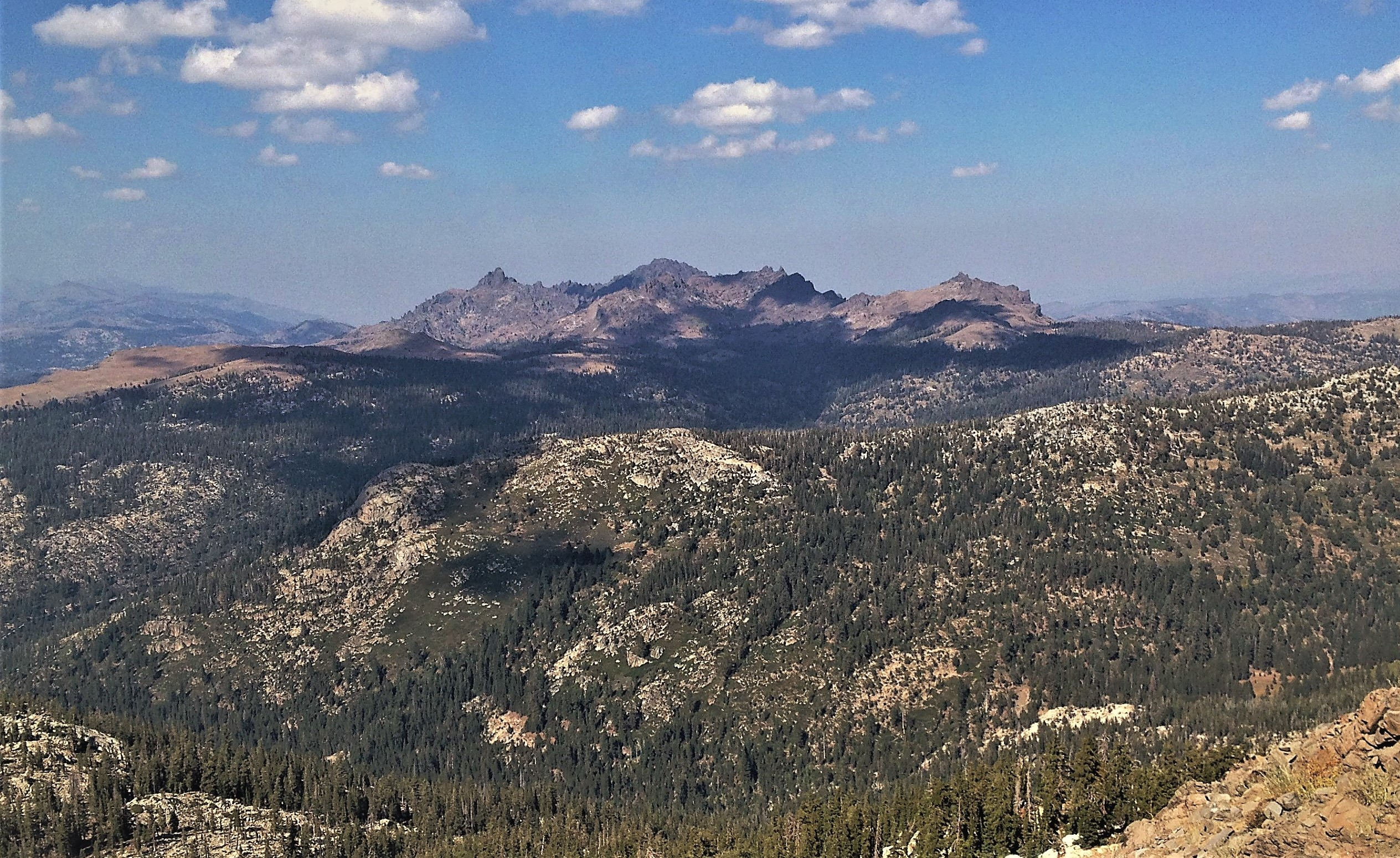
Raymond Peak is the highest point of the volcanic remnants in the distance
