= Reynolds Peak (California) =

Mountain in the American state of California

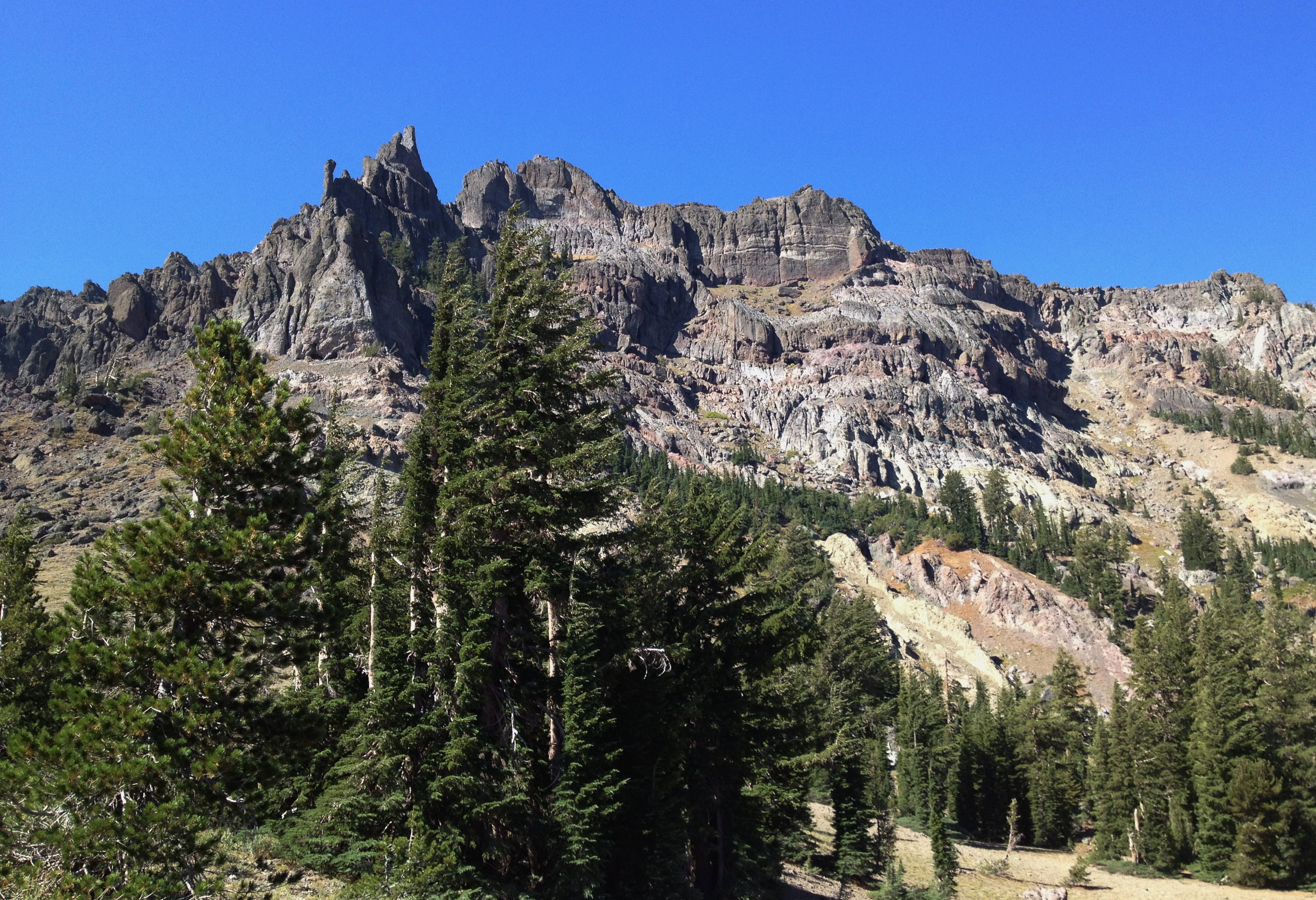
- Northeast aspect, from PCT

Highest point
- Elevation: 9,690 ft (2,954 m)
- Prominence: 760 ft (232 m)
- Parent peak: Peak 9860
- Isolation: 1.30 mi (2.09 km)
- Coordinates: 38°34′50″N 119°50′19″W

Naming
- Etymology: G. Elmer Reynolds.

Geography
- Location within California Location within the United States
- Location: Mokelumne Wilderness
- Country: United States
- State: California
- County: Alpine
- Parent range: Sierra Nevada
- Topo map: USGS Ebbetts Pass

Geology
- Rock age: Late Tertiary
- Rock type: Volcanic rock

Climbing
- Easiest route: class 3 scrambling

Reynolds Peak is a 9,690-foot-elevation (2,950-meter) mountain summit located in Alpine County, California, United States.

== Description ==
Reynolds Peak is set three miles (4.8 km) northwest of Ebbetts Pass in the Mokelumne Wilderness, on the common boundary that Humboldt–Toiyabe National Forest shares with Stanislaus National Forest. Reynolds Peak is situated on the crest of the Sierra Nevada mountain range, with precipitation runoff from the peak draining west to the North Fork Mokelumne River, and east into tributaries of the East Fork Carson River. Topographic relief is modest as the east aspect rises 1,100 feet (340 meters) above Raymond Meadows in one-half mile. Neighbors include Raymond Peak 1.7 miles (2.7 km) to the north and Highland Peak, 5.1 miles (8.2 km) southeast. The Pacific Crest Trail traverses the eastern base of the mountain, providing an approach option from Ebbetts Pass.

== Etymology ==
Reynolds in 1926

At the recommendation of the US Forest Service, this landform's toponym was officially adopted in 1929 by the U.S. Board on Geographic Names to honor Gilbert Elmer Reynolds (1884–1928), for many years the managing editor of the Stockton Record and an advocate of forest conservation. He was a member of the Sierra Club and one of California's leading conservationists.

== Climate ==
According to the Köppen climate classification system, Reynolds Peak is located in an alpine climate zone. Most weather fronts originate in the Pacific Ocean and travel east toward the Sierra Nevada mountains. As fronts approach, they are forced upward by the peaks (orographic lift), causing them to drop their moisture in the form of rain or snowfall onto the range.

== Gallery ==
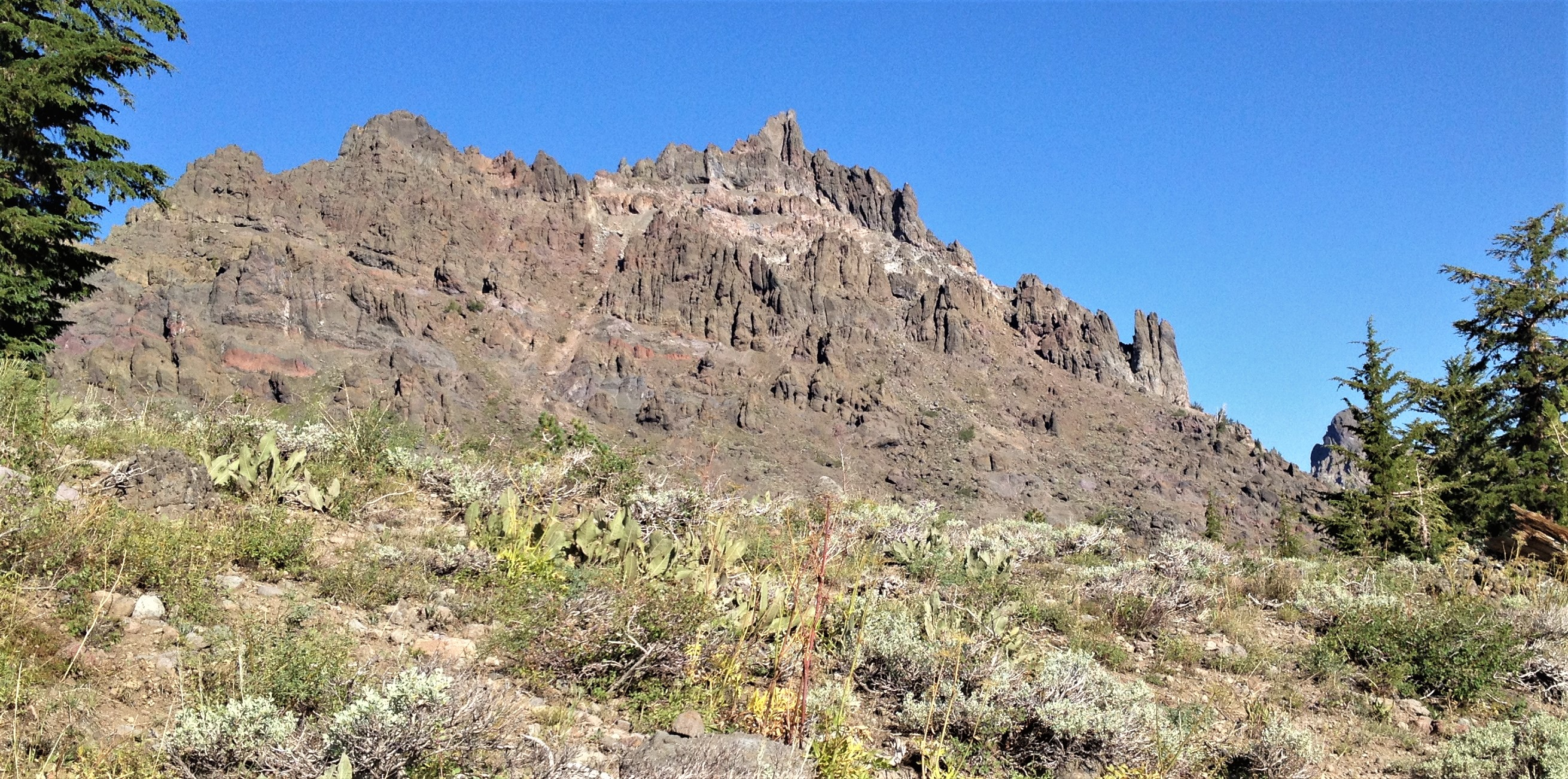
Southeast aspect from PCT

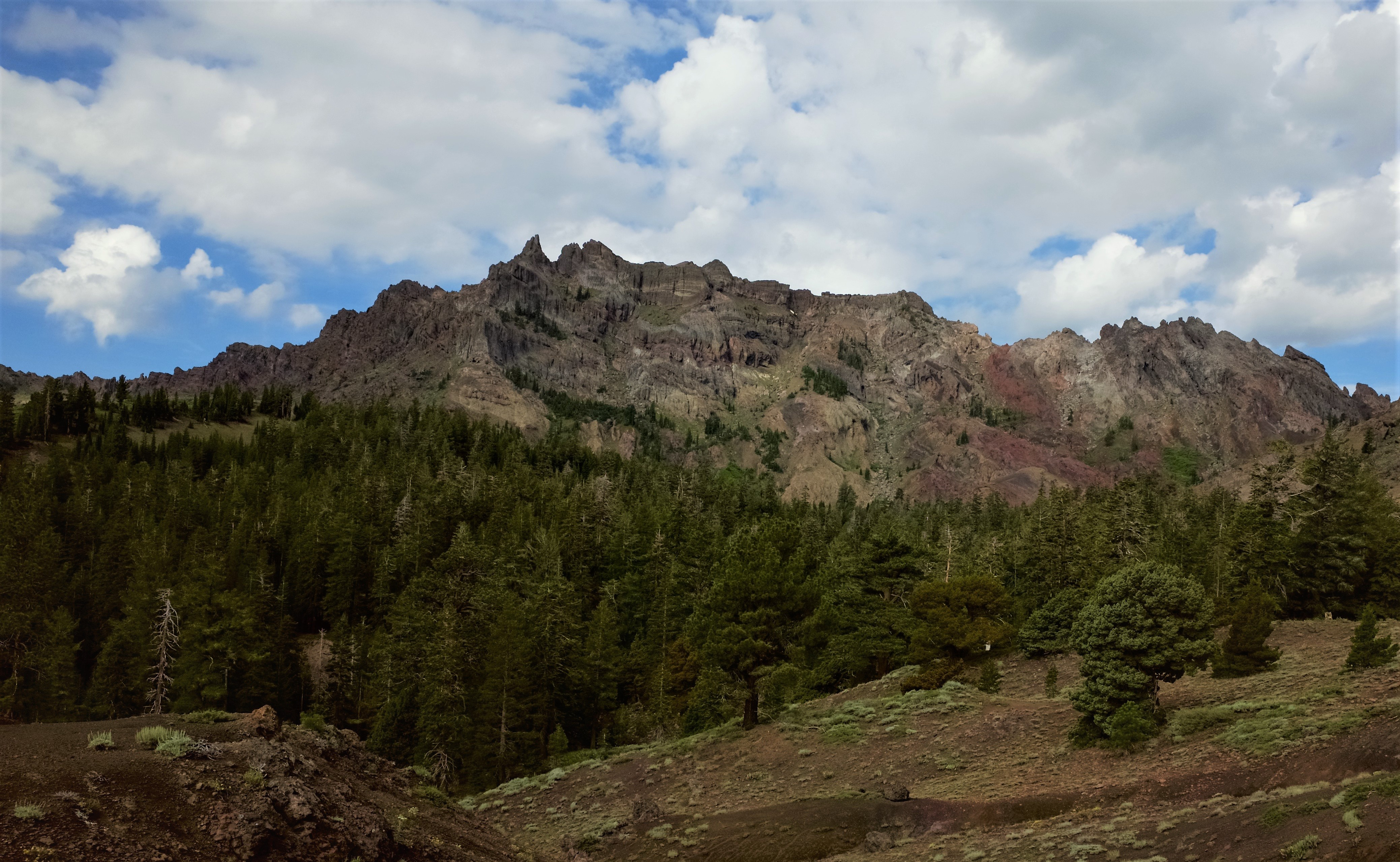
Northeast aspect

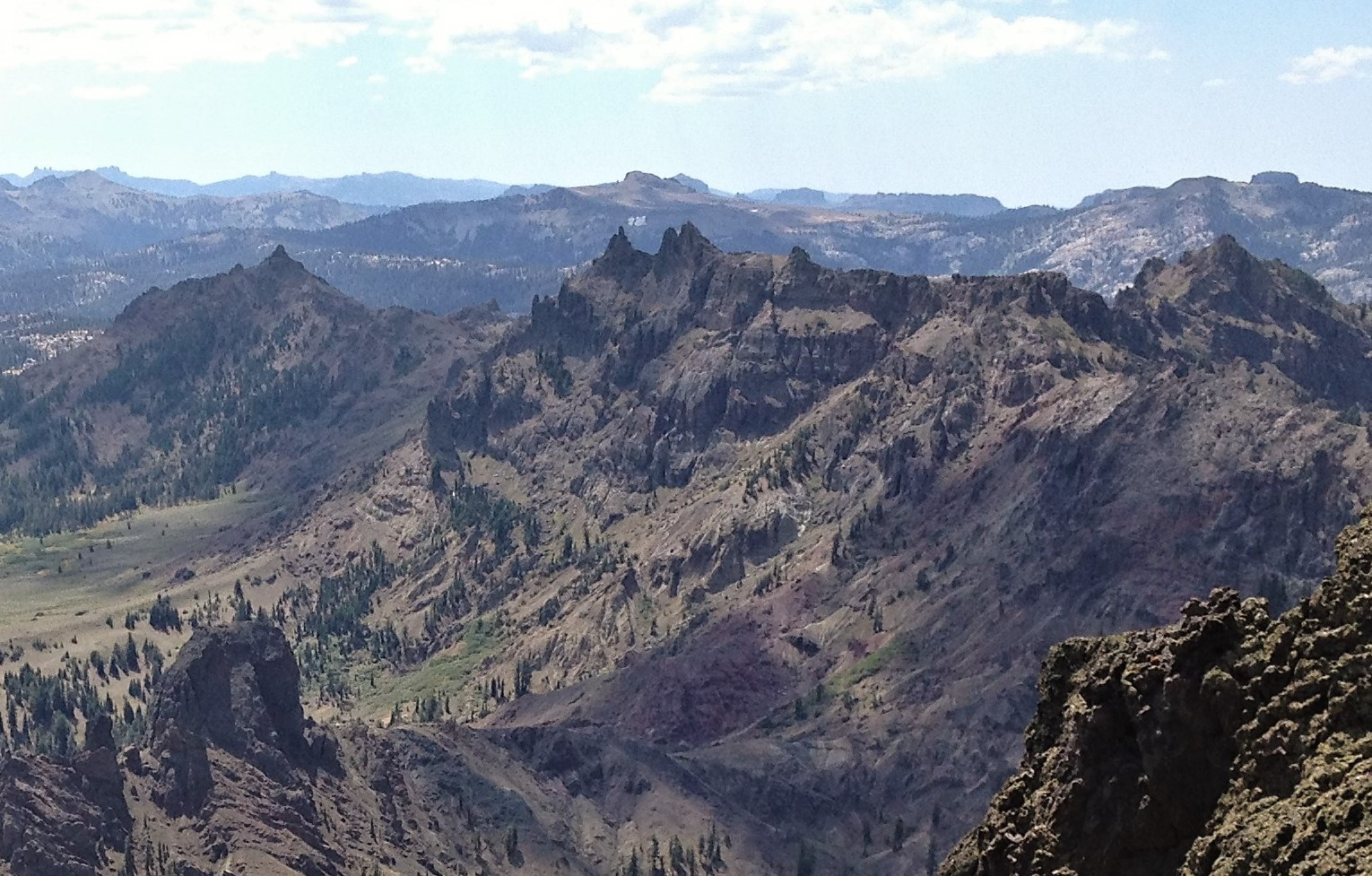
North aspect of Reynolds Peak seen from Raymond Peak

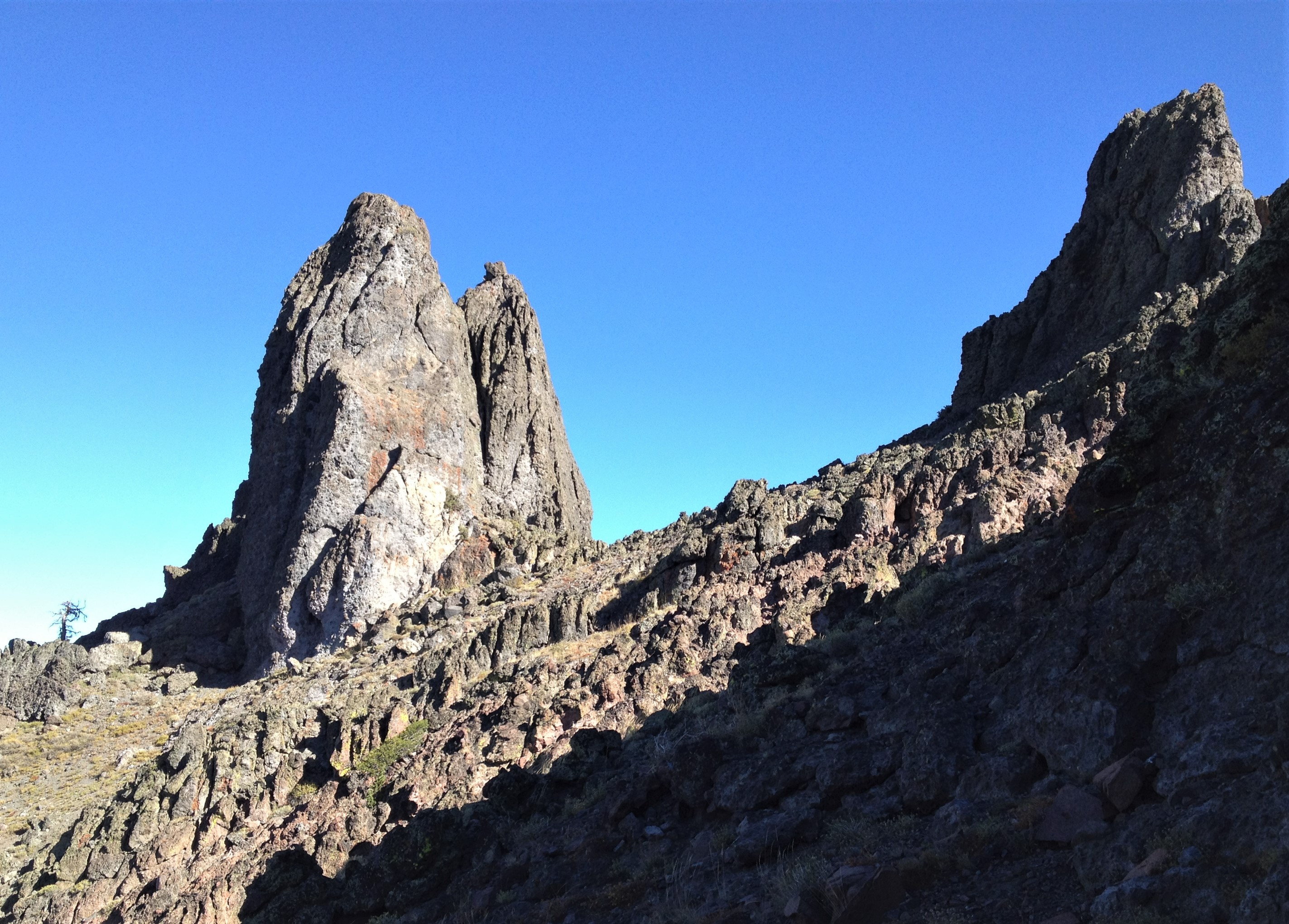
Summit pinnacle

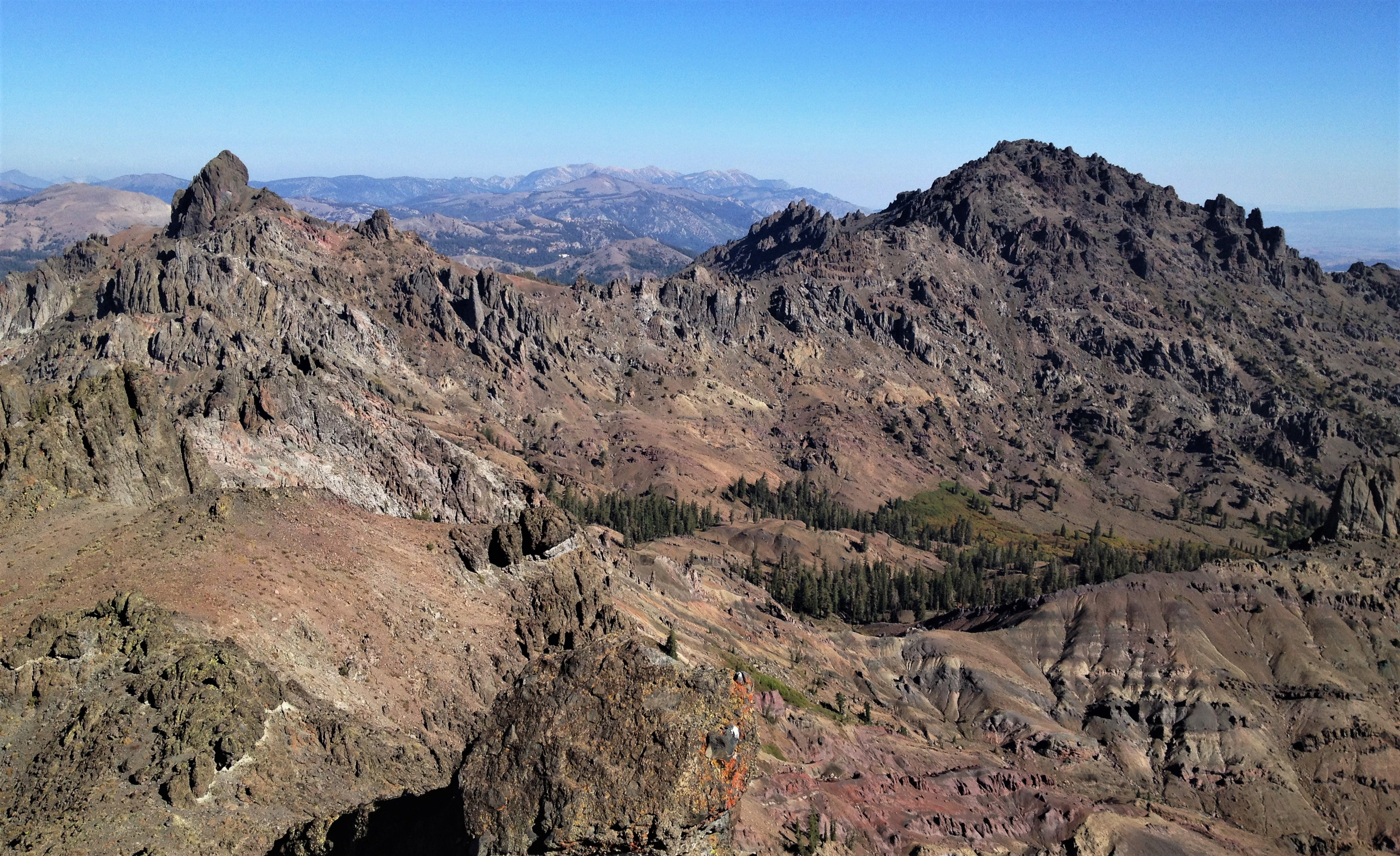
Looking north from the summit to line parent Peak 9860 on left, and Raymond Peak on the right.

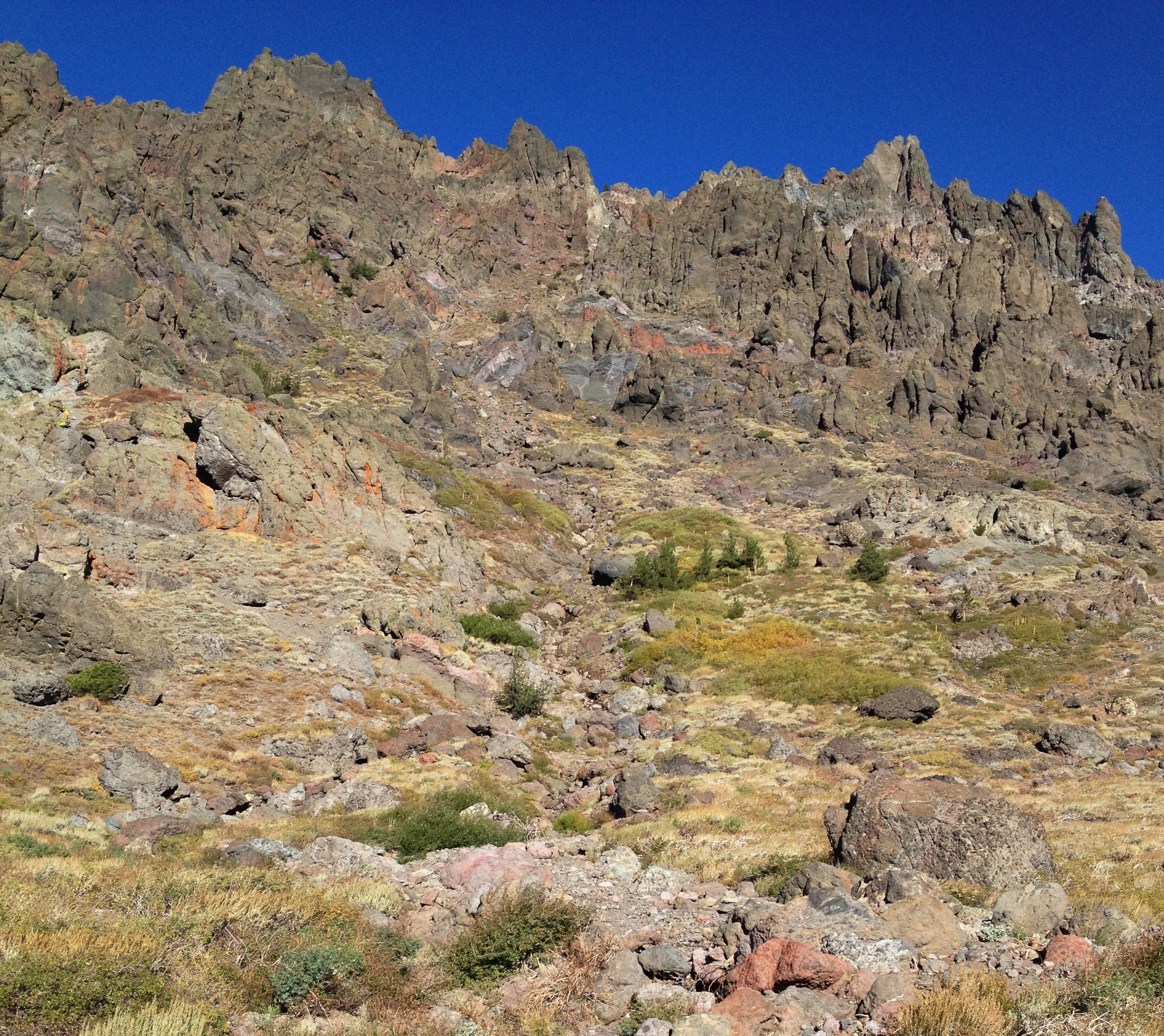
Volcanic rock of Reynolds Peak

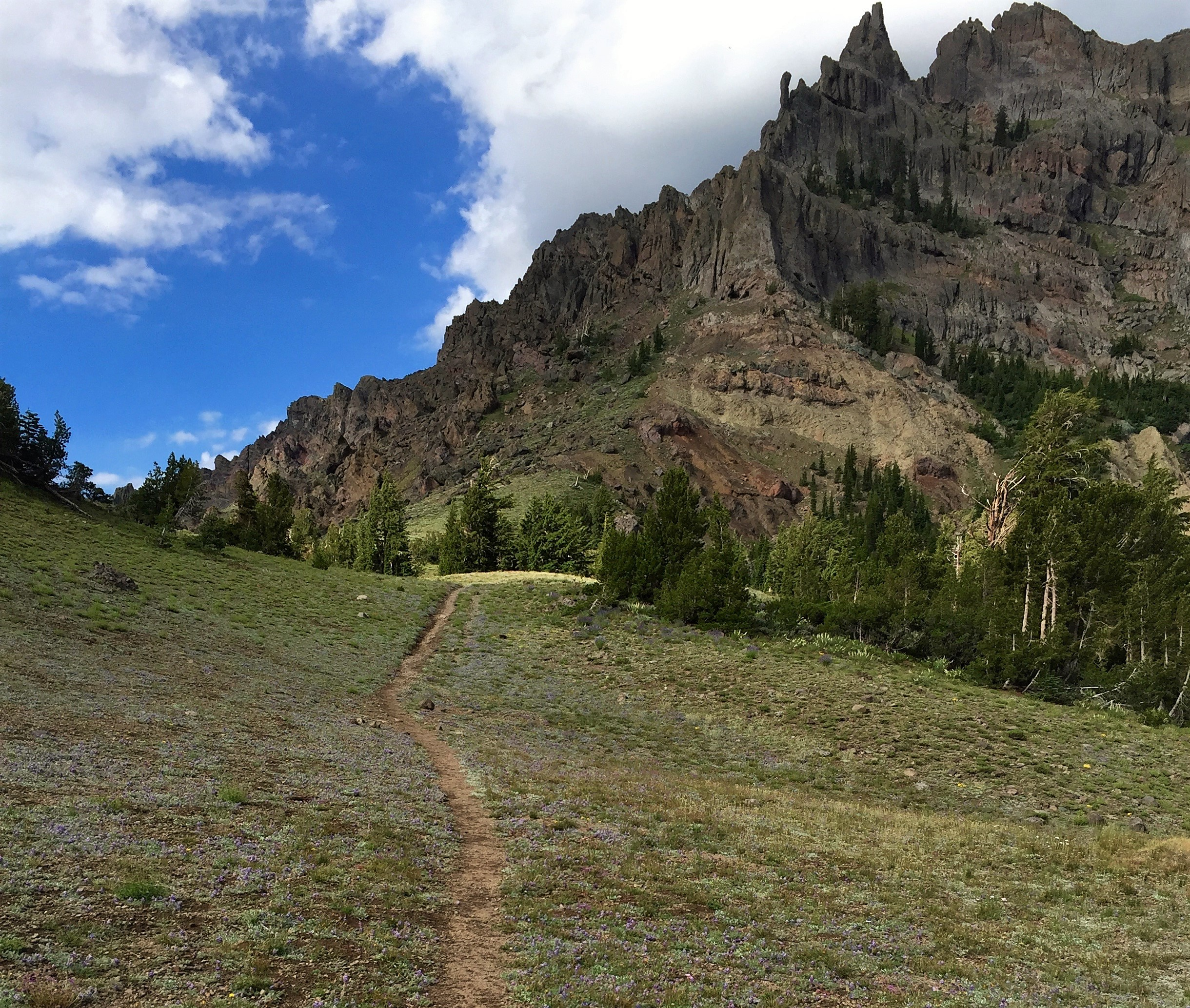
Pacific Crest Trail and Reynolds Peak

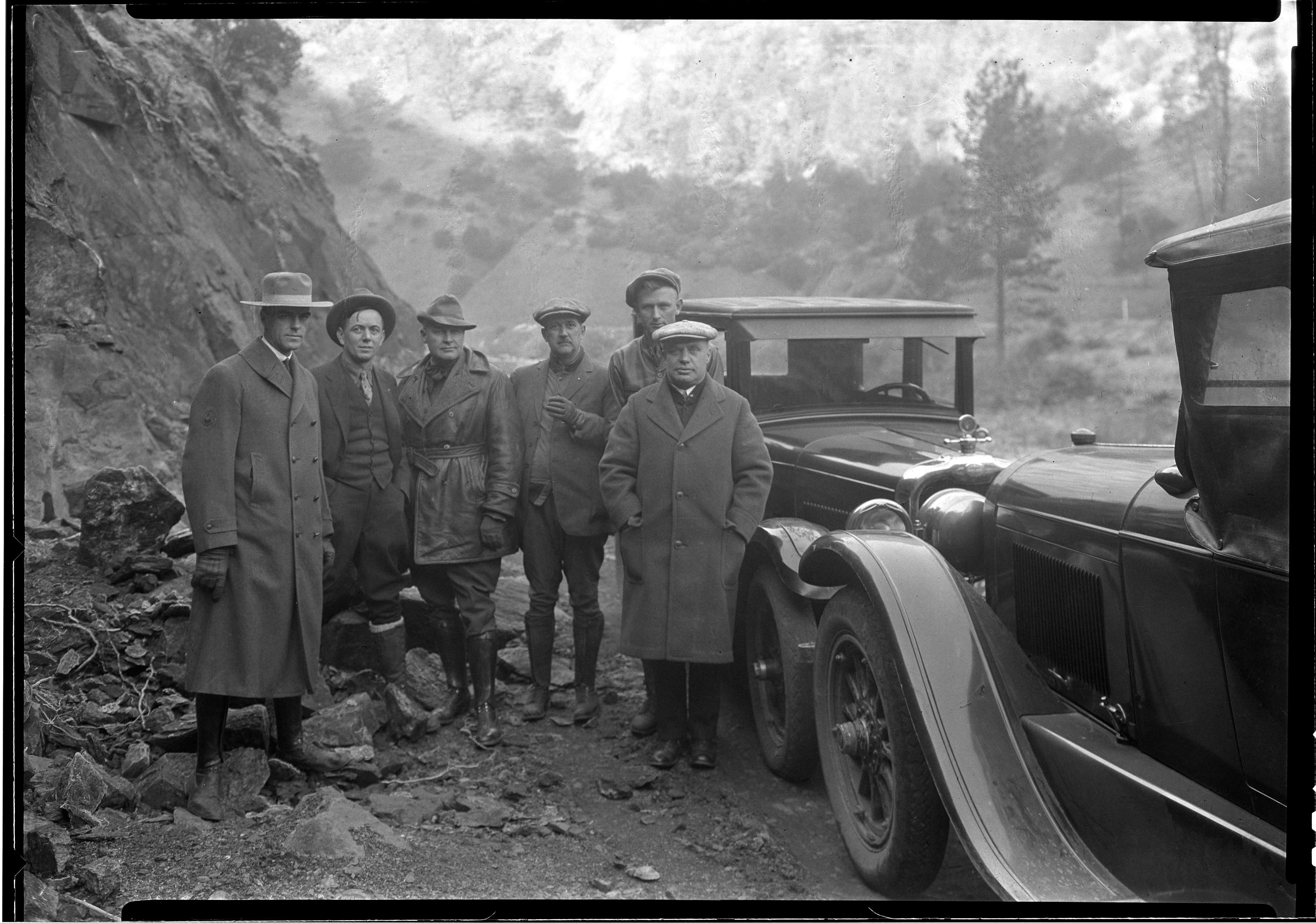
W. B. "Dusty" Lewis (Superintendent of Yosemite National Park) on the left, with G. Elmer Reynolds standing next to him.
