= Emma Eilers =

American painter

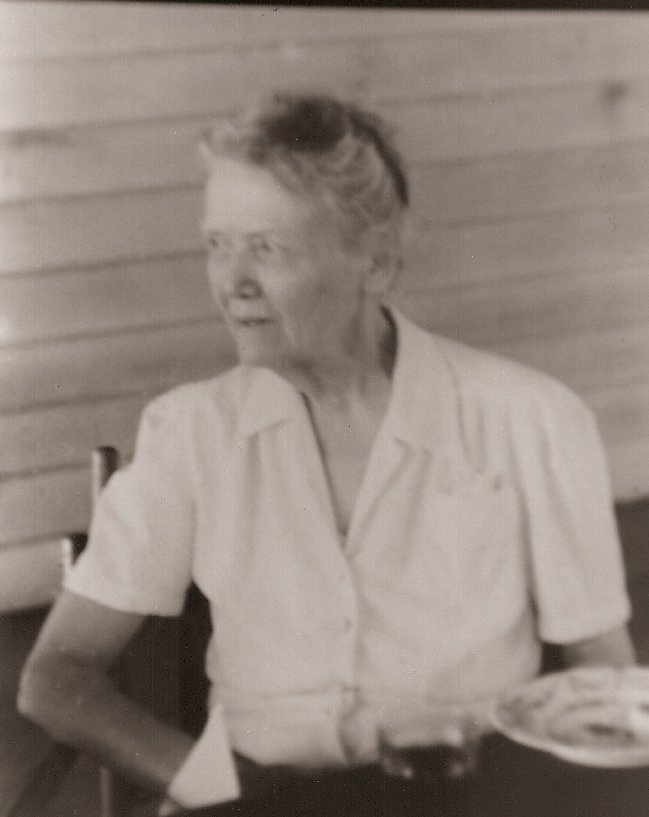
- Born: September 12, 1870
- Died: March 27, 1951 (aged 80)

Emma Eilers (September 12, 1870 – March 27, 1951) was an American painter from Sea Cliff, New York, who, despite her uncontrollable shakes, was recognized regionally for her work.

== Early years ==
Emma Eilers was born to parents Anton Eilers and Elizabeth (Emrich) Eilers September 12, 1870, in the town of Morrisania (now a neighborhood of the Bronx), becoming the 5th of 6 siblings. Census records suggest that during her first 10 years she spent most of her life in Morrisania, growing up amongst her family and German- American relatives who lived nearby.

Sometime between 1878 and 1881, her parents moved to Denver, Colorado, for a few years during which Anton became a successful mining engineer and smelter entrepreneur in the region, specifically in Leadville and Pueblo, Colorado. In the span of just a few years, she would see her family's life alter dramatically as the Eilers family accumulated great financial gains that allowed them to purchase multiple homes, travel more easily between New York and Colorado, and now travel between Germany and the US.

Unlike her oldest sister Else, who would graduate from Denver High School in 1883 or her brother Karl who graduated from the Brooklyn Polytechnic Institute in 1884, Emma joined her three sisters (Louise, Anna & Meta) whom all graduated from the Packer Collegiate Institute, with Emma obtaining her diploma on June 12, 1889.

== Adult life ==
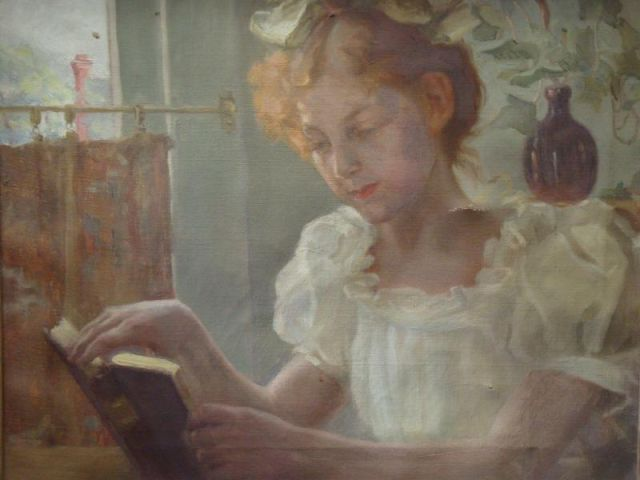
This painting is called 'Girl in White Reading a Book'. It is a good example of her portrait work.

Given her father's success, Emma was able to pursue her interest in art at her leisure. In 1889, around the time of her graduation from high school, she co-founded the Club Women of New York, which later became the National Association of Women Artists (NAWA). Founding members included Adele Bedell, Anita Ashley, one of the early presidents, and Olive Brown, Matilda De Cordoba, Ethel Prellwitz, Elizabeth Watrous, Fanny Tewksbury, Elizabeth Cheever and, of course, Emma Eilers.

In late 1892, she travelled with the entire family to visit relatives in Germany as part of her sister Anna's wedding to Hans Weber. This is her only known international trip.

At some point during the 1890s, Emma studied at the Shinnecock Hills Summer School of Art, which was the first important summer art school in America devoted to En plein air painting or painting outdoors. This is the only verified time she attended an art school.

By the late 1890s, Emma seems to have become a skilled artist. For example, in 1897, the Brooklyn Eagle reported that "Miss Eilers of St.Marks avenue does some of the strongest and best work at the league. Her painting of the figure is fine, unsurpassed by any other attendant of the famous art school ...". Later in the year, according to another Brooklyn Eagle Article, she was busy working "with mural and other designs. A composition having for its subject St.Francis D'Assisi and the Birds was one in which the drawing and color were excellent".

According to The New York Times, in 1899 one of her paintings was one of several Art Students' League of New York pieces exhibited at a Paris Exposition, which was then presented as a permanent exhibit at the Musee Pedagogique. During the winter of 1899, Emma was painting out of Miss Kate Dow's studio, in the 'Bank Building', where regular art shows were held, as Kate had just traveled to Paris.

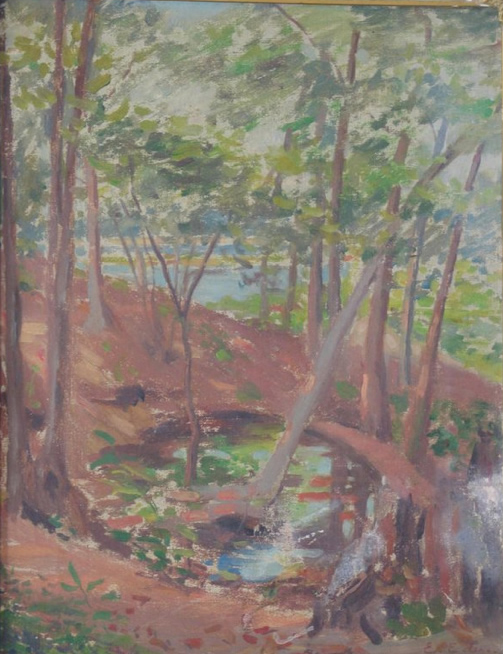
This landscape painting does not have a name, but is very representative of her landscape style and use of color.

From the 1890s through the 1920s she and three of her sisters lived, unmarried, with their father and mother, splitting time between homes in Brooklyn, NY, and Sea Cliff, NY. Music was a big part of the family's life, with her oldest sister Else a 'fine' pianist, according to several new articles and her sister Meta an excellent violinist. By 1898, the 'Misses Eilers' would host every Monday afternoon Sight Reading Class of 20 women, which the Brooklyn Eagle described as 'the latest novelty in the Hill society'. At least some of this love of music likely was the result of Emma's brother Karl Eilers marrying Leonie Wurlitzer, daughter of the founder of the Wurlitzer Company, Rudolph Wurlitzer. Whether Emma played any instruments or actively participated in music with her sisters is unknown.

Between 1918 and 1921, both Emma's mother and father, along with sisters Louise and Meta, would die, though Emma still had her oldest sister Else living at Sea Cliff along with her brother, Karl, and his wife and 3 kids nearby.

It's unknown how early Emma developed physical shakes that the family called her 'palsy', but several first-hand accounts describe how her brush would shake right up to the point where brush met canvas and then, suddenly, smooth strokes would appear. Dinner time was also a slightly unusual experience for visitors as Emma's 'shakes' would cause the table to shake at times, rattling silverware, plates and glasses.

While Emma's work is not generally well known, she did paint regularly in her large studio at Sea Cliff until her death on March 27, 1951. Her studio has since been converted into a house and still exists. Emma was the last of her 6 siblings to die, dying at her Sea Cliff home that was the Eilers family home for more than 5 decades.

At the time of her death, relatives report that her studio was full of paints of various sizes, "they were laying everywhere". Some of her paintings passed down to relatives, some have recently appeared at auction, but most appear to have been destroyed.
