= Stanislaus Peak =

Mountain in California, United States

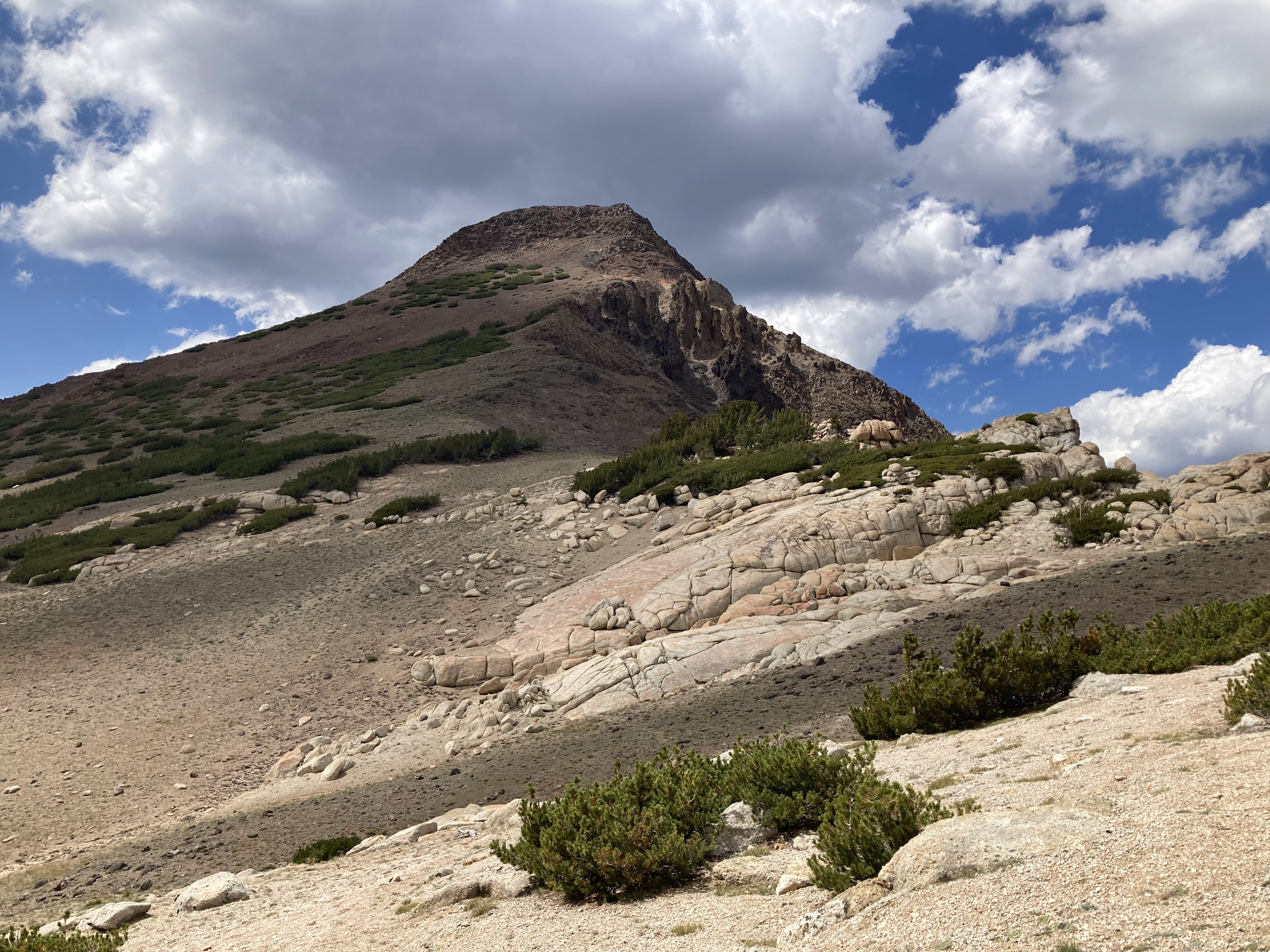
- Southeastern face of Stanislaus Peak

Highest point
- Elevation: 11,233 ft (3,424 m)
- Prominence: 833 ft (254 m)
- Listing: Mountains of California
- Coordinates: 38°23′3″N 119°40′2″W

Geography
- Location within California
- Location: Alpine and Mono counties, California, U.S.
- Parent range: Sierra Nevada
- Topo map: USGS

Climbing
- Easiest route: off trail hike, Simple scramble, class 2

Stanislaus Peak is a prominent peak near Sonora Pass in the Sierra Nevada range in California, United States. It is located in the Carson–Iceberg Wilderness in the federally-managed Stanislaus National Forest.

== Geology ==
Stanislaus peak is an ancient volcanic cone composed of andesite intrusion. Near the base of the mountain is a granite outcropping formed during the Late Triassic to Late Cretaceous periods. The granite features are also found in nearby areas, such as Yosemite National Park and the Emigrant Wilderness.

== Hiking ==
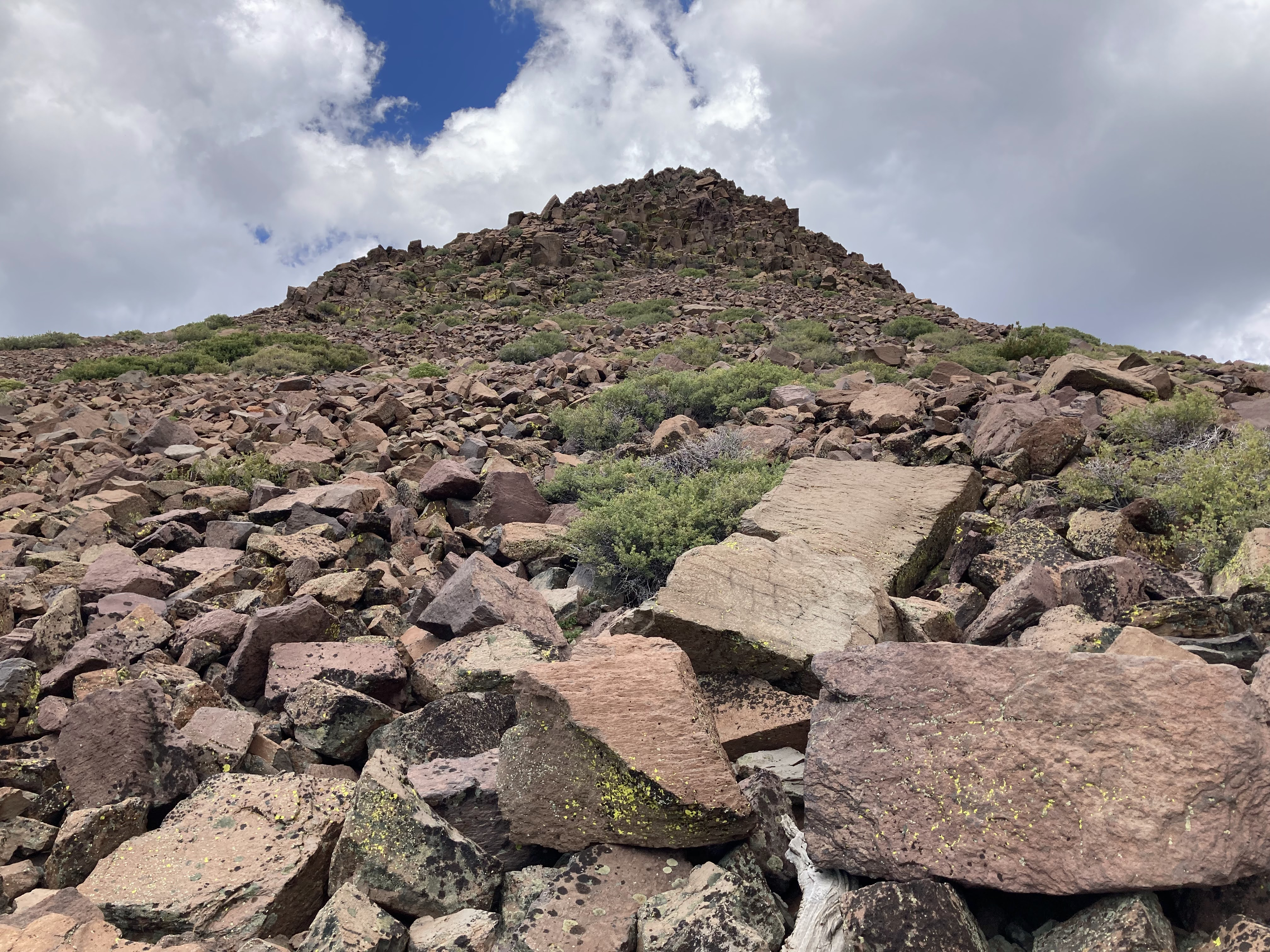
The simple, non-technical scramble to the summit of Stanislaus Peak in California

The peak can be hiked via the trail from Saint Mary's Pass near Sonora Pass. The trail ends at the granite outcropping just below the peak and route finding and a class 2 scramble is required to reach the summit via the easiest approach from the southeast face.
