= Highland Peak (California) =

Mountain in California, United States

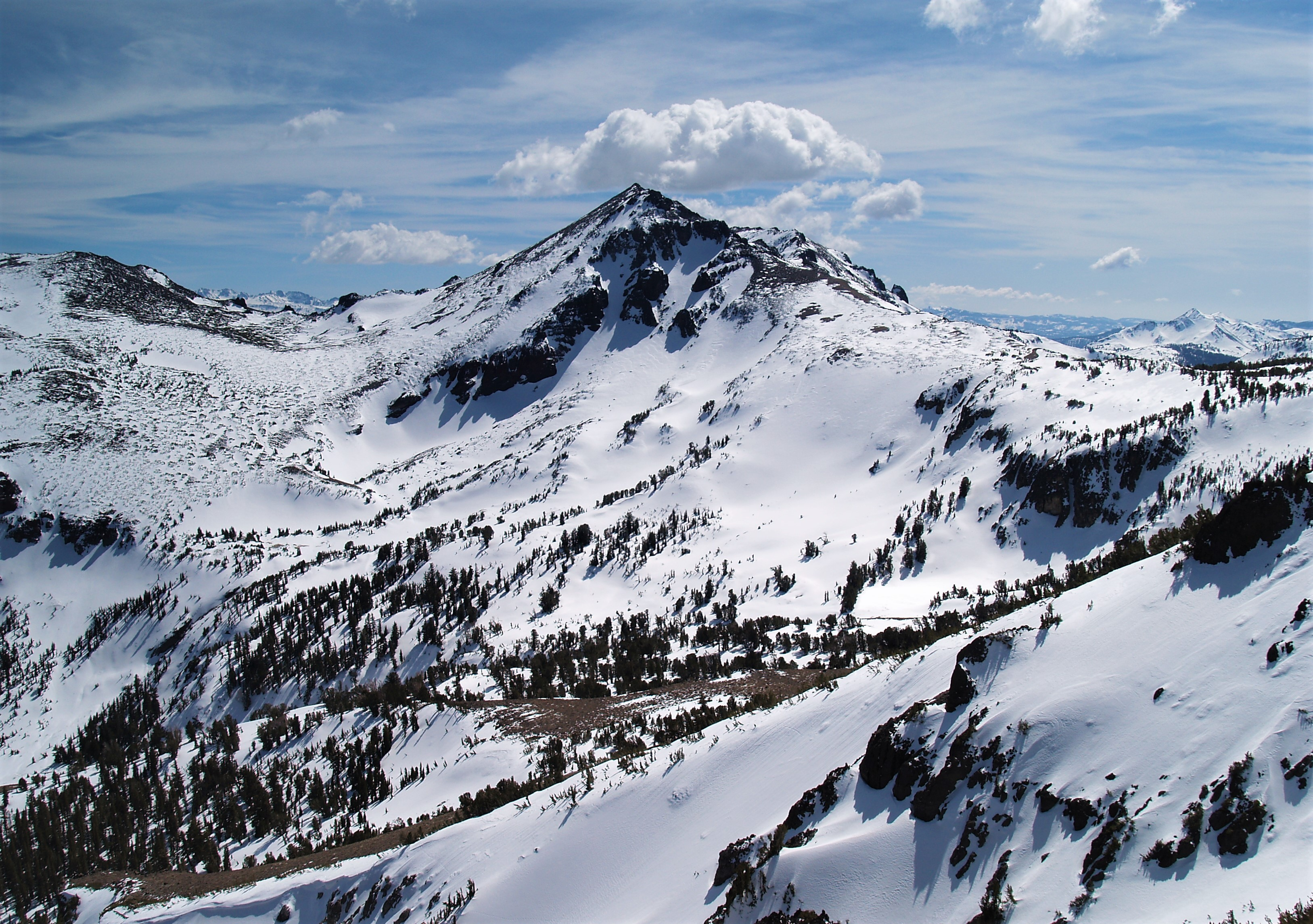
- Highland Peak, north aspect

Highest point
- Elevation: 10,936 ft (3,333 m)
- Prominence: 2,456 ft (749 m)
- Parent peak: Stanislaus Peak (11,233 ft)
- Isolation: 10.64 mi (17.12 km)
- Listing: Sierra Peaks Section; Major summits of California
- Coordinates: 38°32′37″N 119°45′20″W

Geography
- Location within California Location within the United States
- Country: United States
- State: California
- County: Alpine
- Protected area: Carson–Iceberg Wilderness
- Parent range: Sierra Nevada
- Topo map: USGS Ebbetts Pass

Geology
- Mountain type: Lava dome
- Rock type: Rhyolite

Climbing
- Easiest route: class 2

Highland Peak is a prominent 10,936-foot-elevation (3,333-meter) mountain summit located in the Sierra Nevada mountain range, in Alpine County of northern California, United States. It is situated 3.5 miles east of Ebbetts Pass in the Carson-Iceberg Wilderness, on land managed by Humboldt–Toiyabe National Forest. Although it ranks as the 680th-highest summit in California, it ranks 36th-highest of those with at least 500 meters of topographic prominence. Also, there is no higher peak than Highland Peak to the north within the Sierra Nevada. Highland Peak has a subsidiary South Peak (10,824 ft; 3,299 m), with one-half mile separation between summits. The Pacific Crest Trail traverses the western foot of this mountain, providing an approach option. Precipitation runoff from this mountain drains into tributaries of the East Fork Carson River. . Topographic relief is significant as the summit rises over 2,900 feet (884 meters) above Noble Canyon in 1.6 mile (2.6 km).

== History ==
This mountain's name was applied in 1878 by Lieutenant Montgomery M. Macomb during the Wheeler Survey. The name commemorates the short-lived Highland City, set on the high land between the Carson and Stanislaus watersheds. The mountain's name has been officially adopted by the United States Board on Geographic Names, and a brass USGS benchmark bearing the name was placed at the summit in 1956.

== Climate ==
According to the Köppen climate classification system, Highland Peak is located in an alpine climate zone. Most weather fronts originate in the Pacific Ocean, and travel east toward the Sierra Nevada mountains. As fronts approach, they are forced upward by the peaks, causing them to drop their moisture in the form of rain or snowfall onto the range (orographic lift).

Climate data for Highland Peak (CA) 38.5423 N, 119.7608 W, Elevation: 10,371 ft (3,161 m) (1991–2020 normals)
| Month | Jan | Feb | Mar | Apr | May | Jun | Jul | Aug | Sep | Oct | Nov | Dec | Year |
|---|---|---|---|---|---|---|---|---|---|---|---|---|---|
| Mean daily maximum °F (°C) | 33.1 (0.6) | 31.9 (−0.1) | 34.4 (1.3) | 38.2 (3.4) | 46.3 (7.9) | 56.4 (13.6) | 65.4 (18.6) | 64.8 (18.2) | 58.8 (14.9) | 49.0 (9.4) | 38.8 (3.8) | 32.8 (0.4) | 45.8 (7.7) |
| Daily mean °F (°C) | 24.1 (−4.4) | 22.3 (−5.4) | 24.4 (−4.2) | 27.3 (−2.6) | 34.8 (1.6) | 43.9 (6.6) | 51.9 (11.1) | 51.2 (10.7) | 45.6 (7.6) | 37.3 (2.9) | 29.3 (−1.5) | 24.0 (−4.4) | 34.7 (1.5) |
| Mean daily minimum °F (°C) | 15.1 (−9.4) | 12.7 (−10.7) | 14.3 (−9.8) | 16.4 (−8.7) | 23.2 (−4.9) | 31.3 (−0.4) | 38.4 (3.6) | 37.6 (3.1) | 32.4 (0.2) | 25.6 (−3.6) | 19.8 (−6.8) | 15.2 (−9.3) | 23.5 (−4.7) |
| Average precipitation inches (mm) | 9.65 (245) | 8.20 (208) | 8.13 (207) | 4.95 (126) | 3.02 (77) | 1.14 (29) | 0.67 (17) | 0.52 (13) | 0.91 (23) | 3.04 (77) | 5.18 (132) | 9.21 (234) | 54.62 (1,388) |
Source: PRISM Climate Group

== See also ==
- List of the major 3000-meter summits of California
- List of mountain peaks of California

== Gallery ==
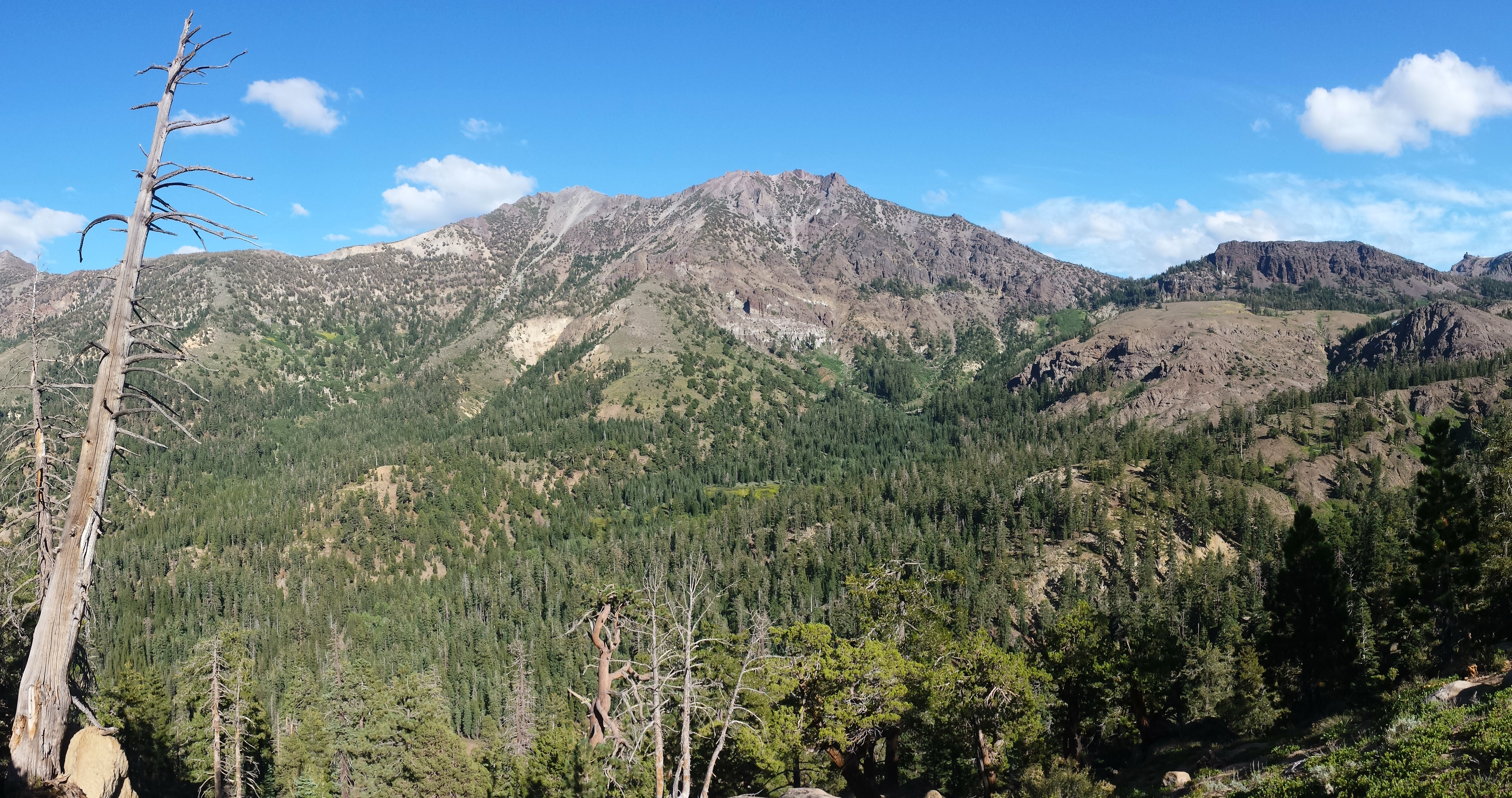
West aspect

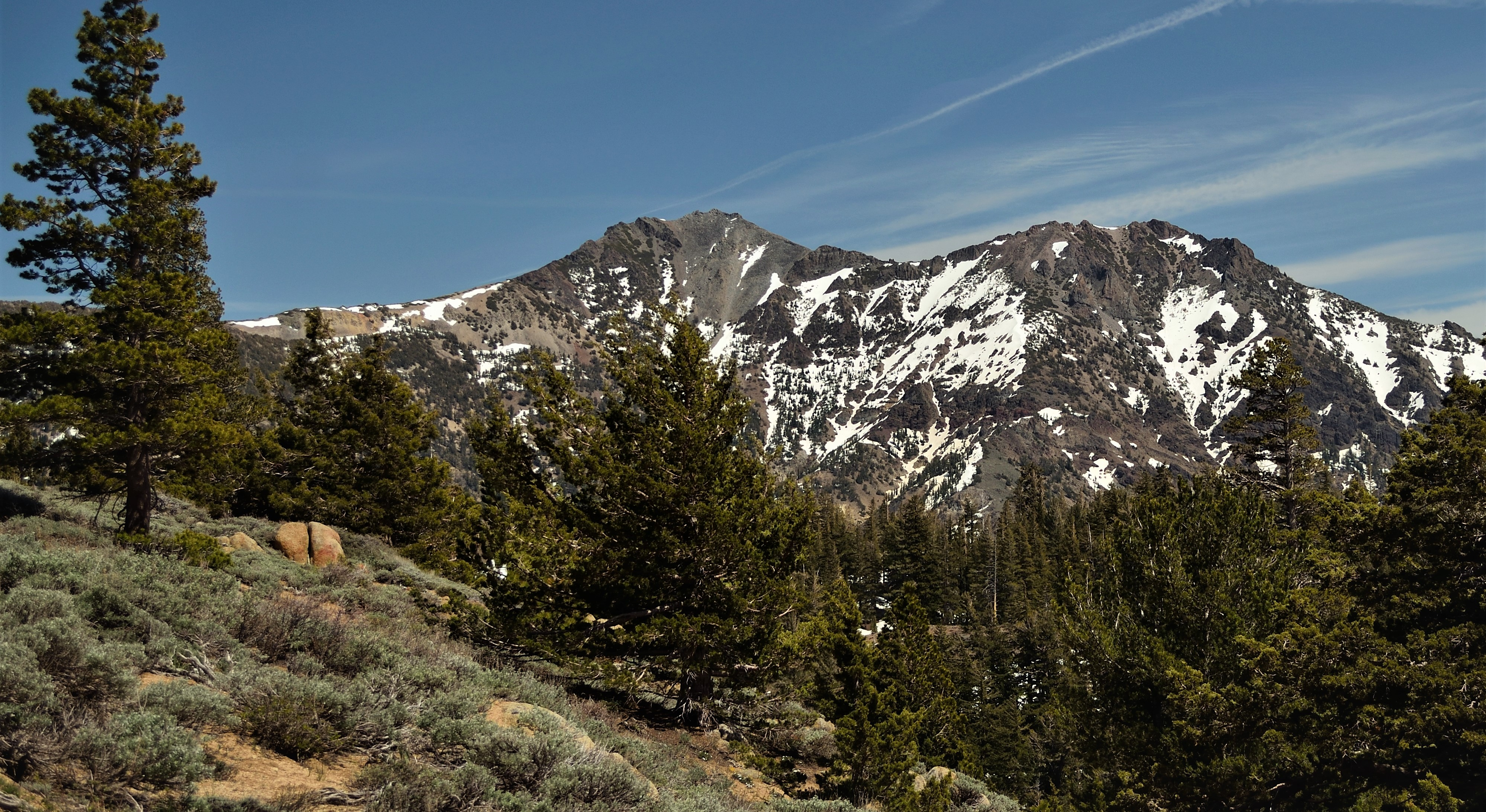
West aspect from Ebbetts Pass area

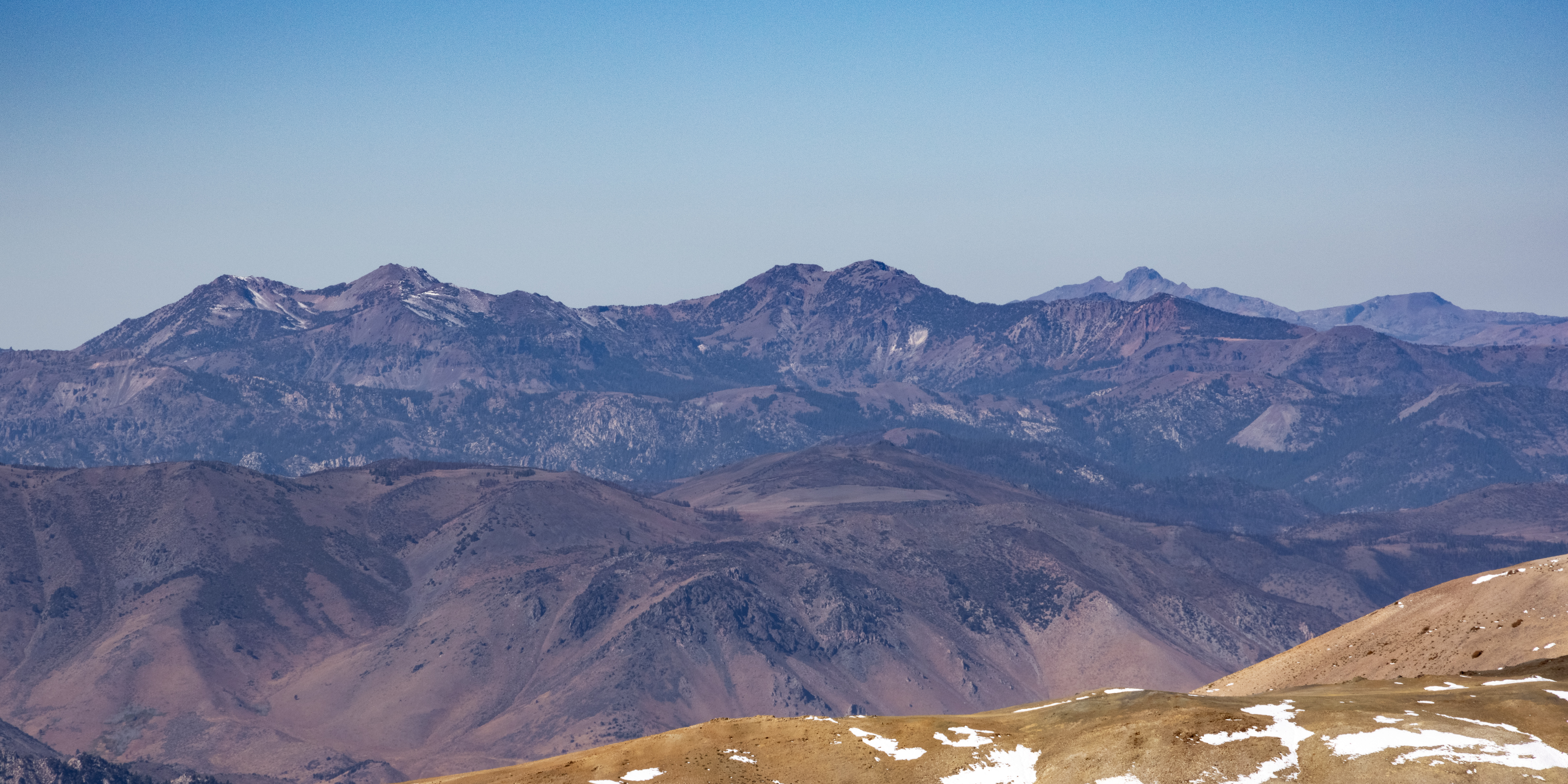
Highland Peak (left), Silver Peak (center), and Round Top (right)

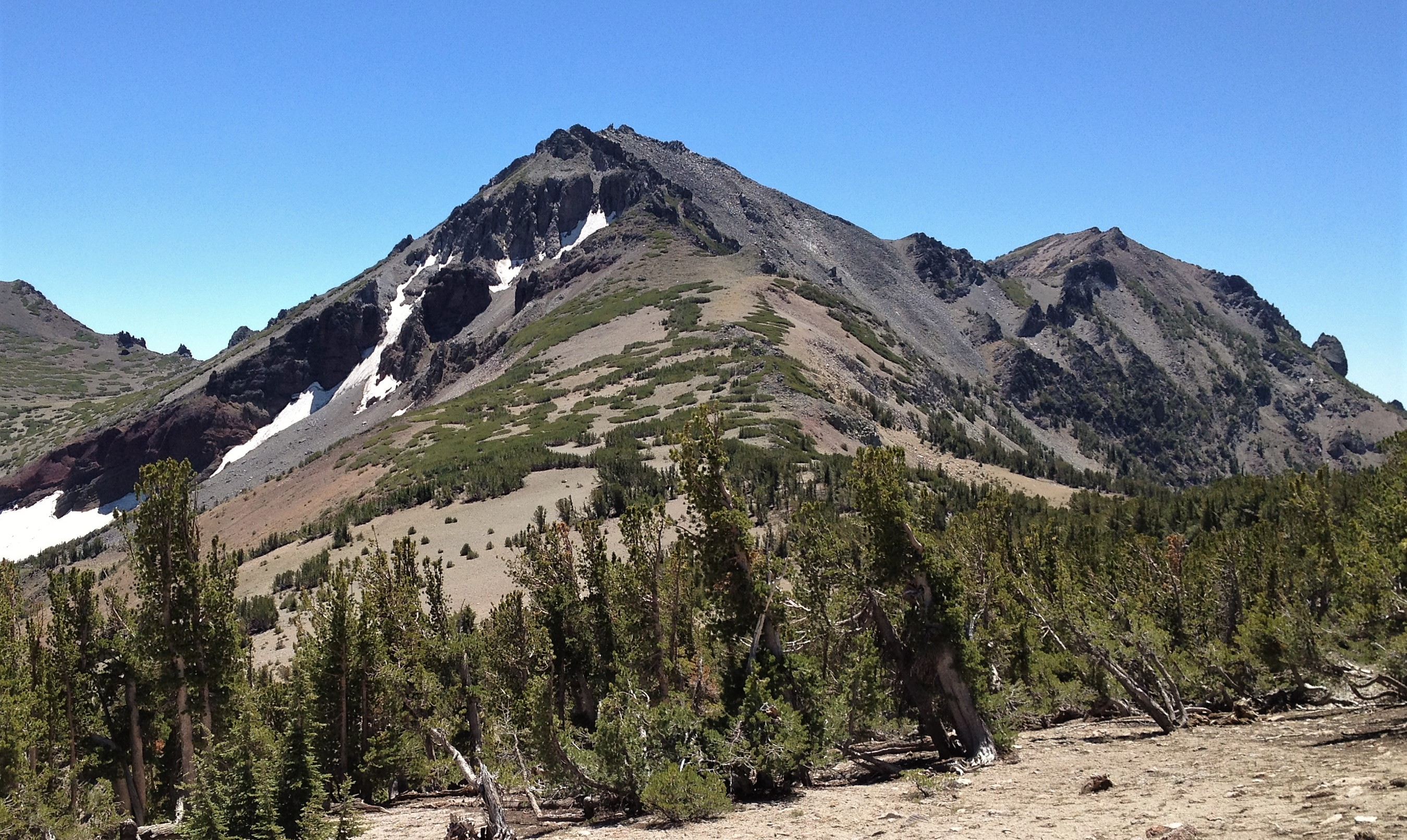
from NNW

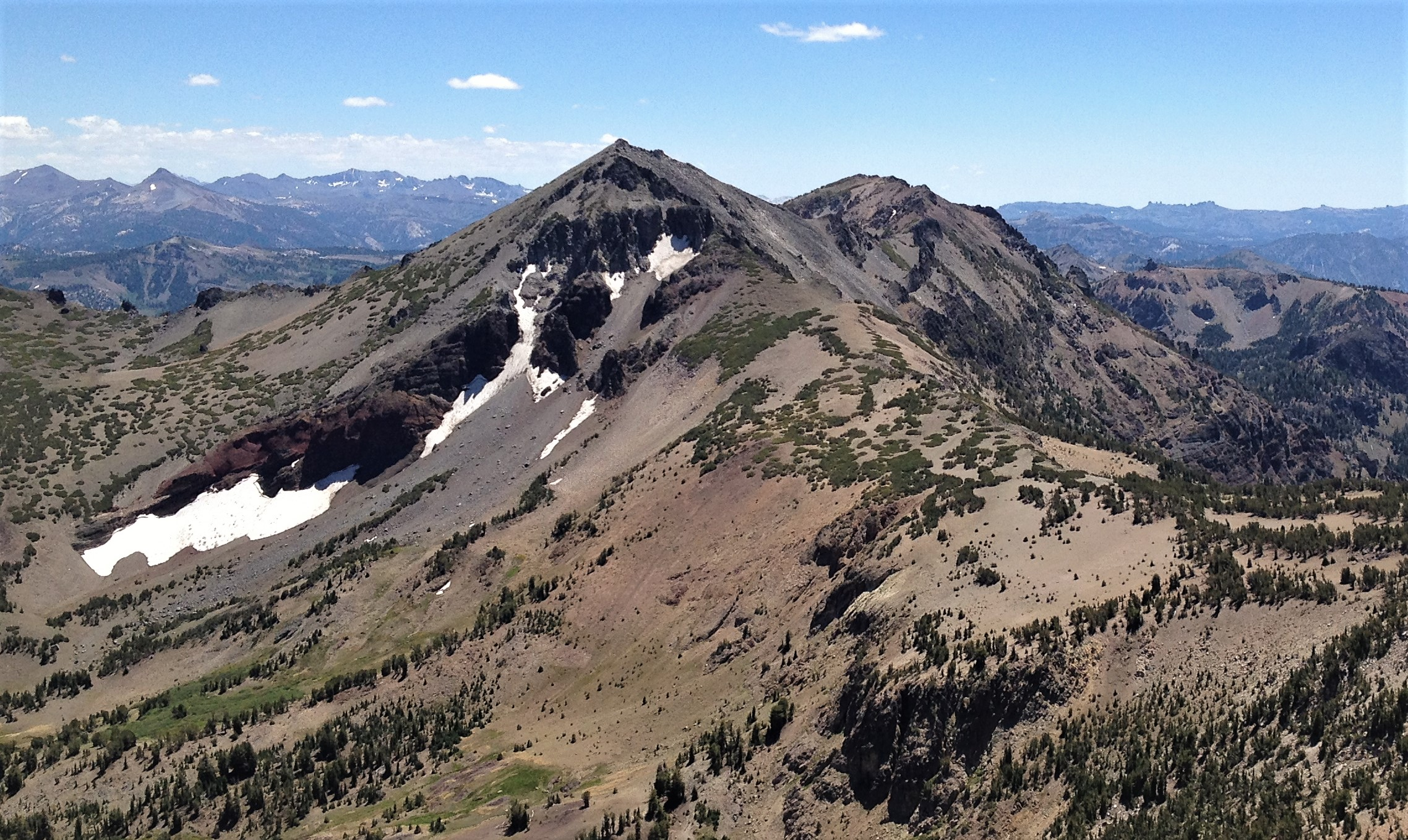
from Silver Peak

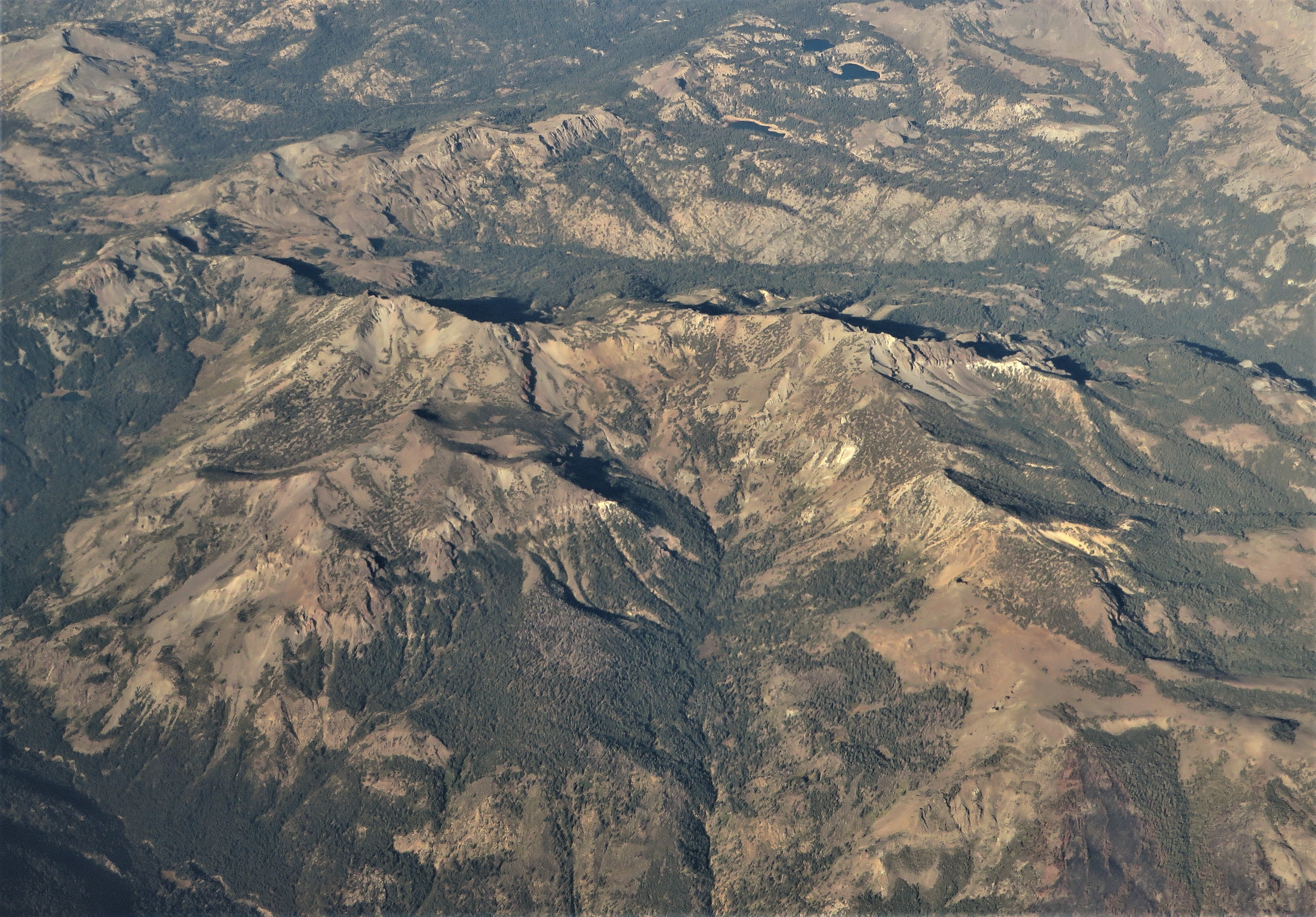
Aerial view looking west at Highland Peak (left) and Silver Peak (right)
