= Anton Eilers =

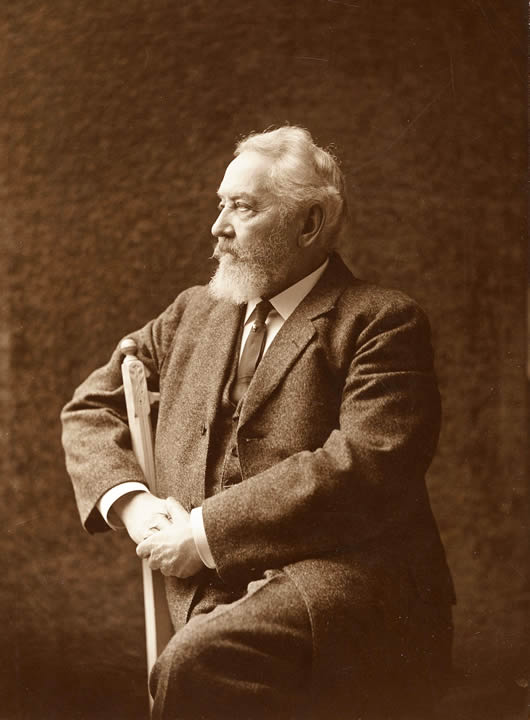

Frederic Anton Eilers (14 January 1839 – 22 April 1917) was an American metallurgist and smelting and refining entrepreneur who co-founded the American Smelting and Refining Company, known today as ASARCO.

== Early years ==
Frederic Anton Eilers was born in Laufenselden, Nassau, Germany, Jan 14, 1839, to Ernest Julius Adolph Friederich and Elizabeth Dielmann Eilers. He grew up in the farming community of Mensfelden in the Duchy of Nassau, then attended the German High Schools of Weilburg and Wiesbaden. In 1856 he spent one year at the Clausthal mining academy and two at the University of Göttingen. Shortly after his graduation from college in 1859, he, his mother, and his twelve-year-old sister Emma left for the United States.

== Early work ==
In 1863, he married Elizabeth Emrich. Soon after, Eilers was offered a position with Adelberg & Raymond, a partnership between Justus Adelberg and Rossiter W. Raymond that specialized in mining consulting. He worked there three years, learning about the American mining industry while becoming a close friend of Rossiter Raymond. A year later, Anton's first child, daughter Else, was born. The next year, in 1865, while Anton was on assignment for Adelberg & Raymond in Marietta, Ohio, boring for oil, his son Karl Eilers was born.

In 1866, following the Civil War, Anton secured a position as manager of the Hale Copper mine in Hillsville in Carroll County, Virginia. There, he restarted the copper mine, built a copper smelter, and experimented with copper refining. During the Eilers' time in Virginia, Anton & Elizabeth had two more children, Anna and Louise. In 1869, Anton developed plans to expand the Hale Copper mine, but a lack of experienced labor and the low quality of copper ore proved difficult obstacles for growth. In August of that year, Eilers appeared ready to work through the challenges in Virginia, as the family bought property near the copper mine. However, a few weeks later, Rossiter W. Raymond offered Anton a new position back in New York. Raymond had been appointed Commissioner of Mines and Mining Statistics In and West of the Rocky Mountains and wanted Eilers as deputy commissioner. Anton accepted the offer and moved his family back to New York.

For the next 7 years, the Raymond and Eilers travelled the West, compiling information and reporting on issues related to mining. Every winter they published their findings in Congressional House documents.

== First tourists to enter a National Park ==
Normally, while executing their duties and doing their research in the West, Anton and Raymond travelled separately, but in 1871 they decided to explore a region of the United States now known as Yellowstone National Park. Accompanying Anton and Raymond in August 1871 was J.S. Daugherty of Wabash City, Indiana, August F. Thrasher (photographer), Calvin C. Clawson (reporter for the New Northwest) and Gilman Sawtelle, who acted as their guide.

The National Park Service recognizes this party as the first group of 'tourists' to enter a national park for the purposes of simply touring a National Park.(the 1871 Hayden Survey party was also in the park at the time). Both Rossiter Raymond and Calvin Clawson wrote accounts of their journeys in serial form. Rossiter would later bind his into a chapter of a book published in 1880 called Camp and Cabin. Thrasher printed some of this photographs, exhibiting them for several groups of Montanians, before heading east to get them published in a book. At that point, the photographs disappeared, leaving the images’ location an ongoing mystery.

== His years in the smelting industry ==

In 1876, Anton left his role as deputy to Rossiter. That January, he became manager at the Saints John smelter near Montezuma, Colorado, where he constructed works with the help of Franz Fohr, Henry Vezin, and Frank Cazin. In September of that year, Gustav Billing approached Anton about joining him at the Germania Smelting, a lead-silver ore smelter south of Salt Lake City, in what is now Murray, Utah. Eilers was familiar with Billing's plant, having stopped there on several occasions during his time as deputy commissioner. To sweeten his offer, Billing offered to make Anton a partner. Eilers accepted and immediately went to Salt Lake with Billing. By early November 1876, Anton had the lead-silver smelter working day and night, an amazing feat at the time.

Anton was joined at the Germania by Otto Hahn and August Raht, both of whom had distinguished smelting careers. Together, these three refined Anton's concept of slag-types, a way of mixing ores depending on their mineral and chemical makeup to generate predictable products, including lead-silver bullion, matte, speiss, slag, and flue dust. The use of slag-types allowed the Germania to produce bullion on a constant basis, no matter what lead-silver ore the facility received. For his insights at the Germania, Anton was considered the father of lead-silver smelting in the United States.

Eilers' partnership with Billing proved professionally and financially successful between 1876 and 1878. About this time, news arrived that Colorado's Leadville area was rich in lead-silver ore. Seeing opportunity, Billing and Eilers turned over the Germania to Gustav's brother F.W. Billing and left for Leadville, where Anton built a state-of-the-art smelter. The Billing & Eilers smelter became a top tier producer in a short time. Between 1879 and 1881 the works made the pair very wealthy. However, the high mountain location, cold winters, and some health problems led the pair to a friendly split. Anton sold out to Gustav, then headed to Germany, his first return to his mother country, with his oldest daughter Else for six months.

Anton returned to the United States in the summer of 1882. That fall, he was asked to consult on a mine in Monarch, Colorado, called the Madonna mine. Anton told the mine's owners that the low-grade ore was perfect for smelting with nearby ores. He suggested a partnership, where the mine owners would put up the mine, while he raised money to build a smelter on the plains of Colorado. Anton secured the funds and the Colorado Smelting Company was formed. In July 1883, Eilers completed a smelting facility in Pueblo, Colorado. Over the next few years, the Eilers smelter as it was called smelted more than $4 million in lead and silver from the Madonna mine. In the process, the smelter also produced a number of internationally renowned metallurgists under Anton's tutelage, including Anton's own son Karl Eilers.

Four years later, sensing another opportunity, Anton led the formation of the Montana Smelting Company in Great Falls, Montana. However, unlike his previous smelters, this one didn't enjoy the success the others did. This was mainly caused by a lack of cheap lead-silver ore. By the late 1880s and into he 1890, the quantity of high grade ore was declining. Other issues, such as the demonetization of silver, impacted lead-silver smelter revenues as well. To counter these industry problems, Anton and other smeltermen attempted to combine forces.

Throughout the 1890s, the lead-silver smelting industry continued to struggle. There were too many smelters and too few lead-silver ore reserves nationally. Eventually, the independent minded smelting owners were forced to merge, creating in 1899 a large entity called the American Smelting & Refining Company (today known as ASARCO). At its formation, American Smelting owned 2/3 of the smelting trusts in the nation, making them a critical player in the ore and mining industry. In 1901, the Guggenheims smelting and refining assets were added to American Smelting. At that time, the Guggenheims obtained a majority of American Smelting shares and began their dominance of the company.

Anton played an active role on the Executive Committee and Board of Directors of American Smelting and on its sister company, American Smelting Securities Company, between 1901 and 1910. During this period, he was also on the Board of Directors of Wells Fargo, a director on the Seneca Mining Co, a director of the United Missouri River Power Co, and more. In 1910, he retired from the company so he could focus on technical issues he hoped to solve, such as reducing the pollution caused by smelting.

Following an illness, Anton died at Sea Cliff, Long Island, April 22, 1917.

== Personal life ==
Anton and his wife Elizabeth raised 6 children (Else, Karl, Anna, Luise, Emma, and Meta). Over the years, they lived in Ohio, Virginia, Salt Lake City, Denver, and Pueblo, but for nearly all their later years, the family shuttled between their home in Brooklyn and their summer home at Sea Cliff, Long Island. Karl Eilers married Leonie Wurlitzer, daughter of Rudolph Wurlitzer, founder of the Rudolph Wurlitzer Music Company. Only one other daughter, Anna, married. The other four daughters were active in Brooklyn's social scene.
