= Rossiter W. Raymond =

American novelist

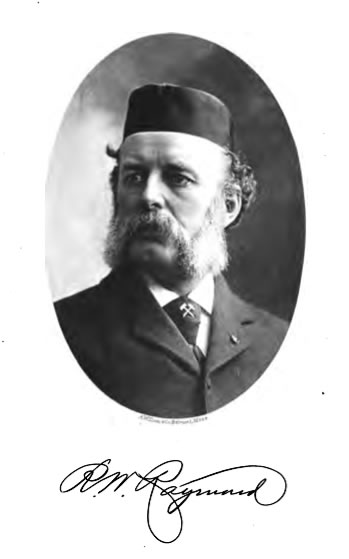
An undated photograph of Rossiter W. Raymond

Rossiter Worthington Raymond (April 27, 1840 in Cincinnati, Ohio – December 31, 1918 in Brooklyn, New York) was an American mining engineer, legal scholar and author. At his memorial, the President of Lehigh University described him as "one of the most remarkable cases of versatility that our country has ever seen—sailor, soldier, engineer, lawyer, orator, editor, novelist, story-teller, poet, biblical critic, theologian, teacher, chess-player—he was superior in each capacity. What he did, he always did well."

== Early years ==
Raymond's father, Robert Raikes Raymond (1817–1888), was a native of New York City, a graduate of Union College (New York) in 1837, editor of the Syracuse Free Democrat in 1852 and Evening Chronicle in 1853–54, and later professor of English in the Brooklyn Polytechnic Institute and principal of the Boston School of Oratory. His mother (born 1818, died 1891) was a native of Providence, Rhode Island. They were married at Columbus, Ohio, in 1839. Rossiter was the eldest of a family of seven children, of whom four were sons and three daughters.

He received his early education in the common schools of Syracuse, New York, where his parents participated in the Underground Railroad, and in 1857 entered the Brooklyn Polytechnic Institute, of which his uncle, John H. Raymond (later president of Vassar College), was then president. Raymond graduated from that institution at the head of his class in 1858.

Having attended college at the Royal Saxon Freiberg Mining Academy, Heidelberg University, and the Ludwig-Maximilians-Universität München, 1858–1861, Rossiter would start his post graduate career serving as aide-de-camp, with the rank of captain, on the staff of John C. Frémont, by whom, during his Civil War campaign in the Valley of Virginia, he was officially commended for gallant and meritorious conduct.

== Working years ==
Following the American Civil War, he entered private practice for several years, forming the partnership of Adelberg and Raymond in 1864 in New York City. Besides consulting work, the firm also aided a number of later prominent German-educated mining engineers begin their careers, until Justus Adelberg's death on June 5, 1869, a result of mercury inhalation.

In 1867, Raymond started a 23-year career as editor of the American Journal of Mining, soon renamed the Engineering and Mining Journal, the longest-running mining periodical in the United States (it is still publishing). As editor, Raymond became one of the most influential voices in American mining. He used his editorial platform to expose poorly and crookedly run mining companies, and under his leadership the Engineering and Mining Journal became a major force for honesty in the mining industry.

His work at the E&MJ led, in 1868, to Raymond's appointment to the coveted position of United States Commissioner of Mines to gather mining statistics on the American West. In 1869, Raymond hired Anton Eilers as Deputy Commissioner and, together and apart, the two explored the entire Far West, becoming national experts on the mining industry and creating large annual reports for Congress. These eight reports, for the years of his office, 1868–1875, contain a wealth of historic information about the mining West during this important period, especially the California Mother Lode, the Comstock Lode of Nevada, and the Rocky Mountains camps of Colorado. See, for example, the published version of the 1869 report.

In the 1860s as well, he helped form the short-lived American Mining Bureau, a forerunner of the American Institute of Mining Engineers. An original member of the American Institute of Mining Engineers, he had, at first, the "Engineering & Mining Journal" serve as its official member publication, and published many of the AIME technical reports prior to publication in its Transactions. He served as one AIME's first vice-presidents in 1871, and again in 1876, and 1877, was president from 1872 to 1875, and long-term secretary from 1884 to 1911. His New York City office became the unofficial center for the mining engineering fraternity. As secretary he also edited 40 of the annual volumes of Transactions, to which he liberally contributed essays, especially pertaining to the Federal mining laws, as well as other articles of importance. In 1945, the institute created the Rossiter W. Raymond Memorial Award after him, to recognize the best paper written each year by an author under 33 years of age.

He was a long-time supporter of Brooklyn's Plymouth Church of the Pilgrims, and was the director of its Sunday school for 50 years. His role in the church was so influential that he was asked to take over for Henry Ward Beecher when Beecher died. He would also play an important role during the Beecher-Tildon scandal.

From 1870 to 1872, he was the professor of ore deposits at Lafayette College, which in 1868 had conferred on him an honorary doctorate. He was the United States Commissioner to the Vienna Exposition. In 1875, he was elected as a member of the American Philosophical Society.

In 1871, he was a part of the a six-member party that entered what is now Yellowstone National Park, running into the Hayden Geological Survey of 1871 in the process. Raymond's party is officially known as the first group of visitors to enter a National Park, though it technically wasn't a national park at the time. Rossiter recorded the visit in his 1880 book Camp and Cabin. The visit was also recorded by Calvin C. Clawson, a reporter for the New Northwest Newspaper. Pictures were taken by August F. Thrasher who, according to Mary C. H. Williams, carried negative plates and photos of the Yellowstone journey as far east as Indiana where the trail grows cold.

In 1885, he was the New York State Commissioner of Electrical Subways.

Rossiter consulted for Cooper, Hewitt & Company for some twenty plus years, and then Hewitt's and Cooper's American Sulphur Company in 1890.

In 1911, during a visit to Japan as members and guests of the American Institute of Mining Engineers (AIME), Raymond received from the Mikado the distinction of Chevalier of the Order of the Rising Sun, fourth class—the highest ever given to foreigners not of royal blood—' "for eminent services to the mining industry of Japan". These services consisted in advice and assistance rendered in America to Japanese engineers, students, and officials throughout a period of more than 25 years.

== Legal scholar ==
Rossiter left an enduring mark on the jurisprudence of mining law. He defined the 'law of the apex' and gave the term 'lode' a definition that not only swayed the decision in Eureka-Richmond lawsuit, but also influenced all later mining litigation. He was even invited to address the United States Supreme Court on a point of mining law, which the Court accepted based on its subsequent decision.

Raymond had not been a lawyer when he testified before the Supreme Court, but in 1898 he was admitted to the bar in both the state and federal courts. In 1903, he was appointed lecturer on mining law at Columbia University. In June 1906, Lehigh University granted Rossiter the first Doctorate of Laws ever granted by the institution.

== Author ==
Raymond was the author of a large number of poems, stories, newspaper articles, biographies, memorials, opinions, fiction and non-fiction books. Unfortunately, most of his original work was destroyed by a fire late in his life.

=== 'Death is Only an Horizon' ===
Despite the large body of work he produced, the opinions he expressed, and the stories he told, he is best known, at least on the internet, for the latter half of a poem titled 'Death is Only an Horizon':

Life is eternal; and love is immortal; and death is only a horizon; and a horizon is nothing save the limit of our sight.

A few sites also credit an extended version to him: "O God, who holdest all souls in life; and callest them unto thee as seemeth best: we give them back, dear God, to thee who gavest them to us. But as thou didst not lose them in the giving, so we do not lose them by their return. For not as the world giveth, givest thou, O Lord of souls: that which thou givest thou takest not away: for life is eternal, and love is immortal, and death is only the horizon, and the horizon is nothing save the limit of our sight." These words were later adapted into the song "Life is Eternal" by Carly Simon, and frequently appear among quotations on the subject of life, death, and sympathy.

However, crediting Mr. Raymond as the author of this quote appears to be an error because the quote "Life is eternal, and love is immortal, and death is only an horizon, and an horizon is nothing save the limit of our site" was written almost 200 years before Rossiter Raymond was born. These words, and many others in Raymond's poem "Death is Only an Horizon" are first recorded in a prayer written by William Penn (1644-1718). This prayer is cited in the NSW Council of Churches Selected Christian Prayers, PR0061. Fr. Bede Jarrett, O.P. also lists this prayer as a prayer of his, but he credits "prayer written by William Penn, 1644-1718". The prayer written by William Penn and documented by the two places listed is as follows: "We give them back to thee, dear Lord, who gavest them to us. Yet as thou didst not lose them in giving, so we have not lost them by their return. What thou gavest thou takest not away, O Lover of souls; for what is thine is ours also if we are thine. And life is eternal and love is immortal, and death is only an horizon, and an horizon is nothing save the limit of our sight. Lift us up, strong Son of God, that we may see further; cleanse our eyes that we may see more clearly; and draw us closer to thyself that we may know ourselves to be nearer to our loved ones who are with thee. And while thou dost prepare for us, prepare us also for that happy place, that where they are and thou art, we too may be for evermore." It appears that many of the lines of this prayer are included in Raymond's poem "Death is Only an Horizon." In contrast, other than references on the internet, no definitive work or reference by Raymond has come to light that includes his version of the poem.

=== List of governmental reports to Congress ===
- [1st] 1868, 40th Cong., 3d sess., House ex. doc. no. 54.
- [2d] 1869, 41st Cong., 2d sess., House ex. doc. no. 207.
- [3d] 1870, 42d Cong., 1st sess., House ex. doc. no. 10.
- [4th], 1871, 42d Cong., 2d sess., House ex. doc. no. 211.
- [5th], 1872, 42d Cong., 3d sess., House ex. doc. no. 210.
- [6th], 1873, 43d Cong., 1st sess., House ex. doc. no. 141.
- [7th], 1874, 43d Cong., 2d sess., House ex. doc. no. 177.
- [8th], 1875, 44th Cong., 1st sess., House ex. doc. no. 159.

=== Partial list of books ===
- Die Leibgarde (1863), a German translation of The Story of the Guard by Mrs. Jessie Fremont (1863).
- The Children's Week (1871).
- Brave Hearts (1873).
- The Man in the Moon and Other People (1874).
- The Book of Job (1878).
- The Merry-go-Round (1880).
- Camp and Cabin (1880).
- A Glossary of Mining and Metallurgical Terms (1881).
- Memorial of Alexander Mining Law (1883–95).
- Two Ghosts and Other Christmas Stories (1887).
- Tales of Three Corners (1890).
- The Life of Peter Cooper (1897).

== Legacy ==
Raymond Peak, a 10,014-foot mountain located in northern California, was named in his honor in 1865.
