= Sierra juniper =

Sierra juniper is a common name for several species of juniper and may refer to:

- Juniperus grandis, endemic to the western United States
- Juniperus occidentalis, native to the western United States
