= Carson–Iceberg Wilderness =

Protected wilderness area in California, United States

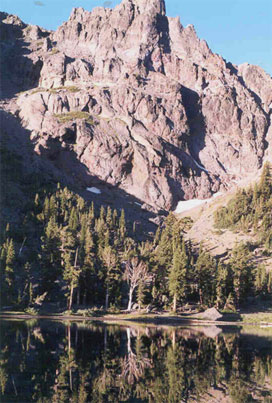

- Location within California Location within the United States
- Interactive map of Carson–Iceberg Wilderness
- Location: Alpine County / Tuolumne County, Sierra Nevada Mountain range, California
- Nearest city: Markleeville, California
- Coordinates: 38°27′02″N 119°44′57″W
- Area: 160,000 acres (650 km^{2})
- Established: 1984
- Governing body: U.S. Forest Service / USDA

The Carson–Iceberg Wilderness is a federal wilderness area located 80 miles (130 km) northeast of Stockton, California. It encompasses 160,000 acres (650 km^{2}) and was designated by the California Wilderness Act of 1984. It protects an area of High Sierra landscape with elevations from 4,800 feet (1,500 m) to 11,462 feet (3,494 m) along the Sierra Mountains from Ebbetts Pass to Sonora Pass in the south. The US Forest Service manages the wilderness which is in both the Stanislaus National Forest and the Humboldt–Toiyabe National Forest.

Located in the wilderness are the headwaters of the Carson River draining the east side of the crest, as well as the North and Middle Forks of the Stanislaus River on the west slopes.

The name Carson–Iceberg comes from two prominent geographical features: the Carson River (named for noted scout and explorer Kit Carson) and the distinctive granite formation called "The Iceberg" on the southern boundary near Clark Fork Road.

Historical highlights: Jedediah Smith crossed the Sierra Nevada Range near Ebbetts Pass sometime in 1827, and the first immigrant party of Bartleson–Bidwell crossed over in 1841 near Sonora Pass.

The wilderness supports large herds of mule deer and there is also good habitat for black bear, which have become a problem due to an insatiable appetite for backpackers' food. The forest cover consists of lodgepole pine, Jeffrey pine, aspen, Sierra juniper and curl-leaf mountain mahogany.

== Paiute cutthroat trout ==
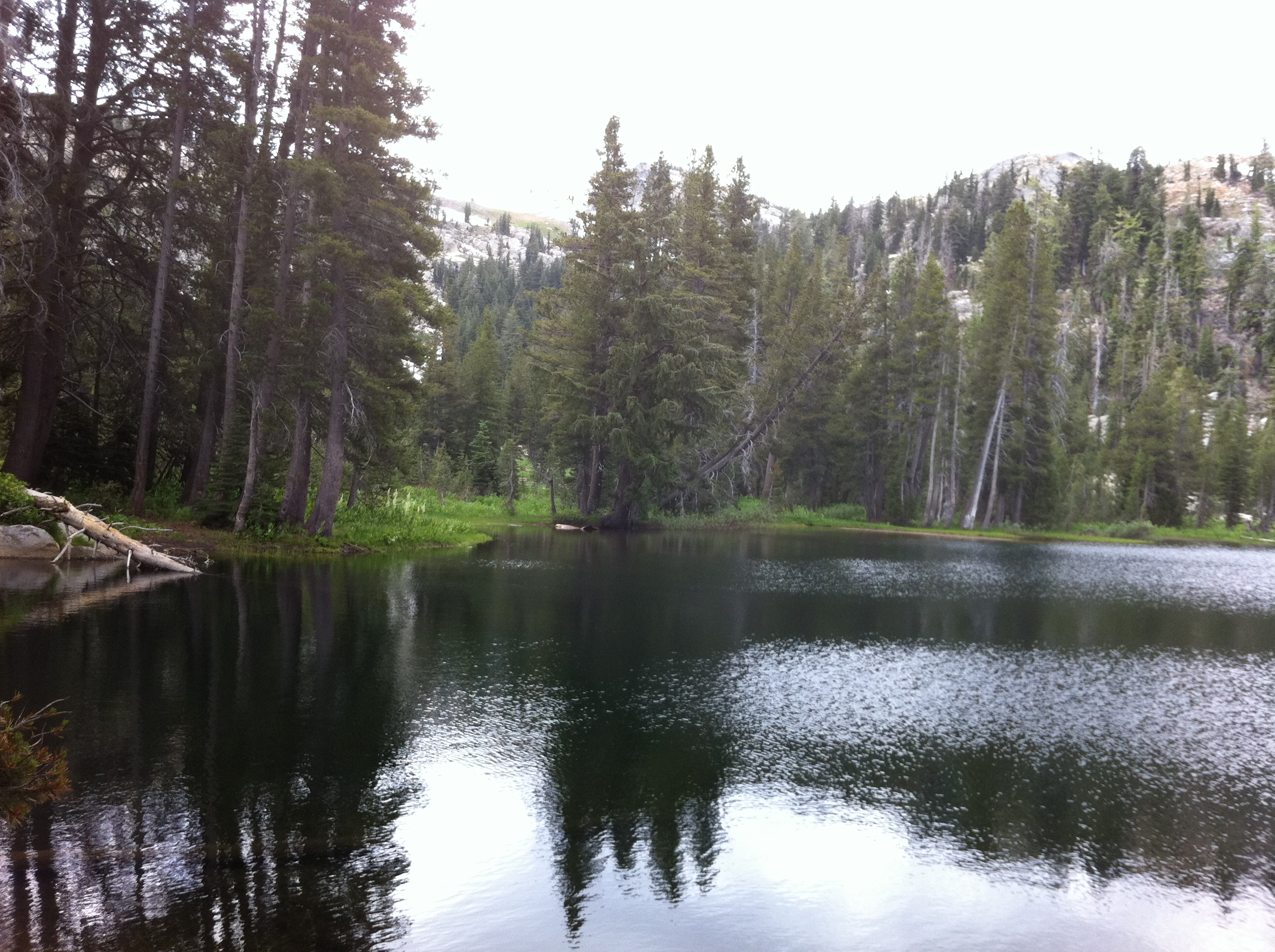
Bull Run Lake, Carson–Iceberg Wilderness

The Carson–Iceberg Wilderness supports a native population of the only Paiute cutthroat trout in existence in the drainages of Silver King Creek, a tributary of the East Fork Carson River. They were listed as endangered under the Endangered Species Preservation Act of 1966 and upgraded to threatened status in 1973 with the passage of the Endangered Species Act (ESA) which allowed regulated fishing of the Paiute. Historically, the US Fish and Wildlife Service believe the Paiute trout only occupied the Silver King Creek and its tributaries below the barrier of LLewellyn Falls, and around 1912 were introduced to other streams where the Paiute hybridized with the Lahonton and rainbow trout species.

The "revised recovery plan" by the US Fish and Wildlife Service seeks to remove nonnative fish from the environment, protect habitat for the current populations of Paiute trout, both within the historical range of the Silver King Creek watershed and the other streams in the region, such as North Fork Cottonwood Creek, and lastly, to study the Paiute trout to better understand the population trends.

The main distinguishing characteristic is the lack of spots on the body. The closely related Lahontan cutthroat trout has between 50 and 100 spots whereas the Paiute may have up to nine, but rarely more than five.

The Paiute trout require a habitat of clean, well-oxygenated, moving water with gravel bottoms and quiet pools near riparian zones. They reach maturity in 2 years, spawn during June and July with eggs hatching in 6–8 weeks and the fry emerging from the gravel in 2–3 weeks. The rate of growth depends on water temperature and food access, with the Silver King Creek Paiute having been measured at 13.5 inches. Predators include the water shrew and the dipper, a bird that can go underwater to feed. Humans impact the Paiute trout as the fish show a lack of wariness to anglers, possibly because of the high elevation environment and lack of predators. Serious population declines have occurred from moderate to light fishing of the trout.

Also in the Silver King Creek watershed are the Sierra Nevada yellow-legged frog, mountain yellow-legged frog and the Yosemite toad.

== Permits ==
A permit is required from May to October for overnight visits into the wilderness but can be used to visit more than one wilderness area in a single trip. There is a limit of 15 people and 25 stock in the wilderness. Leave No Trace methods of wilderness travel are highly encouraged by the US Forest Service.

== Climate ==
Here is an example of climate trends that can be seen in the wilderness at about 7800 feet.
