= Centerville =

Centreville, Centerville, Centre-ville or Centre-Ville and variants may refer to:

== Places ==
=== Bahamas ===
- Centreville (Bahamas Parliament constituency)

=== Canada ===
- Centreville, British Columbia, a ghost town
- Centreville, New Brunswick, a village in Carleton County
- Centreville, Newfoundland and Labrador
- Centreville, Nova Scotia (disambiguation)
- Centreville, Elgin County, Ontario (now known as West Elgin)
- Centreville, Grey County, Ontario
- Centreville, Lennox and Addington County, Ontario
- Centre-ville, the Central business district of any Francophone Canadian city
  - Downtown Montreal - Centre-Ville de Montréal in French

=== United States ===
- Centerville, Alabama, an unincorporated community
- Centreville, Alabama, a city
- Centerville, Arkansas (disambiguation)
- Centerville, California (disambiguation)
- Centerville, Hamden, Connecticut, a neighborhood of Hamden
- Centerville, Delaware, an unincorporated community
- Centerville, Florida, an unincorporated community
- Centerville, Georgia (disambiguation)
- Centerville, Idaho, an unincorporated community
- Centerville, Illinois (disambiguation)
- Centerville, Indiana, a town
- Centerville, Spencer County, Indiana, an unincorporated community
- Centreville, Illinois, a former city
- Centerville, Iowa, a city
- Centerville, Boone County, Iowa, an unincorporated community
- Centerville, Kansas, an unincorporated community
- Centerville, Kentucky (disambiguation)
- Centerville, Louisiana (disambiguation)
- Centerville, Maine, a township
- Centreville, Maryland, a town
- Centerville, Massachusetts, a village
- Centerville River, Massachusetts
- Centreville, Michigan, a village
- Centerville Township, Michigan
- Centerville, Minnesota, a city
- Centerville, Winona County, Minnesota, an unincorporated community
- Centerville, Missouri, a city
- Centreville, Mississippi, a town
- Centerville, Montana, a census-designated place
- Centerville, Nebraska, an unincorporated community
- Centerville, Nevada, an unincorporated community
- Centerville, New Jersey (disambiguation)
- Centerville, New York, a town
- Centerville, Ulster County, New York, a community
- Centerville, North Carolina, a census-designated place
- Centerville, Ohio (disambiguation)
- Centerville, Pennsylvania (disambiguation)
- Centerville, Rhode Island, a village
- Centerville, South Carolina, a census-designated place
- Centerville, South Dakota, a city
- Centerville, Tennessee, a town
- Centerville, Texas, a city
- Centerville, Trinity County, Texas, an unincorporated community
- Centreville, Texas, a ghost town
- Centerville, Utah, a city
- Centerville, Virginia (disambiguation)
- Centerville, Washington, an unincorporated community and census-designated place
- Centerville, Washington, original name of the city of Stanwood, Washington. Changed on account of there being too many Centervilles.
- Centerville, Tyler County, West Virginia, an unincorporated community
- Centerville, Wayne County, West Virginia, an unincorporated community
- Centerville, Wisconsin (disambiguation)

== Schools ==
- Centerville Community College, Centerville, Iowa
- Centerville High School (disambiguation)
- Centreville High School (disambiguation)

== Transportation ==
- Centerville station, Centerville, Iowa, United States, a train station on the National Register of Historic Places
- Centerville station (Central Railroad of New Jersey), original name of a train station in Bayonne
- Terminus Centre-Ville (AMT), a bus station in Montreal, Canada

== Arts and entertainment ==
- Centreville Amusement Park, Toronto Islands, Ontario, Canada
- Centerville, the fictional setting of the 1971 film 200 Motels
- Centerville, the fictional setting of the 2019 film The Dead Don't Die
- "Centerville, Illinois", the fictional setting of the 1983 science fiction spoof Strange Invaders
- Centerville, a 1999 TV short series

== See also ==
- Centerville City (disambiguation)
- Centerville Pioneer Cemetery, Fremont, California
