= California Trail =

Historic migration route in the western United States

The California Trail
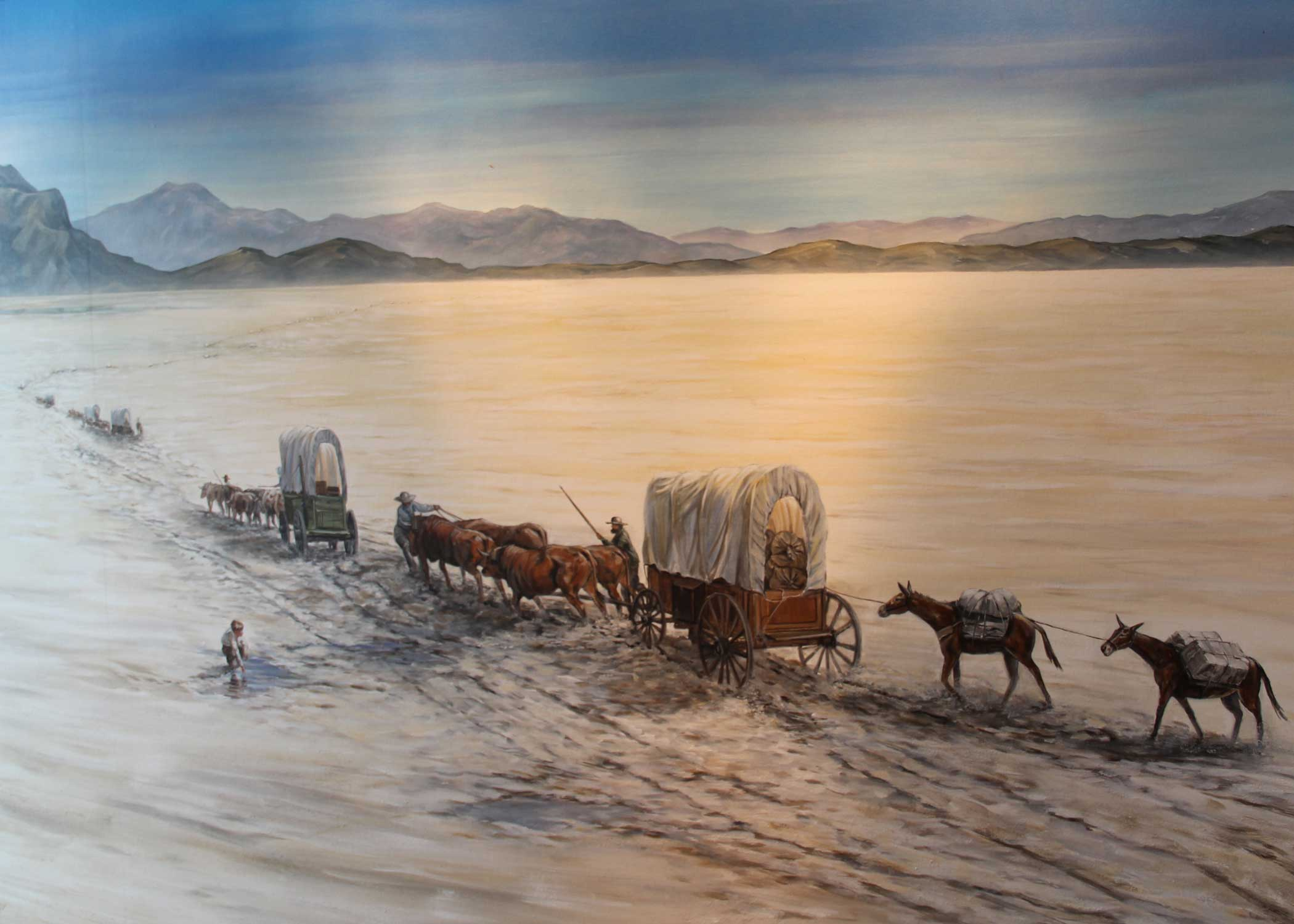
- Depiction of a wagon train crossing the Great Salt Lake Desert toward California

- The California Trail led to the state's gold fields
- Governing body: National Park Service
- Website: California National Historic Trail

The California Trail was an emigrant trail of about 1,600 mi (2,600 km) across the western half of the North American continent from Missouri River towns to what is now the state of California. After it was established, the first half of the California Trail followed the same corridor of networked river valley trails as the Oregon Trail and the Mormon Trail, namely the valleys of the Platte, North Platte, and Sweetwater rivers to Wyoming. The trail has several splits and cutoffs for alternative routes around major landforms and to different destinations, with a combined length of over 5,000 mi (8,000 km).

== Introduction ==
By 1847, two former fur trading frontier forts marked trailheads for major alternative routes through Utah and Wyoming to Northern California. The first was Jim Bridger's Fort Bridger (est. 1842) in present-day Wyoming on the Green River, where the Mormon Trail turned southwest over the Wasatch Range to the newly established Salt Lake City, Utah. From Salt Lake the Salt Lake Cutoff (est. 1848) went north and west of the Great Salt Lake and rejoined the California Trail in the City of Rocks in present-day Idaho.

The main Oregon and California Trails crossed the Yellow River on several different ferries and trails (cutoffs) that led to or bypassed Fort Bridger and then crossed over a range of hills to the Great Basin drainage of the Bear River (Great Salt Lake). Just past present-day Soda Springs, Idaho, both trails initially turned northwest, following the Portneuf River (Idaho) valley to the British Hudson's Bay Company's Fort Hall (est. 1836) on the Snake River in present-day Idaho. From Fort Hall the Oregon and California trails went about 50 miles (80 km) southwest along the Snake River Valley to another "parting of the ways" trail junction at the junction of the Raft and Snake rivers. The California Trail from the junction followed the Raft River to the City of Rocks in Idaho near the present Nevada-Idaho-Utah tripoint. The Salt Lake and Fort Hall routes were about the same length: about 190 miles (310 km).

From the City of Rocks the trail went into the present state of Utah following the South Fork of Junction Creek. From there the trail followed along a series of small streams, such as Thousand Springs Creek in the present state of Nevada until approaching present-day Wells, Nevada, where they met the Humboldt River. By following the crooked, meandering Humboldt River Valley west across the arid Great Basin, emigrants were able to get the water, grass, and wood they needed for themselves and their teams. The water turned increasingly alkaline as they progressed down the Humboldt, and there were almost no trees. "Firewood" usually consisted of broken brush, and the grass was sparse and dried out. Few travelers liked the Humboldt River Valley passage.

[The] Humboldt is not good for man nor beast ... and there is not timber enough in three hundred miles of its desolate valley to make a snuff-box, or sufficient vegetation along its banks to shade a rabbit, while its waters contain the alkali to make soap for a nation.

— Reuben Cole Shaw, 1849

At the end of the Humboldt River, where it disappeared into the alkaline Humboldt Sink, travelers had to cross the deadly Forty Mile Desert before finding either the Truckee River or Carson River in the Carson Range and Sierra Nevada that were the last major obstacles before entering Northern California.

An alternative route across the present states of Utah and Nevada that bypassed both Fort Hall and the Humboldt River trails was developed in 1859. This route, the Central Overland Route, which was about 280 miles (450 km) shorter and more than 10 days quicker, went south of the Great Salt Lake and across the middle of present-day Utah and Nevada through a series of springs and small streams. The route went south from Salt Lake City across the Jordan River to Fairfield, Utah, then west-southwest past Fish Springs National Wildlife Refuge, Callao, Utah, Ibapah, Utah, to Ely, Nevada, then across Nevada to Carson City, Nevada. (Today's U.S. Route 50 in Nevada roughly follows this route.) (See: Pony Express Map) In addition to immigrants and migrants from the East, after 1859 the Pony Express, Overland stages and the First Transcontinental Telegraph (1861) all followed this route with minor deviations.

Once in Western Nevada and Eastern California, the pioneers worked out several paths over the rugged Carson Range and Sierra Nevada into the gold fields, settlements and cities of northern California. The main routes initially (1846–1848) were the Truckee Trail to the Sacramento Valley and after about 1849 the Carson Trail route to the American River and the Placerville, California gold digging region.

Starting about 1859, the Johnson Cutoff (Placerville Route, est. 1850–1851) and the Henness Pass Route (est. 1853) across the Sierra were greatly improved and developed. These main roads across the Sierra were both toll roads so there were funds to pay for maintenance and upkeep on the roads. These toll roads were also used to carry cargo west to east from California to Nevada, as thousands of tons of supplies were needed by the gold and silver miners, etc. working on the Comstock Lode (1859–1888) near the present Virginia City, Nevada. The Johnson Cutoff, from Placerville to Carson City along today's U.S. Route 50 in California, was used by the Pony Express (1860–61) year-round and in the summer by the stage lines (1860–1869). It was the only overland route from the East to California that could be kept partially open for at least horse traffic in the winter.

The California Trail was heavily used from 1845 until several years after the end of the American Civil War; in 1869 several rugged wagon routes were established across the Carson Range and Sierra Nevada to different parts of northern California. After about 1848 the most popular route was the Carson Route which, while rugged, was still easier than most others and entered California in the middle of the gold fields. The trail was heavily used in the summers until the completion of the first transcontinental railroad in 1869 by the Union Pacific and Central Pacific Railroads. Trail traffic rapidly fell off as the cross-country trip was much quicker and easier by train—about seven days. The economy class fare across the western United States of about $69 was affordable by most California-bound travelers.

The trail was used by about 2,700 settlers from 1846 up to 1849. These settlers were instrumental in helping convert California to a U.S. possession. Volunteer members of John C. Frémont's California Battalion assisted the Pacific Squadron's sailors and marines in 1846 and 1847 in conquering California in the Mexican–American War. After the discovery of gold in January 1848, word spread about the California Gold Rush. Starting in late 1848 until 1869, more than 250,000 businessmen, farmers, pioneers and miners passed over the California Trail to California. The traffic was so heavy that in two years the new settlers added so many people to California that by 1850 it qualified for admission as the 31st state with 120,000 residents. The Trail travelers were added to those migrants going by wagon from Salt Lake City to Los Angeles, California, in winter, the travelers down the Gila River trail in Arizona, and those traveling by sea routes around Cape Horn and the Strait of Magellan, or by sea and then across the Isthmus of Panama, Nicaragua, or Mexico, and then by sea to California. Roughly half of California's new settlers came by trail and the other half by sea.

The original route had many branches and cutoffs, encompassing about 5,500 miles (8,900 km) in total. About 1,000 miles (1,600 km) of the rutted traces of these trails remain in Kansas, Nebraska, Wyoming, Idaho, Utah, Nevada, and California as historical evidence of the great mass migration westward. Portions of the trail are now preserved by the Bureau of Land Management (BLM), and the National Park Service (NPS) as the California National Historic Trail and marked by BLM, NPS and the many state organizations of the Oregon-California Trails Association (OCTA). Maps put out by the United States Geological Survey (USGS) show the network of rivers followed to get to California.

== Establishment (1811–1840) ==
The beginnings of the California and Oregon Trails were laid out by mountain men and fur traders from about 1811 to 1840 and were only passable initially on foot or by horseback. South Pass, the easiest pass over the U.S. continental divide of the Pacific Ocean and Atlantic Ocean drainages, was discovered by Robert Stuart and his party of seven in 1812 while he was taking a message from the west to the east back to John Jacob Astor about the need for a new ship to supply Fort Astoria on the Columbia River—their supply ship Tonquin had blown up. In 1824, fur trappers Jedediah Smith and Thomas Fitzpatrick rediscovered the South Pass as well as the Sweetwater, North Platte and Platte River Valleys connecting to the Missouri River.

British fur traders primarily used the Columbia and Snake rivers to take their supplies to their trading posts. After 1824, U.S. fur traders had discovered and developed first pack and then wagon trails along the Platte, North Platte, Sweetwater and Big Sandy River (Wyoming) to the Green River (Colorado River) where they often held their annual Rocky Mountain Rendezvous (1827–1840) held by a fur trading company at which U.S. trappers, mountain men and Indians sold and traded their furs and hides and replenished their supplies they had used up in the previous year.

A rendezvous typically only lasted a few weeks and was known to be a lively, joyous place, where nearly all were allowed—free trappers, Native Americans, native trapper wives and children, travelers, and later on, even tourists who would venture from even as far as Europe to observe the games and festivities. Trapper Jim Beckwourth describes: "Mirth, songs, dancing, shouting, trading, running, jumping, singing, racing, target-shooting, yarns, frolic, with all sorts of drinking and gambling extravagances that white men or Indians could invent." Initially from about 1825 to 1834 the fur traders used pack trains to carry their supplies in and the traded furs out.

=== Beginnings ===
Sections of what became the California Trail route were discovered and developed by American fur traders including Kit Carson, Joseph R. Walker, and Jedediah Smith, who often worked with the Rocky Mountain Fur Company and after 1834 by the American Fur Company and explored widely in the west. Canadian Hudson's Bay Company trappers led by Peter Skene Ogden and others scouted the Humboldt River off and on from about 1830 to 1840—little of their explorations was known. A few U.S. and British fur trappers and traders had explored what is now called the Humboldt River (named Mary's River by Ogden) that crosses most of the present state of Nevada and provides a natural corridor to western Nevada and eastern California.

The Humboldt River was of little interest to the trappers as it was hard to get to, dead ended in an alkali sink, and had few beavers. The details of the Humboldt River and how to get to it was known to only a few trappers. When trapping largely ceased in the 1840s due to a change in men's hat style that didn't use the felt from beaver's fur there was a number of out of work fur trappers and traders who were familiar with many of the Indians, trails, and rivers in the west.

In 1832, Captain Benjamin Bonneville, a United States Military Academy graduate on temporary leave, followed the fur traders paths along the valleys of the Platte, North Platte and Sweetwater Rivers to South Pass (Wyoming) with a fur trader's caravan of 110 men and 20 wagons over and on to the Green River—the first wagons over South Pass.

In the spring of 1833, Captain Benjamin Bonneville sent a party of men under former fur trapper and "now" explorer Joseph R. Walker to explore the Great Salt Lake desert and Big Basin and attempt to find an overland route to California. Eventually the party re-discovered the Humboldt River crossing much of present-day Nevada. After crossing the hot and dry Forty Mile Desert they passed through the Carson River Canyon across the Carson Range and ascended the Sierra Nevada. They descended from the Sierra via the Stanislaus River drainage to the Central Valley of California and proceeded on west as far as Monterey, California—the Californio capital. His return route from California went across the southern Sierra mountains via what's named now Walker Pass—named by U.S. Army topographic engineer, explorer, adventurer, and map maker John C. Frémont.

The Humboldt River Valley was key to forming a usable California Trail. The Humboldt River with its water and grass needed by the livestock (oxen, mules horses and later cattle) and emigrants provided a key link west to northern California. One of several "parting of the ways" that split the Oregon and California Trails was eventually established at the Snake River and Raft River junctions in what is now Idaho. The Raft River, Junction Creek in the future states of Idaho and Utah and Thousand Springs Creek in the future states of Nevada and Utah provided the usable trail link between the Snake and Humboldt Rivers.

After about 1832, a rough wagon trail had been blazed to the Green River—the chief tributary of the Colorado River. After 1832, the fur traders often brought wagon loads of supplies to trade with the white and Native American fur trappers at their annual rendezvous usually somewhere on the Green River. They returned to the Missouri River towns by following their rough trail in reverse. The future Oregon/California wagon trail had minimal improvements, usually limited to partially filling in impassable gullys, etc. By 1836, when the first Oregon migrant wagon train was organized in Independence, Missouri, a wagon trail had been scouted and roughed out to Fort Hall, Idaho. In July 1836, missionary wives Narcissa Whitman and Eliza Spalding were the first white pioneer women to cross South Pass on their way to Oregon Territory via Fort Hall. They left their wagons at Fort Hall and went the rest of the way by pack train and boats down the Columbia River as recommended by the Hudson's Bay Company trappers at Fort Hall.

As early as 1837, John Marsh, who was the first American doctor in California and the owner of the large Rancho Los Meganos, realized that owning a great rancho was problematic if he could not hold it. The corrupt and unpredictable rulings by courts in California (then part of Mexico) made this questionable. With evidence that the Russians, French and English were preparing to seize the province, he determined to make it a part of the United States. He felt that the best way to go about this was to encourage emigration by Americans to California, and in this way the history of Texas would be repeated.

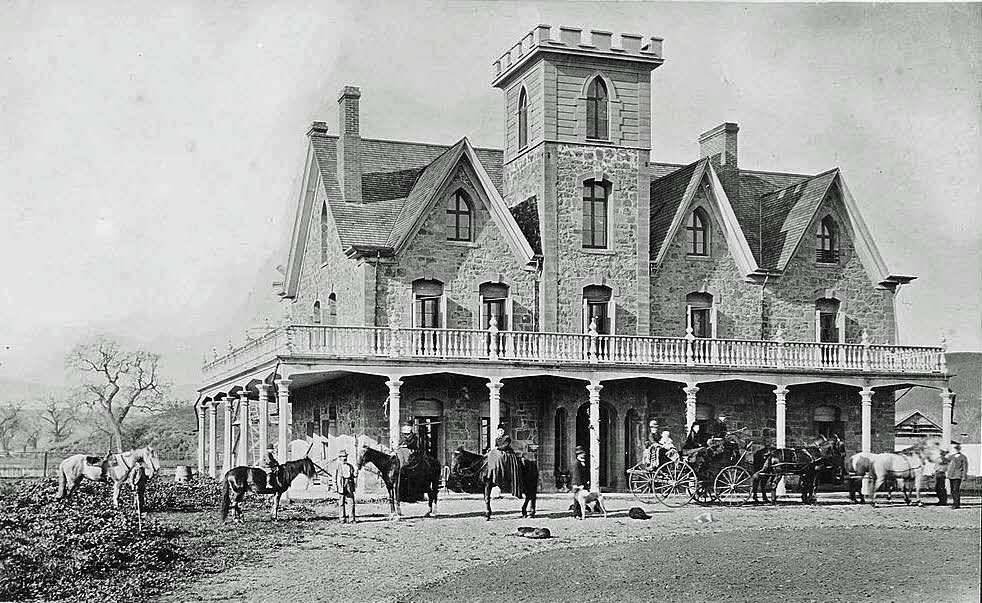
John Marsh's ranch was the end of the California Trail. His large stone house still stands and is now part of Marsh Creek State Park in Contra Costa County.

Marsh conducted a letter-writing campaign espousing the California climate, soil and other reasons to settle there, as well as the best route to follow (the California Trail), which became known as "Marsh's route." His letters were read, reread, passed around, and printed in newspapers throughout the country, and started the first significant immigration to California. The trail ended at his ranch, and he invited immigrants to stay on his ranch until they could get settled, and assisted in their obtaining passports.

After ushering in the period of organized emigration to California, Marsh helped take California from the last Mexican governor, thereby paving the way to California's ultimate acquisition by the United States.

=== Bartleson–Bidwell Party ===
The first recorded party to use part of the California Trail to get to California was the Bartleson–Bidwell Party in 1841. They left Missouri with 69 people and reasonably easily reached the future site of Soda Springs, Idaho on the Bear River by following experienced trapper Thomas "Broken-hand" Fitzpatrick on his way to Fort Hall. Near Soda Springs the Bear River swung southwest towards the Great Salt Lake and the regular Oregon Trail headed northwest out of the Big Basin drainage and into the Portneuf River (Idaho) drainage to Fort Hall on the Snake River.

About half of the party elected to attempt to continue by wagon to California and half elected to go to Oregon on the more established Oregon Trail. The California-bound travelers (including one woman and one child), knew only that California was west of them and there was reportedly a river across most of the 'Big Basin' that led part of the way to California. Without guides or maps, they traveled down the Bear River as it looped southwest through Cache Valley, Utah. When they found the Bear River terminating in the Great Salt Lake, they traveled west across the Big Basin through the rough and sparse semi-desert north of the Great Salt Lake.

After crossing most of what would become the state of Utah and passing into the future state of Nevada, they missed the head of the Humboldt River and abandoned their wagons in Nevada at Big Spring at the foot of the Pequop Mountains. They continued west using their oxen and mules as pack animals eventually finding the Humboldt River and followed it west to its termination in an alkali sink near present-day Lovelock, Nevada.

After crossing the difficult Forty Mile Desert they turned to the south on the east side of the Sierra until they reached the Walker River draining east out of the Sierra Nevada Mountains. They followed the Walker westward as they ascended over the rugged Sierra Nevada mountains roughly in the same region crossed by Jedediah Smith in 1828. They were able to finish their rugged trip over the Sierra and into the future state of California by killing and eating many of their oxen for food. Everyone survived the journey.

=== Joseph Chiles ===
Joseph B. Chiles, a member of the Bartleson–Bidwell Party, returned east in 1842 and organized the first of his seven California-bound immigrant companies in 1843. Following the Oregon Trail to Fort Bridger, the Chiles company enlisted mountain man Joseph R. Walker as a guide. Chiles and Walker split the company into two groups. Walker led the company with the wagons west toward California by following the Oregon Trail to Fort Hall, Idaho, and turning west off the Oregon trail at the Snake River, Raft River junction. At the head of the Raft River they crossed a divide into the Big Basin drainage and followed a series of streams like Thousand Springs Creek in what is now Nevada to the Humboldt River valley near today's Wells, Nevada.

They blazed a wagon trail down the Humboldt River Valley and across Forty Mile Desert until they hit the Carson River. Here instead of immediately attempting to cross the Sierra by following the Carson River as it came out of the mountains they turned south, traveling east of the Sierra along what is now roughly the Nevada and California border—about where U.S. Route 395 in California is today.

With scarce provisions, winter approaching and failing draft animals, by the end of 1843 they had traveled south almost 300 miles (480 km) on the east side of the Sierra before they abandoned their wagons near Owens Lake in eastern central California and proceeded by pack train to make a December crossing of the Sierra Nevada mountains over Walker Pass 35°39′47″N 118°1′37″W on California State Route 178) in the southeast Sierra, an arduous route used by almost no one else.

Trying to find a different route, Chiles led the rest of the settlers in a pack train party down the Oregon Trail to where it intersected the Malheur River in eastern Oregon which he then followed across Oregon to California.

=== John Fremont ===
Another mixed party on horseback of U.S. Army topographers, hunters, scouts, etc. of about 50 men in 1843–1844 led by U.S. Army Colonel John C. Frémont of the United States Army Corps of Engineers and his chief scout Kit Carson took their exploration company down the Humboldt River, crossing Forty Mile Desert and then following what is now called the Carson River across the Carson Range that is east of what is now called Lake Tahoe—previously seen but not explored by Fremont from a peak near what is now called Carson Pass.

They made a winter crossing of the Carson Range and Sierra Nevada in February 1843. From Carson pass they followed the northern Sierra's southern slopes, to minimize snow depth, of what is now called the American River Valley down to Sutter's Fort located near what is now Sacramento, California. Fremont took the data gathered by his topographers and map makers in his 1843–1844 and 1846–1847 explorations of much of the American west to create and publish (by order of Congress) the first "decent" map of California and Oregon in 1848.

=== First wagons to cross ===
The first group to cross the Sierra with their wagons was the Stephens–Townsend–Murphy Party of 1844. They departed from the Oregon Trail along the Snake River by following the Raft River to the City of Rocks in Idaho and then passed over the Big Basin continental divide and used a series of springs and small streams in what is now Nevada to get to the Humboldt River near where the town of Wells, Nevada is now.

They followed the Humboldt River across Nevada and the future Truckee Trail Route across the rugged Forty Mile Desert and along the Truckee River to the foot of the Sierra. They got over the Sierra at Donner Pass by unloading the wagons and packing the contents to the top using their ox teams as pack animals. The wagons were then partially dis-assembled and then pulled by multiple teams of oxen up the steep slopes and cliffs. Some wagons were left at Donner Lake. Once on top, the remaining wagons were reassembled and reloaded for their trip to Sutter's Fort (Sacramento, California).

They were caught by early winter snows and abandoned their wagons near Emigrant Gap and had to hike out of the Sierra after being rescued by a party from Sutter's Fort on February 24, 1845. Their abandoned wagons were retrieved in the spring of 1845 and pulled the rest of the way to Sutter's Fort. A usable but very rough wagon route had finally been worked out along the Humboldt River and the rugged, hot and dry Forty Mile Desert across Nevada and over the rugged and steep Sierra Nevada by California-bound settlers. In the following years, several other rugged routes over the Sierra were developed.

=== Hastings Cutoff ===
Pioneered by Lansford Hastings in 1846, the Hastings Cutoff left the California Trail at Fort Bridger in Wyoming. In 1846 the Harlan-Young party, guided by Hastings, passed successfully through the rugged, narrow, rock-filled Weber Canyon to get over the Wasatch Range. In a few places the wagons had to be floated down the river in some narrow spots and the wagons had to be pried over large rocks in many places.

Passing the future site of Ogden, Utah and Salt Lake City, Utah Hastings party proceeded south of the Great Salt Lake and then across about 80 miles (130 km) of waterless Bonneville Salt Flats and around the Ruby Mountains in Nevada before getting to the Humboldt River Valley California trail. The severely water-challenged Hastings Cutoff trail across the Great Salt Lake's salt flats rejoined the California Trail about 7 miles (11 km) west of modern-day Elko, Nevada. The party led by Hastings were just two weeks ahead of the Donner Party but did successfully get to California before snow closed the passes and stranded the Donner Party in the Sierra.

As recommended by a message from Hastings after he got through Weber canyon, another branch of the Hastings trail was cut across the Wasatch Range by the Donner Party. Their rough trail required clearing a very rough wagon trail through thick brush down Emigration Canyon to get into the Salt Lake Valley. To avoid cutting too much brush in some places they used multiple ox teams to pull wagons up steep slopes to get around brush loaded canyon sections. Cutting this rough trail slowed the Donner Party down by about two weeks—Hastings successfully navigated the rugged Weber Canyon in about four days.

The Mormon Trail over the Wasatch Mountains followed roughly the same path as the Donner Party trail of 1846 but they built a much better trail with many more workers in 1847 to get to the Salt Lake valley with much less difficulty — this was their main route to and from their Salt Lake communities. The Weber Canyon trail was judged too rugged for regular use without a lot of work—later done by Mormon workers on the first transcontinental railroad in 1868–1869.

All of the Hastings Cutoffs to California were found to be very hard on the wagons, livestock and travelers as well as being longer, harder, and slower to traverse than the regular trail and was largely abandoned after 1846. It was discovered by some hurrying travelers in 1849 (before the experience of the 1846 travelers was widely known) that during a wet year, wagons could not be pulled across the Great Salt Lake Desert; it was too soft.

=== Salt Lake Cutoff ===
In 1848, the Salt Lake Cutoff was discovered by returning Mormon Battalion soldiers and others from the City of Rocks (in the future state of Idaho) to the northwest of the Great Salt Lake and on to Salt Lake City. This cutoff allowed travelers to use the Mormon Trail from Fort Bridger over the Wasatch Range to Salt Lake City and back to the California Trail. In Salt Lake they could get repairs and fresh supplies and livestock by trade or cash.

The Mormons were trying to establish new Mormon communities in Utah and needed almost everything then. The trail from Fort Bridger to Salt Lake City and over the Salt Lake Cutoff was about 180 miles (290 km) before it rejoined the California Trail near the City of Rocks in Idaho. This cutoff had adequate water and grass, and many thousands of travelers used this cutoff for years. The "regular" California Trail from Fort Bridger via Fort Hall on the Snake River and on to the City of Rocks was within a few miles of being the same distance as going to Salt Lake City and on to the City of Rocks via the Salt Lake Cutoff.

=== Central Overland Route ===
In April 1859, an expedition of U.S. Corp of Topographical Engineers led by U.S. Army Captain James H. Simpson left U.S. Army's Camp Floyd (Utah) (now Fairfield, Utah) in central Utah to establish an army western supply route across the Great Basin to California. Upon his return in early August 1859, Simpson reported that he had surveyed what became the Central Overland Route from Camp Floyd to Genoa, Nevada. This route went through central Nevada roughly where U.S. Route 50 goes today from Carson City, Nevada, to Ely, Nevada. From Ely the route is approximated today by the roads to Ibapah, Utah, Callao, Utah, Fish Springs National Wildlife Refuge, Fairfield, Utah to Salt Lake City, Utah (See: Pony Express Map and Pony Express auto route)

The Central Overland Route was about 280 miles (450 km) shorter than the 'standard' California Trail Humboldt River route. This Central Overland Route, with minor modifications was used by settler's wagon trains, the Pony Express, stagecoach lines and the First Transcontinental Telegraph after 1859.

==== Literary descriptions ====
Several accounts of travel along the Central Overland Route have been published. In July 1859, Horace Greeley made the trip, at a time when Chorpenning was using only the eastern segment (they reconnected with the main California Trail near present-day Beowawe, Nevada). Greeley published his detailed observations in his 1860 book An Overland Journey from New York to San Francisco.

In October 1860, the English explorer Richard Burton traveled the entire route at a time when the Pony Express was operating. He gave detailed descriptions of each of the way stations in his 1861 book The City of the Saints, Across the Rocky Mountains to California.

Samuel Clemens (Mark Twain) traveled the route in the summer of 1861 with his brother Orion on their way to Nevada's new territorial capital in Carson City, Nevada, but provided only sparse descriptions of the road in his 1872 book Roughing It.

== Early history and maps of the California Trail (1826–1850) ==
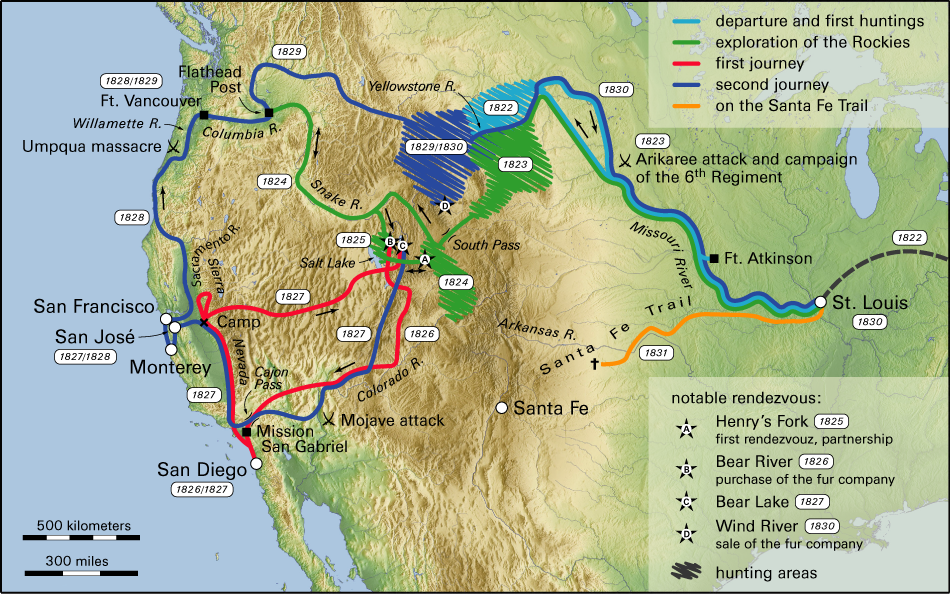
The exploration of the West by Jedediah Smith

The Great Basin and the Sierra Nevada through which the trail passed were first explored by British and American fur trappers. U.S. trapper, explorer and fur trader Jedediah Smith led two expeditions into California and over the Sierra Nevada and back from 1826 to 1829. It is believed that on his first trip he used the Mojave River route (later part of the Old Spanish Trail) to get into California and 8,730 feet (2,660 m) Ebbetts Pass when leaving California in the spring 1827. On Smith's second trip he entered California the same way and left through Oregon. Smith was killed in 1831 before he could publish his explorations, which were only known by word of mouth.

In 1828–1829, Peter Skene Ogden, leading expeditions for the British Hudson's Bay Company, explored much of the Humboldt River area—named by him the Mary's River. The results of these explorations were held as proprietary secrets for many decades by the Hudson's Bay Company. In 1834 Benjamin Bonneville, a United States Army officer on leave to pursue an expedition to the west financed by John Jacob Astor, sent Joseph R. Walker and a small horse mounted party westward from the Green River in present-day Wyoming. They were charged with the mission of finding a route to California. Walker confirmed that the Humboldt River furnished a natural artery across the Great Basin to the Sierra Nevada. He eventually got across the Sierra Nevada in southern California over Walker Pass. Bonneville had the account of his and Walker's explorations in the west written up by Washington Irving in 1838. (See "The Adventures of Captain Bonneville").

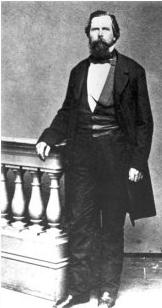
John Bidwell

A few hundred mountain men and their families had been filtering into California for several decades prior to 1841 over various paths from Oregon and Santa Fe. The first known emigrants to use parts of the California Trail was the 1841 Bartleson–Bidwell Party. They followed the Humboldt River across Nevada and eventually made it into northern California. Other parts of this party split off and were one of the first sets of emigrants to use the Oregon Trail to get to Oregon. The California-bound travelers, striking out from the Snake River and passing into Nevada, missed the head of the Humboldt River there. They abandoned their wagons in eastern Nevada and finished the trip by pack train. After an arduous transit of the Sierra (its believed over Ebbetts Pass), members of this group later founded Chico, California in the Sacramento Valley. In 1842 (a year without any known California Trail emigration), Joseph Chiles, a member of the Bartleson–Bidwell Party of 1841, returned with several others back east. In 1843, Chiles led a party (of seven he eventually would lead) back to California. At Fort Hall he met Joseph Reddeford Walker who he convinced to lead half the settlers with him traveling in wagons back to California down the Humboldt. Chiles led the rest in a pack train party down the Malheur River to California. Walker's party in 1843 also abandoned their wagons and finished getting to California by pack train.

In 1844, Caleb Greenwood and the Stephens-Townsend-Murphy Party became the first settlers to take wagons over the Sierra Nevada and into California over what became the Truckee Trail. They abandoned their wagons in the early snow in the winter of 1844/1845 and finished retrieving their wagons from the mountains in the spring of 1845. In 1845, John C. Frémont and Lansford Hastings guided parties totaling several hundred settlers along the Humboldt River portion of the California Trail to California. They were the first to make the entire trip by wagon in one traveling season. In 1846 it is believed that about 1,500 settlers made their way to California over the Truckee branch of the California Trail—just in time to join the war for independence there. Many of the 1845 and 1846 emigrants were recruited into the California Battalion to assist the U.S. Navy's Pacific Squadron with its sailors and marines in the fight for California's independence from Mexico.

The last immigrant party in 1846 was the Donner Party, who were persuaded by Lansford Hastings, who had only traveled over the route he recommended by pack train, to take what would be called the Hastings Cutoff around the south end of the Great Salt Lake. At the urging of Hastings, the Donner's were induced to make a new 'cutoff' over the rugged Wasatch Range where there were no wagon trails. Hastings recommended this despite the fact that he had successfully led about 80 wagons in the Harlan-Young party who blazed a new trail down the rugged Weber River to the Utah valley—he thought the Weber River route was too rugged for general travel. The Donner party spent over a week's hard work scratching a barely usable path across the Wasatch mountains, getting ever further behind Hastings's Party. When the Mormons tried using the Donner blazed trail in 1847 they were forced to abandon most of it and cut (with many more settlers available to clear trees and brush) a new and much easier to use trail (part of the Mormon Trail) to the Salt Lake Valley—taking 10 days of hard work to get through the Wasatch mountains.

The Hastings Cutoff went across about 80 miles (130 km) waterless salt flats south of the Great Salt Lake. While crossing the Salt Flats the Donner party, even though following the tracks of the Harlan-Young party, lost several wagons and many animals. After crossing, they spent almost a week at Donner Springs near the base of Pilot Peak (Nevada) in Box Elder County, Utah trying to recover themselves and their animals. They had to use even more time skirting around the Ruby Mountains in Nevada before hitting the Humboldt River and the regular trail. Altogether, crossing the Wasatch mountains and salt flats and skirting the Rubys cost them about three weeks more time over what staying on the main trail would have taken. They and their surviving wagons and teams were in poor shape. To add insult to injury the Donner-Reed party encountered others that had left Ft. Bridger after them, stayed on the main trail to Ft. Hall, and were now ahead of them. They were the last emigrants of 1846 to arrive in California—east of the Sierra and just as it started to snow. They were stranded by early snowfall in the eastern Sierra near what is now called Donner Lake and suffered severely including starvation, death and cannibalism (See: Donner Party).

The first "decent" map of California and Oregon were drawn by Captain John C. Frémont of the U.S. Army's Corps of Topographical Engineers, and his topographers and cartographers in about 1848. Fremont and his men, led by his guide and former trapper Kit Carson, made extensive expeditions starting in 1844 over parts of California and Oregon including the important Humboldt River and Old Spanish Trail routes. They made numerous topographical measurements of longitude, latitude and elevation as well as cartographic sketches of the observable surroundings. His map, although in error in minor ways, was the best map available in 1848. John C. Frémont gave the Great Salt Lake, Humboldt River, Pyramid Lake, Carson River, Walker River, Old Spanish Trail etc. their current names. The Truckee River (called the Salmon-Trout River by Fremont) in California and Nevada was mapped. Lake Tahoe is shown but left unnamed. The major rivers in California are shown, presumably given the names used by the trappers and Mexican and foreign settlers there. The Humboldt was named (after the great explorer Alexander von Humboldt). Fremont and his topographers/cartographers did not have time (it would take literally decades of work to do this) to make extensive explorations of the entire Sierra Nevada range or Great Basin. Details of the Sierra Nevada and Great Basin concerning the best passes or possible emigrant routes for wagons would be explored and discovered from about 1846 to 1859 by numerous other explorers.

Fremont, together with his wife Jessie Benton Fremont, wrote an extensive account of his explorations and published the first "accurate" map of California and Oregon making them much more widely known. The U.S. Senate had 10,000 copies of Fremont's map and exploration write-up printed. How many of these maps were actually in the hands of early immigrants is unknown.

The trickle of emigrants before 1848 became a flood after the discovery of gold in California in January 1848, the same year that the U.S. acquired and paid for possession of the New Mexico Territory and California Territory in the Treaty of Guadalupe Hidalgo, which terminated the Mexican–American War. The gold rush to northern California started in 1848 as settlers in Oregon, southern California, South America and Mexico headed for the gold fields even before the gold discovery was widely known about in the east. The public announcement of the gold discovery by President Polk in late 1848 and the display of an impressive amount of gold in Washington induced thousands of gold seekers in the east to begin making plans to go to California.

By the spring of 1849 tens of thousands of gold seekers headed westward for California. The California Trail was one of three main ways used as Argonauts went by the California Trail, across the disease ridden Isthmus of Panama and around the storm tossed Cape Horn between South America and Antarctica to get to California. The 1848 and 1849 gold rushers were just the first of many more as many more sought to seek their fortunes during the California Gold Rush, which continued for several years as miners found about $50,000,000 worth of gold (at $21/troy oz) each year.

1849 was also the first year of large scale cholera epidemics in the United States and the rest of the world, and thousands are thought to have died along the trail on their way to California—most buried in unmarked graves in Kansas and Nebraska. The 1850 census showed this rush was overwhelmingly male as the ratio of women to men in California over 16 was about 5:95

Combined with the settlers that came by sea, the California settlers that came over the California Trail by 1850 were sufficient (at about 93,000) for California to choose its state boundary, write a Constitution, and apply for and receive statehood, which it did as a free state.

The busy times on the trail were from late April to early October with almost no winter traffic (several parts of the trail were impassable in winter). In busy years the trail was more like a large immigrating village hundreds of miles long, as thousands used the same parts of the trail in the same short traveling season. Many signed up to wagon trains that traveled the whole route together. Many large trains broke up into several smaller trains to take better advantage of available camping spots, traveling schedules, conditions of teams, etc.. Others, usually traveling as family groups of various sizes, joined and left various trains as their own schedule, inclinations, altercations and traveling conditions dictated. Because of the numerous scrabbles often present in a given wagon train, a typical train may have several different leaders elected at various times to lead the train. Possible Indian troubles was about the only condition that kept large trains together for mutual protection. The 1849 travelers went in a wet year and found good grass almost the entire way and that most had taken too many supplies. The 1850 migration was in a dry year and with roughly double the number of travelers on the trail it suffered seriously from lack of grass and good water. To make things worse many had cut down on the amount of supplies they carried and began running out of food as they traveled down the Humboldt. Emergency relief expeditions led by the U.S. Army and others from California managed to save most of these late 1850 travelers.

== Preparation: trail supplies and equipment ==
Books, pamphlets and guides were available for trail information after about 1846. After 1848, information about the trip to California and Oregon and what was needed for the trip was often available in the local newspapers, as, after 1849, mail and news (heavily subsidized) got back to the U.S. (via Panama) in about 40 days. By 1848 the newspapers of the day often published articles about California. After deciding to go, the first thing many did was to sell their farm or business, and start putting together an outfit. The 1850 U.S. Census of California showed that more than 95% of the people going to California in 1849 were male.

The first decision to make was what route to take to California, the California Trail or the various sea routes. Initially, about half of the Argonauts going to California went by sea, and half overland by trail. Most of those going by sea, which was quicker but more costly, lived on or near the East Coast of the United States and were familiar with ships and shipping. On the other hand, most of those going overland already lived in the mid-west or near the Ohio, Mississippi or Missouri Rivers. Nearly all reached their jumping off place by using a steamboat to get there with their animals and supplies. Of the Argonauts who returned from California, about 20% of them usually returned by sea across the Isthmus of Panama, particularly after 1855 when the paddle steamer shipping lines and the Panama Railroad across Panama cut the return trip to about 40 days versus about 140 days by wagon.

About 50–70% of the Argonauts who went by the California Trail were farmers, and many already had many of the supplies, wagons, animals etc. needed. A pioneer's typical outfit, for three to six people, usually consisted of one or two small, sturdy farm wagons outfitted with bows and a canvas cover (new cost about $75 to $175 each), six to ten head of oxen ($75 to $300) and chains and yokes or harnesses to attach them to the wagons. For traveling about 2,000 miles (3,200 km) over rough terrain the wagons used were typically as small and as light as would do the job, approximately half the size of the larger Conestoga wagons used for freight. The typical California Trail wagon weighed about 1,300 pounds (590 kg) empty with about 2,500 pounds (1,100 kg) of capacity (starting with less than 2,000 pounds (910 kg) recommended) and about 88 cubic feet (2.5 m^{3}) of storage space in an 11 feet (3.4 m)-long, 4 feet (1.2 m)-wide, by 2 feet (0.61 m)-high box. These wagons could be easily pulled by 4 to 6 oxen or 4 to 6 mules or horses. More animals than initially needed were usually recommended since some could (and usually did) stray off, die or be stolen during the trip. In addition to providing transport, shelter and protection against bad weather during the trip at the end of the trip many wagons were parked and became a temporary home until a more permanent cabin or shelter could be built. The average number of occupants of a typical wagon was about three pioneers per wagon (Mormon "church teams" often had eight-plus pioneers).

Accompanying nearly all wagon trains was a herd of horses, cows, oxen or mules. In many years it is estimated that there were more animals than people using the trail. A thriving trade consisted of herds of cows and sheep bought in the mid-west, herded over the trail and sold in California, Oregon etc.. The usually much cheaper animals in the mid-west could be herded to California etc. and sold for usually a substantial profit. Large herds were typically separated from the regular wagon trains because of their different speeds and herding requirements. These animals were usually the daytime responsibility of one or more herder(s) and the nighttime responsibility of the three or more wagon train guards. Each adult male, on a rotating schedule, was usually required to spend part of a night on guard duty.

The typical wagon with 40 to 50 inches (1.0 to 1.3 m) diameter wheels could easily move over rough ground and rocks without high centering and even over most tree stumps if required. The wooden wheels were protected with an iron rim (tire) typically about 1.5 inches (3.81 cm) wide. These iron tires were installed hot so they would shrink tightly onto the wood wheel when they cooled. Nevertheless, it was often necessary to use wooden wedges to keep the iron rim on or soak the wheel in water. The dry desert air sometimes dried the tires so much the iron tire was prone to fall off. Wagon wheels could often be repaired by blacksmiths found along the way or replaced with an abandoned wagon's wheel but otherwise if damaged the wagon usually had to be abandoned. Some damaged wagons were salvaged by cutting the wagon in half and converting the front or rear half of the wagon into a two-wheeled cart. Most of the wagons had a large toolbox, mounted on the left side, usually containing an ax, wagon jack, ropes, short handled shovel, wheel chains for securing the wheels for steep descents and extra chain to hook up another team if double teaming was required for steep ascents and other tools often needed or used. The wagon jack was used for raising each wagon wheel. Then the large axle nut could be unscrewed and the wheel removed for greasing which was required periodically. The wheels were greased with a mixture of tar or pine resin and lard contained in a covered wooden bucket or large ox horn often hanging from the rear axle to keep its greasy contents away from other goods. Starting with at least one gallon of wagon grease was recommended. On a wagon there was essentially no reverse or brakes and the turning radius was nearly always greater than 125 feet (38 m) so the teamsters had to think about how to extract the wagon and his team from wherever they went.

When mules or horses were chosen to pull the wagons, they typically cost about twice as much money and required more expensive harnesses. Oxen (used by 60–70%) were found to be cheaper, tougher, stronger, easier to catch, more easily trained, less prone to be stolen and better able to survive on the often sparse feed found along the way. Their only drawback was they were initially about 10% slower (2–3 miles/hour), but they often passed the mule and horse pulled teams as the trip wore on and the other teams wore out. Since the most popular draft animal was ox teams (≈70%), most walked nearly all the way to their destination. Some of the luckier ones had riding horses or mules and could afford to have someone else drive the wagon team. Mules were the second choice (used by 20–30%) but trained animals were hard to find, and it took up to two months to train them. Mules did better than horses on the often poor feed found along the way. Horses were often found to be incapable of the months of daily work and poor feed encountered without using supplemental grain (initially unavailable or too heavy), and thousands were recorded as dying near the end of the trip in the Forty Mile Desert. Horses and mules had the added disadvantage that they nearly always required herding and guarding day and night to prevent them from wandering off, stampeding, or being stolen. They were also harder to find and re-capture if they got lost. Often late in the trip mixed teams that included dairy cows and riding ponies were sometimes hitched up to make a usable team. Trading posts along the way did a thriving business in buying worn down teams at low prices and selling fresh animals. After a few weeks care and good feeding, these same teams could often be resold at a substantial profit.

One or more horses or mules were often included per wagon for riding, hunting, scouting and keeping herd on the animals. Saddles, bridles, hobbles, ropes, harnesses etc. were needed if they had a horse or riding mule, and many men did. Extra harness parts, rope, steel chain and wagon parts were often carried. Steel shoes for oxen, mules or horses and some spare parts for the wagons were carried by most. Tar was often carried to help repair an injured ox's hoof. If the team was properly taken care of, they usually survived the trip in good shape, but if they were pushed too hard for too long they died or became too weak to continue. Many of the "49ers" were in a great rush and often pushed their animals too hard and they had to buy new animals along the way.

Food for the trip had to be compact, lightweight, and nonperishable. The more knowledgeable also brought dried fruit and vegetables to provide some variety (and Vitamin C) and were a known (to many) scurvy prevention. The method of preparing desiccated vegetables was to squeeze them in a press to remove most of their juice and then bake them for several hours in a low temperature oven. The vegetables like dried peas kept well if kept dry and a piece of dried vegetables the size of a fist when put in water and cooked could feed four. The recommended food to take per adult for the four- to six-month trip was 150 pounds (68 kg) of flour, 20 pounds (9.1 kg) of corn meal, 50 pounds (23 kg) of bacon, 40 pounds (18 kg) of sugar, 10 pounds (4.5 kg) of coffee, 15 pounds (6.8 kg) of dried fruit, 5 pounds (2.3 kg) of salt, half a pound (0.25 kg) of saleratus (baking soda), 2 pounds (0.91 kg) of tea, 5 pounds (2.3 kg) of rice, and 15 pounds (6.8 kg) of beans. Condiments like mustard, cinnamon, nutmeg, vinegar, pepper and other spices were usually included. Ex-trappers, ex-army soldiers and Indians often used pemmican made by pounding jerky until it was a coarse meal, putting it into a leather bag and then pouring rendered fat (and sometimes pulverized dried berries) over it—this was very light weight, could keep for months and provided a lot of energy. Some families took along milk cows and goats for milk and chickens (penned in crates tied to the wagons) for eggs and chicken dinners. Additional food like pickles, canned butter, cheese or pickled eggs were occasionally carried, but canned goods were expensive and relatively heavy to carry and food preservation was primitive, so few perishable items could be safely kept for the four to six-month duration of the trip. These provisions were usually kept in water-tight containers and carried inside the covered wagon to minimize getting wet. At river crossings their food usually had to be removed and carried across on a boat or raft to keep it dry—one of the reasons toll bridges or ferries were popular. Meat filled barrels (200 pounds (91 kg)) were often bought and then, to reduce weight, the bacon and ham were usually transferred to bran filled sacks and stuck in the bottom of the wagons to stay as cool as possible—the barrel being discarded. In hot weather bacon and ham was often hauled in large barrels packed in bran so the hot sun would not melt the fat. Medicinal supplies carried usually consisted of salves and ointments, laudanum (about the only effective pain medicine then and much over used), and a few home remedies.

The typical cost of enough food for four people for six months was about $150. The cost of other supplies, livestock, wagons etc. per person could easily double this cost. In the 1840s, $150.00 represented about 150 days worth of work or half a year's typical salary so most of the poor were excluded from travel unless they got a job herding and guarding the livestock or driving a wagon.

The amount of food required was lessened if beef cattle, calves or sheep were taken along for a walking food supply. Prior to the 1870s, vast herds of buffalo in Nebraska provided fresh meat and jerky for the trip. In general, wild game and fish could not be depended on, but when found, were a welcome change in a monotonous diet. Travelers could hunt antelope, buffalo, trout, deer and occasionally sage hens, elk, bear, duck, geese, and salmon along the trail. Many travelers went via Salt Lake City, Utah and the Salt Lake Cutoff to get repairs, fresh or additional supplies, fresh vegetables and fresh livestock.

Cooking along the trail was typically done over a campfire dug into the ground and made of wood, dried buffalo chips, willow or sagebrush—whatever was easily available. After a rain the 'Buffalo chips' were often hard to start on fire. Flint and steel or matches were used to start fires. Cooking equipment was typically light and included only simple cooking utensils such as butcher knives, forks, metal plates and cups, spoons, large spoons, spatulas, ladles, Dutch ovens, pots and pans, grills, spits, coffee pots, pot hooks and an iron tripod to suspend the pans and pots over the fire. Some brought small stoves, but these were often jettisoned along the way as too heavy and unnecessary. The usual meal for breakfast, lunch and dinner eaten by the mostly male Argonauts was bacon/ham, beans, coffee and biscuits/bread/corn bread or flapjacks.

If three or more were traveling together a tent was often included; but most slept on the ground—getting in the wagon only in case of bad weather. Wooden or canvas buckets were brought for carrying water, and most travelers carried canteens or water bags for daily use. One of the first tasks, after unhooking the animals and letting them water and graze, at almost every stop was getting a new supply of water for drinking, cooking and washing. The next task was usually rounding up enough fuel to start a fire for cooking and heating up the coffee. At least one ten gallon water barrel was brought, but it was usually kept nearly empty to minimize weight (some water in it helped prevent it from leaking); it was typically only filled for waterless stretches. Most casks were discarded near the end of trip as too heavy and no longer needed after Forty Mile Desert. Some brought a new invention—an India Rubber combination mattress and water carrier.

Each man typically took a rifle or shotgun and occasional pistol along with the necessary balls, gunpowder and primers for hunting game and protection against snakes and Indians. Many took their fishing gear along—at least lines and hooks as a usable pole could usually be cut from a willow or other bush. Belt knives or folding knives were carried by nearly all men and boys and considered essential. Farm tools such as a plow, pick, shovel, scythe, rake, hoe; plus carpentry tools—saw, hammer, nails, broad axe, mallet, plane were often carried along. Farmers typically took seeds for corn, wheat and other crops. Some even included fruit trees and vines in their loads. Awls, scissors, pins, needles, thread and leather laces to repair clothes, shoes, harnesses, equipment and occasionally people were constantly in use. Spare leather used for repairs was often needed and used. Goggles to keep dust out of eyes were used by some. Storage boxes for food and supplies were often the same height so they could be arranged to give a flat surface inside the wagon for sleeping during bad weather. If the cargo weighed too much, and it often did initially, these boxes were typically discarded and nearly everything put into bags.

Nearly all brought at least two changes of clothes with extra shirts and jackets (wool usually recommended for its toughness and warmth) hats and multiple pairs of boots—two to three pairs often wore out on a trip. Moccasins at $0.50 to $1.00 per pair and buffalo robes at $4.00 to $8.00 each were often bought (or traded for equivalent valued items) from Indians encountered on the way. A thin fold-up mattress, blankets, buffalo robes, pillows, canvas or rubber gutta percha ground covers were used for sleeping (usually on the ground) at night. About 25 pounds (11 kg) of soap was recommended for a party of four for washing, bathing and washing clothes. A washboard and tub was also usually included to aid in washing clothes. Wash days typically occurred once or twice a month or less, depending on availability of good grass, water, fuel and time. Shaving was usually given up for the trip to save on water and bother. Tobacco was popular, both for personal use and for trading with Indians and other pioneers. Some alcohol was typically taken for "medicinal" purposes—and used up along the way. Sometimes an unfolded feather bed mattress was brought for cushioning the ride in the wagon if there were pregnant women or young children along. The wagons had no springs of any kind, and the ride along the trail was very rough—rough enough to churn butter if a cow was brought along. Despite modern depictions where nearly everybody rides, almost nobody unless a child, pregnant wife or injured traveler actually rode long in the wagons; it was too dusty, too rough and too hard on the livestock. Most walked nearly all the way.

Travelers also brought books, Bibles, trail guides, writing quills, and ink and paper for keeping a diary or writing a letter.

Goods, supplies and equipment were often shared by fellow travelers. Other goods that were forgotten, broke or wore out could often be found discarded by someone else along the way or bought from a fellow traveler, post or fort along the way. Equipment and wheel repairs and other goods could often be procured from blacksmith shops established at some forts and some ferries along the way—most did a thriving business. New iron shoes for horses, mules and oxen were often put on by blacksmiths. Emergency supplies, repairs and livestock were often provided by local residents in Oregon, California and Utah for late travelers on the trail who were hurrying to beat the snow and had run out of supplies, broken down or needed fresh animals.

Along the way, non-essential items were often abandoned to lighten the load, or in case of emergency. Many travelers would salvage discarded items, picking up essentials or trading their lower quality items for better ones found along the road. In the early years, the Mormons sent scavenging parties back along the trail to salvage as much iron and other supplies as possible and haul it to Salt Lake City where supplies of all kinds were needed. Blacksmiths there could then recycle the salvaged iron to make almost any iron/steel object needed. Others would use discarded wagons, wheels and furniture as firewood. During the 1849 gold rush, Fort Laramie was known as "Camp Sacrifice" because of the large amounts of merchandise discarded nearby. Travelers had pushed along the relatively easy path to Fort Laramie with their 'luxury' items but discarded them before the difficult mountain crossing ahead and after discovering that many items could be purchased at the forts or located for free along the way. Many of the smarter travelers carried their excess goods to Salt Lake City where they could trade them for new supplies or money.

Some professional tools used by surgeons, blacksmiths, carpenters, farmers, etc. were carried by nearly all. Shovels, crow bars, picks, hoes, mattocks, saws, hammers, axes and hatchets were used to clear or make a road through trees or brush, cut down the banks to cross a wash or steep banked stream, build a raft or bridge, or repair the wagon where necessary. In general, as little road work as possible was done. Travel was often along the top of ridges to avoid the brush and washes common in many valleys. Because the wagons tipped over easily on a side hill they were often dragged straight up a steep hill, with multiple teams if necessary and then skidded straight down the opposite side with chained up wheels if required.

== Routes ==
The routes of the California Trail encompass the extensive network of overland paths used by 19th-century emigrants travelling to California, primarily between 1841 and 1869. While the main California Trail followed the Platte, Sweetwater, and Humboldt river valleys, numerous branches, cutoffs, and feeder routes evolved to accommodate changing geography, seasonal conditions, and emigrant needs. These included the Truckee Trail, Carson Trail, Salt Lake Cutoff, Sublette-Greenwood Cutoff, Applegate–Lassen Trail, and the Central Overland Route, among others.

The trail system began at various Missouri River towns—such as Independence, St. Joseph, Kanesville, and Omaha—and extended westward through Nebraska, Wyoming, Utah, Idaho, and Nevada. Emigrants faced challenges including cholera outbreaks, desert crossings, and steep mountain passes. Key landmarks included Fort Kearny, South Pass, Independence Rock, and the Forty Mile Desert. The final leg required crossing the Sierra Nevada via routes like Donner Pass, Carson Pass, and Roller Pass.

By 1869, the completion of the transcontinental railroad rendered most of these routes obsolete for mass migration, though they continued to serve freight, stagecoach, and telegraph traffic. Today, many segments are preserved as historic trails and scenic byways.

== Statistics ==
=== Immigrants ===
Estimated California Oregon Mormon Trail Immigrants
Year	Oregon	California	Utah	Total
1834–39	20	-	-	20
1840	13	-	-	13
1841	24	34	-	58
1842	125	-	-	125
1843	875	38	-	913
1844	1,475	53	-	1,528
1845	2,500	260	-	2,760
1846	1,200	1,500	-	2,700
1847	4,000	450	2,200	6,650
1848	1,300	400	2,400	4,100
Tot to '49	11,512	2,735	4,600	18,847
1849	450	25,000	1,500	26,950
1850	6,000	44,000	2,500	52,500
1851	3,600	1,100	1,500	6,200
1852	10,000	50,000	10,000	70,000
1853	7,500	20,000	8,000	35,500
1854	6,000	12,000	3,200	21,200
1855	500	1,500	4,700	6,700
1856	1,000	8,000	2,400	11,400
1857	1,500	4,000	1,300	6,800
1858	1,500	6,000	150	7,650
1859	2,000	17,000	1,400	20,400
1860	1,500	9,000	1,600	12,100
Total	53,000	200,300	43,000	296,300
1834–60	Oregon	California	Utah	Total
1861	–	–	3,148	5,000
1862	–	–	5,244	5,000
1863	-	–	4,760	10,000
1864	-	–	2,626	10,000
1865	-	–	690	20,000
1866	-	–	3,299	25,000
1867	-	–	700	25,000
1868	-	–	4,285	25,000
Total	80,000	250,000	70,000	400,000
1834–67	Oregon	California	Utah	Total

Some of the trail statistics for the early years were recorded by the U.S. Army at Fort Laramie, Wyoming, from about 1849 to 1855. None of these original statistical records have been found, as the army lost them or destroyed them. Some diary references to these records and some partial written copies of the Army records as recorded in several diaries have survived. Emigration to California spiked considerably due to the 1849 gold rush. Following the discovery of gold, California remained the destination of choice for most emigrants on the trail up to 1860, with almost 200,000 people traveling there between 1849 and 1860.

Travel after 1860 is even less well known as the U.S. Civil War caused considerable disruptions on the trail. Many of the people on the trail in 1861–1863 were fleeing the war and its attendant drafts in both the south and the north. Trail Historian Merrill J. Mattes has estimated the number of emigrants for 1861–1867 given in the total column of the above table.

These estimates, however, may be low, since they only amount to an extra 125,000 people, and the 1870 census numbers show an increase of 200,000. This ignores most of California's population increase from the excellent sea and rail connections across Panama that existed by then.

Mormon emigration records after 1860 are reasonably well known, as newspaper and other accounts in Salt Lake City give most of the names of emigrants that arrived each year from 1847 to 1868. Gold and silver strikes in Colorado, Oregon, Idaho, Nevada and Montana also caused a considerable increase in people using the trail(s) often in directions different from the original trail users.

Though the numbers are significant in the context of the times, far more people chose to remain at home in the 31 states. Between 1840 and 1860, the population of the United States rose by 14 million, yet only about 300,000 decided to make the trip. Between 1860 and 1870 the U.S. population increased by seven million with about 350,000 of this increase being in the Western states. Many were discouraged by the cost, effort and danger of the trip. Western scout Kit Carson reputedly said, "The cowards never started and the weak died on the way." According to several sources 3–10% of the immigrants are estimated to have perished on the way west.

=== Western census data ===
Census Population of western States
State	1870	1860	Difference
California	560,247	379,994	180,253
Nevada	42,491	6,857	35,634
Oregon	90,923	52,465	38,458
Colorado*	39,684	34,277	5,407
Idaho*	14,990	-	14,990
Montana*	20,595	–	20,595
Utah*	86,789	40,273	46,516
Washington*	23,955	11,594	12,361
Wyoming*	9,118	-	9,118
Totals	888,792	525,460	363,332
*Territories			

These census numbers show a 363,000 population increase in the western states and territories between 1860 and 1870. Some of this increase is due to a high birth rate in the western states and territories, but most is due to emigrants moving from the east to the west and new immigration from Europe. Much of the increase in California and Oregon is due to emigration by ship, as there were fast and reasonable low-cost transportation via east and west coast steam ships and the Panama Railroad after 1855. The census numbers imply at least 200,000 emigrants (or more) used some variation of the California/Oregon/Mormon/Bozeman trail(s) to get to their new homes in the 1860–1870 decade.

=== Costs ===
The cost of traveling over the California or Oregon trail and its extensions varied from nothing to a few hundred dollars per person. Women seldom went alone outside of family groups and were a distinct minority in the West for decades. The cheapest way to travel the trail was to hire on to help drive the wagons or herds, allowing one to make the trip for nearly nothing or even make a small profit. Those with capital could often buy livestock in the Midwest and drive the stock to California or Oregon and usually make good money doing it. About 60–80% of the travelers were farmers, and as such already owned a wagon, livestock team and many of the necessary supplies, this lowered the cost of the trip to about US$50 (equivalent to $1,800 in 2025) per person for six months food and other items. Families often planned for a trip months in advance and made many of the extra clothing and other items needed. Individuals buying most of the needed items would end up spending between US$150 (equivalent to $5,400 in 2025) and US$300 (equivalent to $10,700 in 2025) per person. Some who traveled in grand style with several wagons and servants could spend much more.

As the trail matured, additional costs for ferries and toll roads were thought to have been about US$30 (equivalent to $1,100 in 2025) per wagon or about $10/person.

=== Deaths ===
Estimated Oregon-California-Mormon Trail Deaths
Cause	Estimated deaths
Cholera^{1}	6,000–12,500
Indian attacks^{2}	3000–4500
Freezing^{3}	300–500
Run overs^{4}	200–500
Drownings^{5}	200–500
Shootings^{6}	200–500
Scurvy^{7}	300–500
Accidents with Animals^{8}	100–200
Miscellaneous^{9}	200–500
Total Deaths	9,700–21,000
See Notes

The route West was arduous and filled with many dangers, but the number of deaths on the trail is not known with any precision, and there are only wildly varying estimates. The estimates are made even harder by the common practice then of burying people in unmarked graves that were intentionally disguised to avoid them being dug up by animals or Indians. Graves were often put in the middle of a trail and then run over by their livestock to make them difficult to find. Diseases like cholera were the main killer of trail travelers with up to 3% (or more) of all travelers (6,000 to 12,000+ total) dying of cholera in the cholera years of 1849 to 1855. Indian attacks were probably the second leading cause of death with about 500 to 1,000 being killed from 1841 to 1870. Other common causes of death included: freezing to death (300–500), drowning in river crossings (200–500), getting run over by wagons (200–500), and accidental gun deaths (200–500).

A significant number of travelers were suffering from scurvy by the end of their trips. Their typical daily diet of flour, dried corn and salted pork/bacon for months on end had very few anti-scurvy ingredients. Scurvy is a nutritional deficiency disease that can lead to death if not treated. Treatment consists of a proper diet. A known scurvy prevention, as worked out by most navies in the 18th century, was found in a diet that contained dried and fresh fruit or vegetables (as finally discovered in 1932—vitamin C rich foods). The diet in the mining camps was also initially poor in fresh or dried vegetables and fruit, which indirectly led to early deaths of many Argonauts. Some believe scurvy deaths from poor nutrition may have rivaled cholera as a killer, with most deaths occurring after they reached California. In a few years, as the gold strikes continued, nearly any and all foods were grown or imported into California—for sale if you had the gold. How to prevent and treat scurvy was common knowledge in some circles but far from universally known, taught or appreciated as the hazard it was. The Chinese Argonauts with their insistence on many more vegetables in their diet fared much better.

Accidents with animals serious enough to cause death include kicks by animals (getting hit by a shod hoof could be deadly), falling off the horse or mule and hitting your head, getting hit by a falling horse or mule, stampedes, bear attacks, and wounded animal attacks. These probably numbered from 100 to 200 or more deaths along the trail from 1847 to 1869. Because of the large number of animals on the trail, and their close interaction with people, accidents with animals that only resulted in minor injury were much more common.

Miscellaneous deaths included deaths by homicides, lightning strikes, childbirths, snake bites, flash floods, falling trees, and wagon wrecks. These probably numbered from 200 to 500 deaths or more along the trail.

According to an evaluation by Trail Authority John Unruh, a 4% death rate or 16,000 out of 400,000 total pioneers on all trails may have died on the trail while making the trip.

== Legacy ==
One of the main enduring legacies of the Oregon and California Trails is the expansion of the United States territory to the West Coast. Without the many thousands of United States settlers in Oregon and California with their "boots on the ground" and more thousands on their way each year, it is highly unlikely that this would have occurred. Surprising to some, the Oregon and California Trails were both established as known emigrant routes in 1841 by the same emigrant party. In 1841 the Bartleson–Bidwell Party group set out for California, but about half the party left the original group at Soda Springs, Idaho, and proceeded to the Willamette Valley in Oregon and the other half proceeded on to California. During pre-American Civil War "Bleeding Kansas" skirmishes between Kansas and Missouri raiders, the jumping off points for westward-bound wagon trains shifted northward towards Omaha, Nebraska. The trail branch John Fremont followed from Westport Landing to the Wakarusa Valley south of Lawrence, Kansas, became regionally known as the California Road.

Part of the same general route of the trail across Nevada was used for the Central Pacific portion of the first transcontinental railroad. In the 20th century, the route was used for modern highways, in particular U.S. Highway 40 and later Interstate 80. Ruts from the wagon wheels and names of emigrants, written with axle grease on rocks, can still be seen in the City of Rocks National Reserve in southern Idaho.

== See also ==
- California Road
- Emigrant Trail in Wyoming
- Landmarks of the Nebraska Territory
- Mormon Trail
- Oregon Trail
- Trailside Center museum in Kansas City, Missouri
- Westward the Women

== Notes ==
The California U.S. Census of 1850 showed 92,597 residents. To this should be added residents from San Francisco, (the largest city in the state) Santa Clara, and Contra Costa counties whose censuses were burned up or lost and not included in the totals. Newspaper accounts in 1850 (Alta Californian) gives the population of San Francisco at 21,000; The special California state Census of 1852 finds 6,158 residents of Santa Clara county and 2,786 residents of Contra Costa County. The corrected California U.S. 1850 Census is over 120,000. See: U.S. Seventh Census 1850: California

- 1) Cholera—Cholera deaths includes deaths by other 'diseases' of the day like old age, smallpox, typhoid, diphtheria, pneumonia, consumption (tuberculosis), measles, yellow fever, dysentery, whooping cough, scarlet fever, malaria, mumps etc. The trail people were already exposed to these diseases before they left and would have in all likelihood have caught them anyway and are not unique hazards of the trail. There was no effective treatment for many of these diseases then (the germ theory of disease was just gaining acceptance) and little that any doctor of this era could do for those that got them except let them recover on their own or die.
- 2) Indian attacks—Indian attacks increased significantly after 1860 when most of the army troops were withdrawn and miners and ranchers began fanning out all over the country often encroaching on Indian territory. Increased attacks along the Humboldt lead to most travelers taking the Central Nevada Route across Nevada.
- 3) Freezing—For examples of freezing deaths see: Donner Party and Willie and Martin handcart companies for three major winter disasters.
- 4) Run overs—Run overs by wagons were a major cause of death, despite the wagons only averaging 2–3 miles per hour. The wagons couldn't easily be stopped and people, particularly children, were often trying to get on and off the wagons while they were moving—not always successfully. Another hazard was getting pulled under the wagon wheels by loose clothing getting caught in the wheels. The iron wheels on the wagons were not very forgiving.
- 5) Drownings—Drownings at river crossings probably peaked in 1849 and 1850 when young, impatient men were the predominant population on the trail. Later more family groups started traveling as well as many more ferries and bridges being put in—fording a dangerous river became much less common and dangerous. Surprisingly few people were taught to swim in this era.
- 6) Shooting deaths—Accidental shootings declined significantly after Fort Laramie as people became more familiar with their weapons and often just left them in their wagons. Carrying around a ten-pound rifle all day soon became tedious and usually unnecessary as the perceived Indian threat faded and hunting opportunities receded.
- 7) Scurvy deaths—Scurvy, as such, was not often listed as a cause of death, but reading the reason they died leads to the conclusion that scurvy was probably the major cause of death—particularly in the last month on the trail.
- 8) Accidents with animals serious enough to cause death were almost inevitable given the number of people and animals involved. There were probably over three animals on the trails to each traveler.
- 9) Miscellaneous deaths—Miscellaneous deaths is a large catch-all for other deaths on the trail and may underestimate the true number.

== Bibliography ==
- Adams, Kenneth C., ed. From Trails to Freeways. California Highways and Public Works. 1950. (Centennial Edition)
- Andrews, Thomas F. Ho! For Oregon and California!: An Annotated Bibliography of Published Advice to the Emigrant, 1841–47. Princeton University Library Chronicle 33 (Autumn 1971): 41–64. ASIN: B000722E5U
- Bagley, Will. So Rugged and Mountainous: Blazing the Trails to Oregon and California, 1840–1848. Norman, Okla: University of Oklahoma Press, 2010.
- Bancroft, Hubert Howe. History of California 1825–1890 (vol. 18–24. index in vol. 24). San Francisco, The History Company Publishers. 1886–1890 (Google Books)
- Bryant, Edwin. What I Saw in California (1848). Reprinted, Lincoln and London: University of Nebraska Press, 1985. ISBN 978-0-217-90418-6. (eBook)
- Bruff, Joseph Goldsborough. Gold Rush: The Journals, Drawings, and other Papers of J. Goldsborough Bruff. 2 vols. New York: Columbia University Press, 1944.
- Cramer, Howard Ross. The California Trail in Idaho: The Salt Lake Cutoff. Burley, ID: Burley District, U.S. Bureau of Land Management, 1974. ASIN: B0006YD7E6
- Fremont, John C., Col. U.S. Army. The Exploring Expedition to the Rocky Mountains, Oregon and California To Which Is Added a Description of the Physical Geography of California, with Recent Notices of the Gold Region from the Latest and Most Authentic Sources. (1848) (free eBook)
- Fremont, John C., Col. U.S. Army. Map of Oregon and Upper California. (1848). Wendell and Van Benthuysen Washington. reissued 1857.
- Greeley, Horace. An Overland Journey from New York to San Francisco in the Summer of 1859. XXXIV.(eBook)
- Hayes, Derek. Historical Atlas of California. University of California Press. (October 30, 2007). ISBN 978-0-520-25258-5
- Hill, William. California Trail Yesterday and Today: A Pictorial Journey. Boise: Tamarack Books, 1986. ISBN 978-0-87108-712-6
- Holliday, J. S., ed. The World Rushed In: The California Gold Rush Experience, An Eyewitness Account of a Nation Heading West. New York: Simon and Schuster, 1981. reissued by University of Oklahoma Press (November 2002). ISBN 978-0-8061-3464-2
- Howard, Thomas Frederick. Sierra Crossing: First Roads to California. University of California Press. 1998; ISBN 0-520-20670-3
- Kerswill, Roy. A Pictorial Story of the Oregon – California Trail, Heritage Associates. 1st edition (February 1996). ISBN 978-0-9650703-0-0
- Koeppel, Elliot H. The California Gold Country: Highway 49 Revisited.
- Landon, Michael N., ed. The Journals of George Q. Cannon, vol. 1: To California in '49. Salt Lake City: Deseret Book, 1999. reissued by Shadow Mountain (January 1, 2000). ISBN 978-1-57345-465-0
- Levy, Jo Ann. They Saw the Elephant. Women in the California Gold Rush. Hamden: Archon Press, 1990. reissued by University of Oklahoma Press (September 1992). ISBN 978-0-8061-2473-5
- Lewis, Oscar. Sutter's Fort: Gateway to the Gold Fields. Englewood Cliffs, NJ: Prentice-Hall, 1966. ASIN B0026EDDW0
- Lienhard, Heinrich. "Wenn Du absolut nach Amerika willst, so gehe in Gottesnamen!", Erinnerungen an den California Trail, John A. Sutter und den Goldrausch 1846–1849. Herausgegeben von [edited by] Christa Landert, mit einem Vorwort von [foreword by] Leo Schelbert. Zürich: Limmat Verlag, 2010, 2011. ISBN 978-3-85791-504-8
- Mattes, Merrill. The Great Platte River Road. Lincoln & London: University of Nebraska Press, 1969. reissued by University of Nebraska Press. Revised edition (November 1, 1987). ISBN 978-0-8032-8153-0
- McGlashan, Charles F. History of the Donner Party, A Tragedy of the Sierra. San Francisco: A. L. Bancroft, 1880. Reprint, Fresno, CA: California History Books, 1973. reissued by Abdul Press (November 4, 2008). ISBN 978-1-4437-3839-2
- MacGregor, Greg. Overland: The California emigrant trail of 1841–1870. Publisher: Albuquerque : University of New Mexico Press, 1996. ISBN 978-0-8263-1704-9
- Meldahl, Keith Heyer. Hard Road West: History and Geology along the Gold Rush Trail. University of Chicago Press. Reprint edition (September 15, 2008) ISBN 978-0-226-51962-3
- Meyers, Sandra L., ed. Ho For California—Women's Overland Diaries from the Huntington Library. San Marino: Henry E. Huntington Library and Art Gallery, 1980. ISBN 978-0-87328-103-4
- Moffat, Gwen. Hard Road West: Alone on the California Trail. Littlehampton Book Services Ltd (March 26, 1981) ISBN 978-0-575-02943-9
- Morgan, Dale L. The Humboldt: Highroad of the West. The Rivers of America Series. New York: Rinehart, 1943. Reprint Lincoln: University of Nebraska Press, 1985.
- Morgan, Dale, ed. Overland in 1846: Diaries and Letters of the California-Oregon Trail. Georgetown, CA.: Talisman Press, 1963. reprint ed., Lincoln & London, University of Nebraska Press, 1993. 2 vol set ASIN: B001VO7J5I
- Newell, Olive. Tail of the Elephant: The Emigrant Experience on the Truckee Route of the California Trail, 1844–1852. A California Sesquicentennial Publication. Nevada City, CA: Nevada County Historical Society, 1997. ISBN 978-0-915641-09-3
- Nunis, Doyce B. Jr., ed. The Bidwell-Bartleson Party: 1841 California Emigrant Adventure: The Documents and Memoirs of the Overland Pioneers. Santa Cruz, CA: Western Tanager Press, 1991. ISBN 978-0-934136-32-7
- Owens, Kenneth N. The Mormon-Carson Emigrant Trail in Western History. Montana, Magazine of Western History 42 (Winter 1992): 14–27.
- Petersen, Jesse G. Route for the Overland Stage: James H. Simpson's 1859 Trail Across the Great Basin. # Utah State University Press. 2008. ISBN 978-0-87421-693-6
- Pritchard, James A. The Overland Diary of James A. Pritchard from Kentucky to California in 1849. Denver: Fred A. Rosenstock Co., 1959. ASIN: B002VRK100
- Rieck, Richard L. Geography of the California Trails: Part I. Overland Journal 11 (Winter 1993): 12–22.
- Smedley, William (1836–1926). Across the plains in '62. diary
- Stewart, George. The California Trail: An Epic With Many Heroes. New York: McGraw Hill, 1962. reprint ed., Lincoln & London: University of Nebraska Press, 1983. reissued by Bison Books (August 1, 1983). ISBN 978-0-8032-9143-0
- Unruh, John David (1993). The Plains Across: The Overland Emigrants and the Trans-Mississippi West, 1840–60. University of Illinois Press. ISBN 978-0-252-06360-2.
- Ward, D. B., (1838– ). Across the plains in 1853. diary.
- White, Richard. It's Your Misfortune and None of My Own. A New History of the American West. Norman: University of Oklahoma Press, 1991. reissued by University of Oklahoma Press (September 1993). ISBN 978-0-8061-2567-1
