= Centerville, Virginia =

Centerville, Virginia may refer to:

- Centerville, Accomack County, Virginia
- Centerville, Augusta County, Virginia
- Centreville, Fairfax County, Virginia
- Centerville, Goochland County, Virginia
- Centerville, Halifax County, Virginia
- Centerville, Montgomery County, Virginia
