= Centerville, Georgia (disambiguation) =

Centerville, Georgia is a city in Houston County, Georgia, United States.

Centerville is also the name of the following Georgia communities:

- Centerville, Charlton County, Georgia
- Centerville, Elbert County, Georgia
- Centerville, Gwinnett County, Georgia
- Centerville, Talbot County, Georgia
- Centerville, Wilkes County, Georgia
