= Centerville, Alpine County, California =

Centerville
- Former settlement
- Location in California Centerville (the United States)
- Coordinates: 38°37′52″N 119°43′24″W
- Country: United States
- State: California
- County: Alpine
- Elevation: 5,951 ft (1,814 m)

Centerville is a former settlement in Alpine County, California, United States.

== History ==
Located along a stage coach route between Silver King Valley and the East Fork of the Carson River, Centerville was a commercial hub during the 1850s and 1860s. Described as a "small village" with stores, a tavern, and a hotel called the Centerville House, Centerville supplied local mines with lumber for flumes, bridges, tunnels, fencing, buildings and heating. Richardson's sawmill was located at Centerville during the 1860s.

In 1864, in an election to determine the Alpine County seat, Markleeville received the most votes, beating out Centerville and two other competing towns. Fire destroyed the home of the town's butcher—located at the corner of Montgomery and Jackson streets—in 1872, and "the rest of the town soon faded away". Little remains of the original settlement. A plaque documenting the history of Centerville was installed in 2013 by E Clampus Vitus, a fraternal organization. The site is now occupied by the Centerville Flat campground.
