= Centerville, California =

Centerville may refer to:

- Centerville, Alameda County, California, now part of Fremont, California
- Centerville, Alpine County, California
- Centerville, Butte County, California
- Centerville, El Dorado County, California
- Centerville, Fresno County, California
- Centerville, Humboldt County, California
- Centerville, Modoc County, California, now part of California Pines, California
- Centerville, Shasta County, California
- Centerville, Sierra County, California
