= West Fork Carson River =

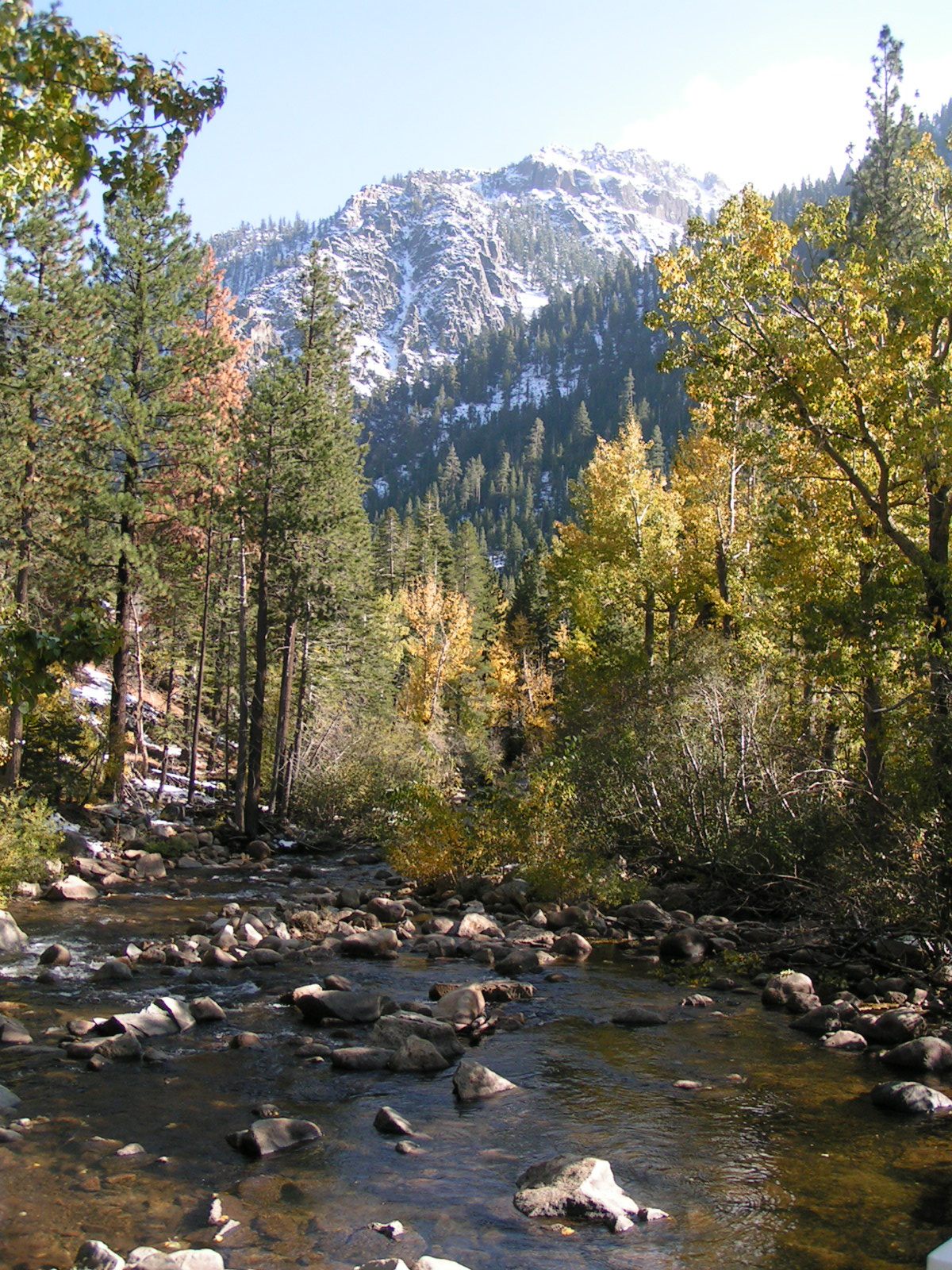
- Near Hope Valley

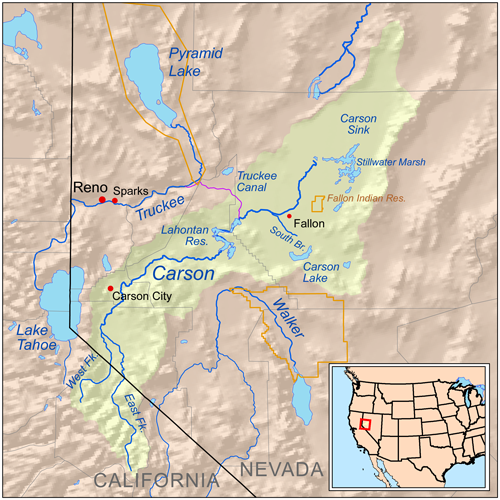
- Map of the Carson River watershed

Location
- Country: United States
- State: California

Physical characteristics
- Source: Sierra Nevada
  - location: Alpine County, California
  - coordinates: 38°38′38″N 119°56′14″W
  - elevation: 8,404 ft (2,562 m)
- Mouth: Carson River
  - location: Douglas County, Nevada
  - coordinates: 38°59′27″N 119°49′29″W
  - elevation: 4,675 ft (1,425 m)
- Length: 35 mi (56 km)
- Discharge
  - location: Woodfords, CA
  - average: 108 cu ft/s (3.1 m^{3}/s)
  - minimum: 5.3 cu ft/s (0.15 m^{3}/s)
  - maximum: 8,100 cu ft/s (230 m^{3}/s)

The West Fork Carson River is a major tributary of the Carson River, about 35 miles (56 km) long, in Alpine County, California, and Douglas County, Nevada, in the United States.

It rises in the Sierra Nevada of California, at Lost Lakes near Carson Pass in the Mokelumne Wilderness of Humboldt-Toiyabe National Forest. It flows north into Hope Valley where it is joined by SR 88 (Carson Pass Highway), which closely follows the river as it travels toward Nevada. At the northern end of the valley it turns east, flowing through a gorge, before emerging from the mountains near Woodfords. From there it flows north, into the Carson Valley of Nevada, where it joins with the East Fork Carson River at Genoa to form the Carson River.

== See also ==
- List of rivers of California
- List of rivers of Nevada
