= Centerville, Kentucky =

Centerville may refer to several places in Kentucky, generally named for their position near the center of their respective counties:

- Centerville, Bourbon County, Kentucky
- Centerville, Crittenden County, Kentucky, the former county seat of Livingston Co
- Centerville, Scott County, Kentucky
- Kirksville, Kentucky, formerly the "Centerville" in Madison Co.
- Bradfordsville, Kentucky, formerly the "Centerville" in Marion Co.
- Centertown, Kentucky, formerly the "Centerville" in Ohio Co.

== See also ==
- Center, Kentucky, in Metcalfe Co.
- Central City, Kentucky, in Muhlenberg Co.
- Center Point, Kentucky, in Monroe Co.
- Magnolia, Kentucky, formerly "Center Point" in LaRue Co.
- Centerville (disambiguation)
