= East Fork Carson River =

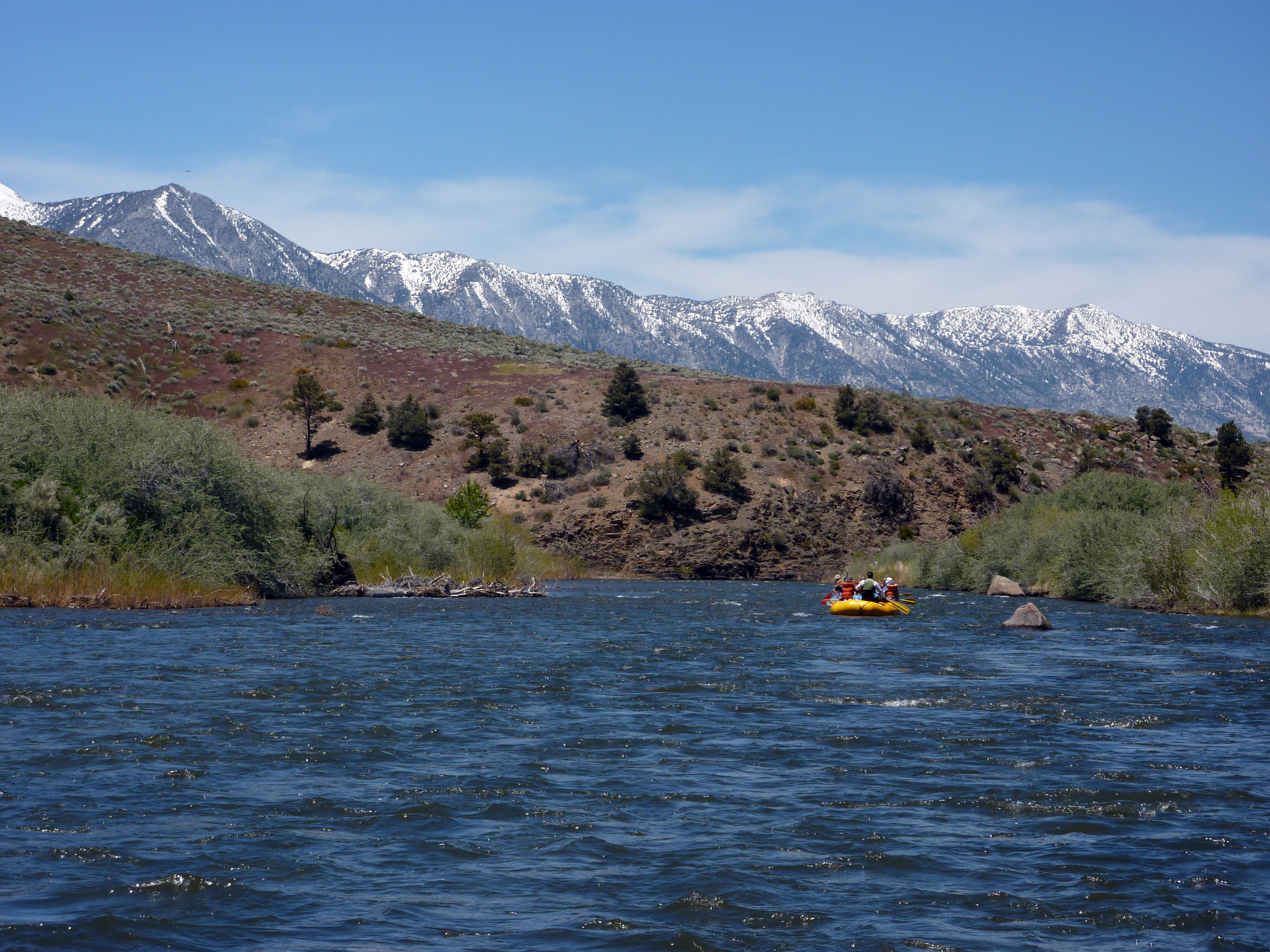
- Rafting the East Fork of the Carson River

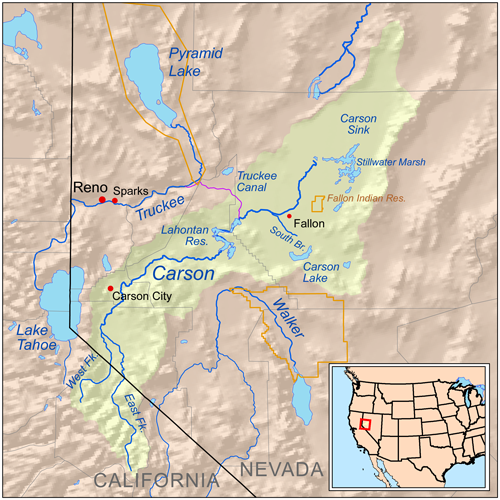
- Map of the Carson River watershed

Location
- Country: United States
- State: California, Nevada

Physical characteristics
- Source: Sierra Nevada
  - location: Alpine County, California
  - coordinates: 38°21′41″N 119°37′36″W
  - elevation: 10,312 ft (3,143 m)
- Mouth: Carson River
  - location: Douglas County, Nevada
  - coordinates: 38°59′27″N 119°49′29″W
  - elevation: 4,675 ft (1,425 m)
- Length: 61 mi (98 km)
- Basin size: 392 sq mi (1,020 km^{2})
- Discharge
  - location: near Gardnerville, NV
  - average: 376 cu ft/s (10.6 m^{3}/s)
  - minimum: 11 cu ft/s (0.31 m^{3}/s)
  - maximum: 20,300 cu ft/s (570 m^{3}/s)

The East Fork Carson River is the largest tributary of the Carson River, flowing through California and Nevada in the western United States. The north-flowing river is 61 miles (98 km) long and drains a mostly rural, mountainous watershed of 392 square miles (1,020 km^{2}).

== Description ==
The river originates at Sonora Peak, in the Sierra Nevada in Alpine County, California. The headwaters of the river are in the Carson-Iceberg Wilderness of the Humboldt-Toiyabe National Forest. It flows north through a U-shaped glacial canyon, dropping over Carson Falls, then continues to the Silver King Valley, where it meets Silver King Creek and turns northwest, flowing to Centerville Flat where it is joined by Silver Creek and turns north. Between here and Markleeville, California the river canyon is followed by parts of SR 4 and SR 89, the Alpine State Highway. At Markleeville it receives a major tributary, Markleeville Creek, before flowing north into Douglas County, Nevada. In Nevada the river enters the agricultural Carson Valley and passes through the Washoe Indian Reservation, past Dresslerville, Gardnerville and Minden. It joins with the West Fork Carson River on the western edge of the valley, near Genoa to form the Carson River. Below this confluence the Carson River continues 131 miles (211 km) to its eventual terminus in the Carson Sink in Churchill County, Nevada.

The United States Bureau of Reclamation (USBR) announced their intention in 1962 to build a ($46.1 million in 2025) dam to provide irrigation water for a Carson Canal and generate 800 kW of power. The waters from the dam would have extended nine miles into California. Neither the canal nor dam was ever built.

== See also ==
- List of rivers of California
- List of rivers of Nevada
