= Centreville, Nova Scotia =

Centreville, Nova Scotia could be the following places in Nova Scotia:

- Centreville, Cape Breton, Nova Scotia in the Cape Breton Regional Municipality
- Centreville, Digby, Nova Scotia in Digby County
- Centreville, Inverness County
- Centreville, Kings, Nova Scotia in Kings County
- Centreville, Shelburne, Nova Scotia in Shelburne County
