= Centerville, Arkansas =

Centerville, Arkansas may refer to:

- Centerville, Faulkner County, Arkansas, an unincorporated community in Faulkner County
- Centerville, Yell County, Arkansas, an unincorporated community and census-designated place in Yell County
