= Centerville, Wisconsin =

Centerville may refer to:

- Centerville, Grant County, Wisconsin, an unincorporated community
- Centerville, Manitowoc County, Wisconsin, a town
- Centerville, St. Croix County, Wisconsin, an unincorporated community
- Centerville, Trempealeau County, Wisconsin, an unincorporated community
