= Centreville, Cape Breton =

Community in Nova Scotia, Canada

Coordinates: 46°13′23.08″N 60°13′43.56″W

Centreville in Nova Scotia

Centreville is a community in the Canadian province of Nova Scotia, located in the Cape Breton Regional Municipality on Cape Breton Island.
