= Centerville, Ohio (disambiguation) =

Centerville, Ohio is a city in Montgomery and Greene Counties in the U.S. state of Ohio.

Centerville, Ohio may also refer to:

- Centerville, Belmont County, Ohio
- Centerville, Clinton County, Ohio or Lees Creek
- Centerville, Gallia County, Ohio
- Centerville, Marion County, Ohio
- Centerville, Wayne County, Ohio

== See also ==
- Center Village, Ohio
