= Centerville, Wilkes County, Georgia =

Unincorporated community in Georgia, U.S.

Coordinates: 33°48′04″N 82°55′22″W

Centerville is an unincorporated community in Wilkes County, in the U.S. state of Georgia.

== History ==
The community was so named due to its relatively central location between Washington and Lexington. Variant names were "Centreville" and "Triplett".
