= Centerville, New Jersey =

Centerville, New Jersey can refer to:

- Centerville, Camden, a neighborhood of Camden
- Centerville, Hunterdon County, New Jersey, an unincorporated community
- Centerville, Mercer County, New Jersey, an unincorporated community
- Centerville, Monmouth County, New Jersey, an unincorporated community

== See also ==
- Centreville Township, New Jersey
