= Centerville High School =

Centerville High School may refer to:

- Centerville Senior High School, Centerville, Indiana
- Centerville High School (Iowa), Centerville, Iowa
- Centerville High School (Louisiana), a high school in Louisiana
- Centerville High School (Texas), a high school in Texas
- Centerville High School (Montana), a high school in Montana
- Centerville High School (Ohio), a public school of secondary education for grades 9–12 located in Centerville, Ohio,

== See also ==
- Centreville High School (disambiguation)
