= Centerville, Pennsylvania =

Centerville/Centreville is the name of several places in the U.S. state of Pennsylvania:

- Centerville, Crawford County, Pennsylvania
- Centerville, Washington County, Pennsylvania
- Centreville, the original name of the village of Penns Creek, Pennsylvania
- Centreville, the original name of the village of Kersey, Pennsylvania
- Centreville, the original name of the borough of Slippery Rock, Pennsylvania
