= Centreville, British Columbia =

Centreville
- Location of Centreville in British Columbia
- Coordinates: 59°16′20″N 129°24′15″W
- Country: Canada
- Province: British Columbia

Centreville is a ghost town in the Cassiar Land District of British Columbia, Canada, northwest of the junction of McDame Creek and the Dease River. It contained cabins and stores, and was a trading centre for miners working on McDame Creek in the 1800s.
