= Carson River Canyon =

Canyon in Nevada

Geology
- Type: Canyon

Geography
- Country: United States
- State: Nevada
- Coordinates: 39.177°N 119.671°W
- Interactive map of Carson River Canyon

The Carson River Canyon is a scenic canyon in Lyon County, Nevada through which the Carson River flows. The city of Carson City, Nevada is currently working to purchase 900 acres of the canyon for open space and recreational purposes.

The canyon was used for the Virginia and Truckee Railroad during the Nevada silver boom. The railroad line is being partially reconstructed for tourism purposes.
