= Centerville, Augusta County, Virginia =

Unincorporated community in Virginia, United States

Centerville, Virginia
- Unincorporated community
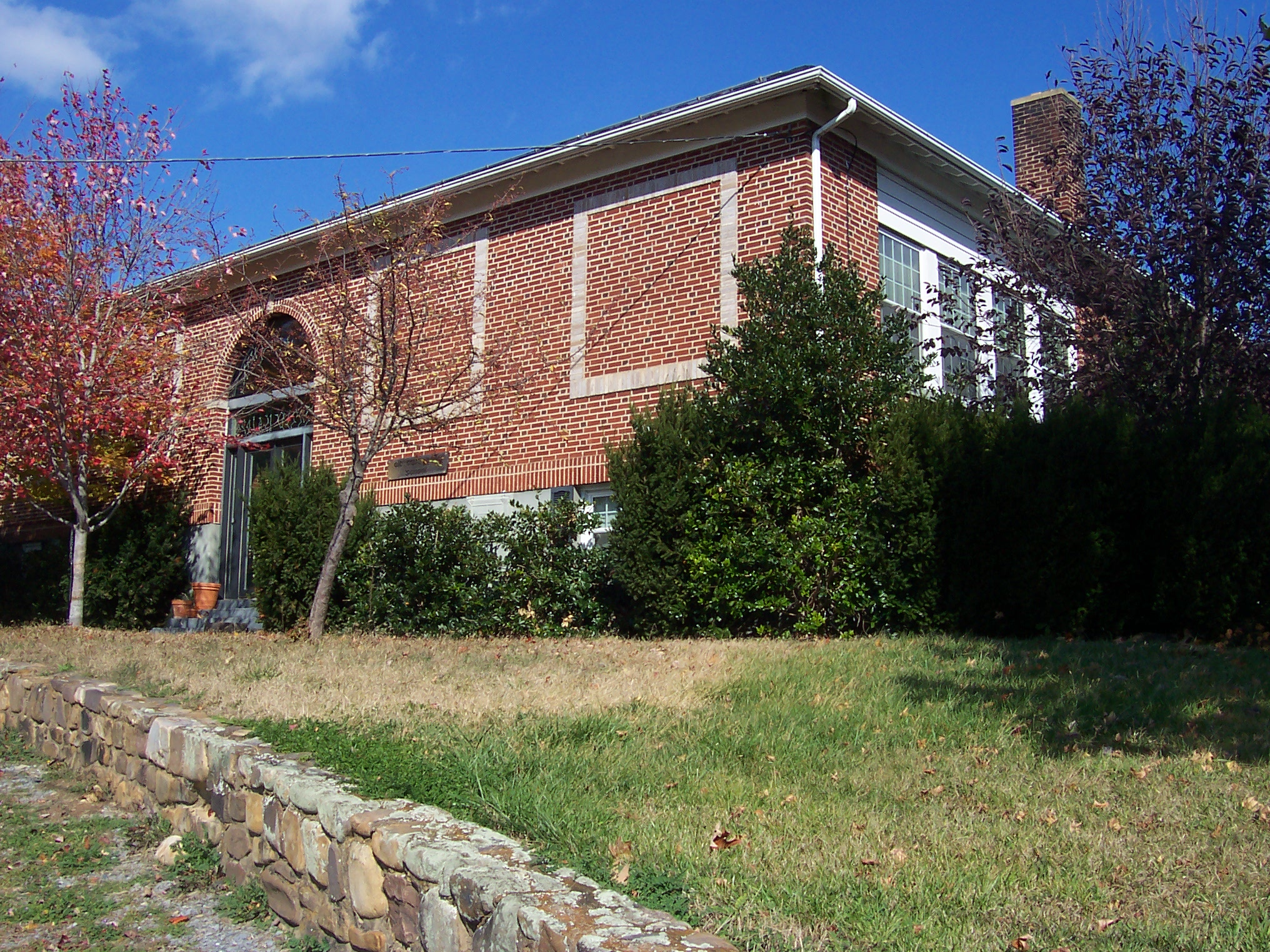
- The old Centerville School, now used as a private residence

- Location within Virginia Location within the United States
- Coordinates: 38°20′18″N 79°00′20″W
- Country: United States
- State: Virginia
- County: Augusta
- Elevation: 1,398 ft (426 m)
- Time zone: UTC-5 (Eastern (EST))
  - Summer (DST): UTC-4 (EDT)
- GNIS feature ID: 1496838

Centerville is an unincorporated community in Augusta County, Virginia, United States. The community is located approximately 13.7 miles (22.0 km) north-northwest of Staunton near the county's northern border.
