= Centerville, Montgomery County, Virginia =

Unincorporated community in Virginia, United States

Centerville
- Unincorporated community
- Location within the state of Virginia Centerville (the United States)
- Coordinates: 37°10′11″N 080°32′18″W
- Country: United States
- State: Virginia
- County: Montgomery
- Elevation: 1,968 ft (600 m)
- Time zone: UTC-5 (Eastern (EST))
  - Summer (DST): UTC-4 (EDT)
- FIPS code: 51-14270
- GNIS feature ID: 1499231

Centerville is an unincorporated community in Montgomery County in the southwestern region of the U.S. commonwealth of Virginia.

The largest employer in the area is Virginia Tech, Virginia's largest university and a national football powerhouse, located in nearby Blacksburg. Montgomery County is considered the "most wired county in the United States" by Reader's Digest. The town maintains its small-town feel with an eclectic collection of boutiques, restaurants and historic sites, while just a mile away high-tech industry prospers in the Virginia Tech Corporate Research Center (CRC).

== Geography ==
Centerville is located at 37°10′11″N 080°32′18″W (37.1698488, -80.5383898).
