= Centreville High School =

Centreville High School may refer to one of the following:

- Centreville High School (Fairfax County, Virginia)
- Centreville High School (Maryland) in Centreville, Maryland
- Centreville High School (Michigan) in Centreville, St. Joseph County, Michigan

== See also ==
- Centerville High School (disambiguation)
