= Centerville, Charlton County, Georgia =

Ghost town

Coordinates: 30°50′35″N 81°58′07″W

Centerville is a ghost town in Charlton County, in the U.S. state of Georgia. It was located along what is today Georgia State Route 40 east of Folkston.

== History ==
Variant names were "Center Village" and "Centre Village". The town's population dwindled when it was bypassed by the railroad following the Civil War. Later in the 19th Century, the Brunswick and Pensacola Railroad passed through the site of Centerville in 1894, but by that time it was too late to be useful for the former community.
