= Centerville City =

Centerville City may refer to:

- Centerville City School District in Ohio
- Centerville City, former name of Centerville, Humboldt County, California
