= Centerville station =

- CB&Q Passenger Depot
- U.S. National Register of Historic Places
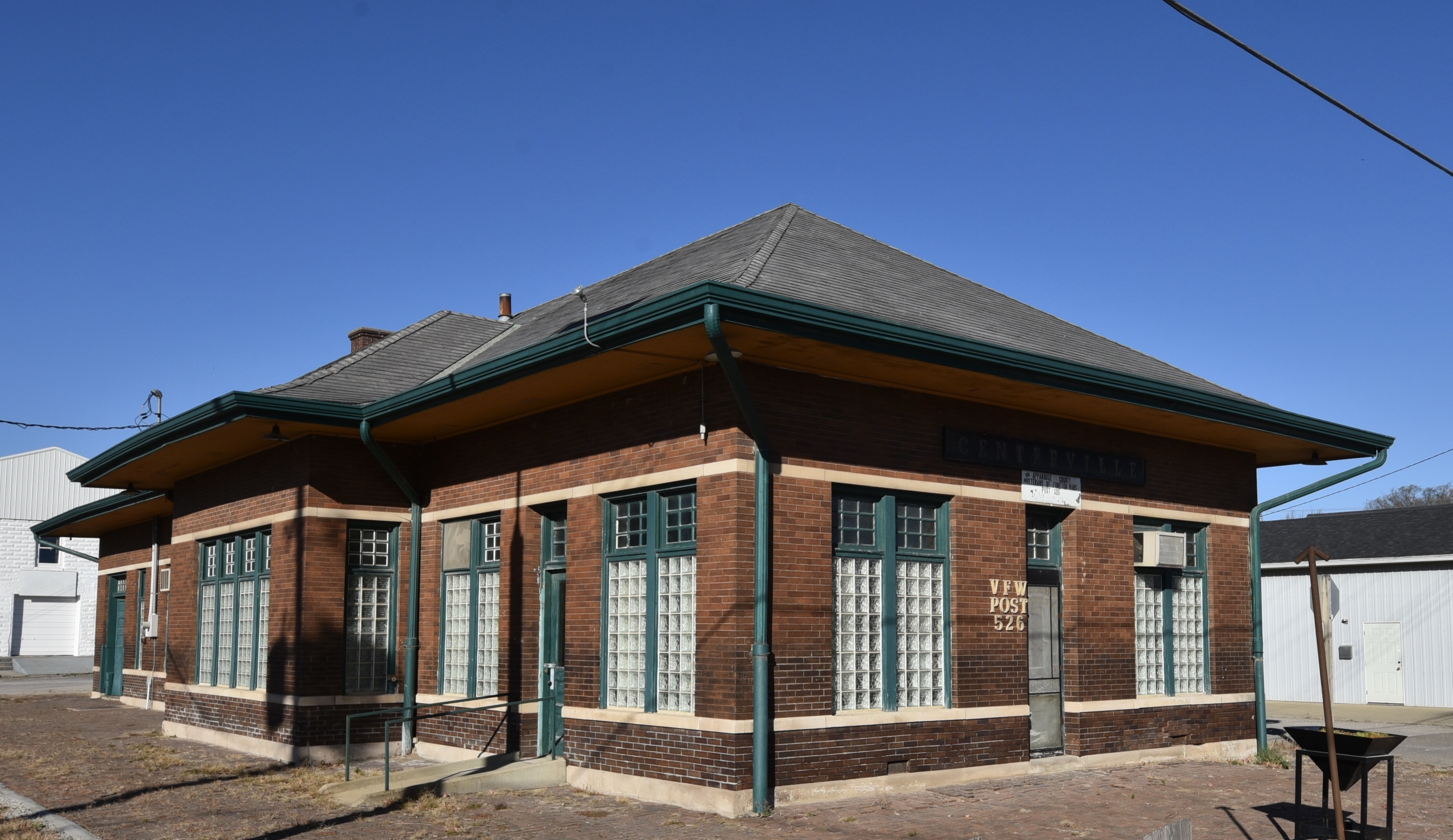

- Location within Iowa Location within the United States
- Location: 1124 S. 18th St. Centerville, Iowa
- Coordinates: 40°43′31″N 92°52′05″W
- Area: less than one acre
- Built: 1911-1912
- Built by: B.S. Staley
- Architect: CB&Q Railroad
- Architectural style: Prairie School; Late 19th and Early 20th Century American Movements
- MPS: Centerville MPS
- NRHP reference No.: 03000833
- Added to NRHP: August 28, 2003

Centerville station, now known as the Appanoose County Post 526 VFW Hall, is an historic train station located in Centerville, Iowa, United States. The Chicago, Burlington and Quincy Railroad (CB&Q) bought the Keokuk & Western Railroad in 1903. Centerville served as a dividing point on the line and by 1910 the people in the town started to plan for a larger station. Its architect is unknown, but the depot was probably designed by a CB&Q architect using fairly standard plans that were used by the railroad at the time. Construction of the Prairie School style building began in July 1911 and it was completed in February of the following year. Local contractor B.S. Staley built the building. The building was used by the CB&Q until 1982. It was bought by the Appanoose County VFW post for their meeting hall in 1990 and it was listed on the National Register of Historic Places in 2003 as the CB&Q Passenger Depot.

Preceding station	Burlington Route	Following station
Brazil toward Clarinda	Clarinda – Alexandria	Sedan toward Alexandria
