= Centerville, Louisiana =

Centerville may refer to places in the U.S. state of Louisiana:

- Centerville, Evangeline Parish, Louisiana
- Centerville, St. Mary Parish, Louisiana
