= Sonora Peak =

Mountain in the American state of California

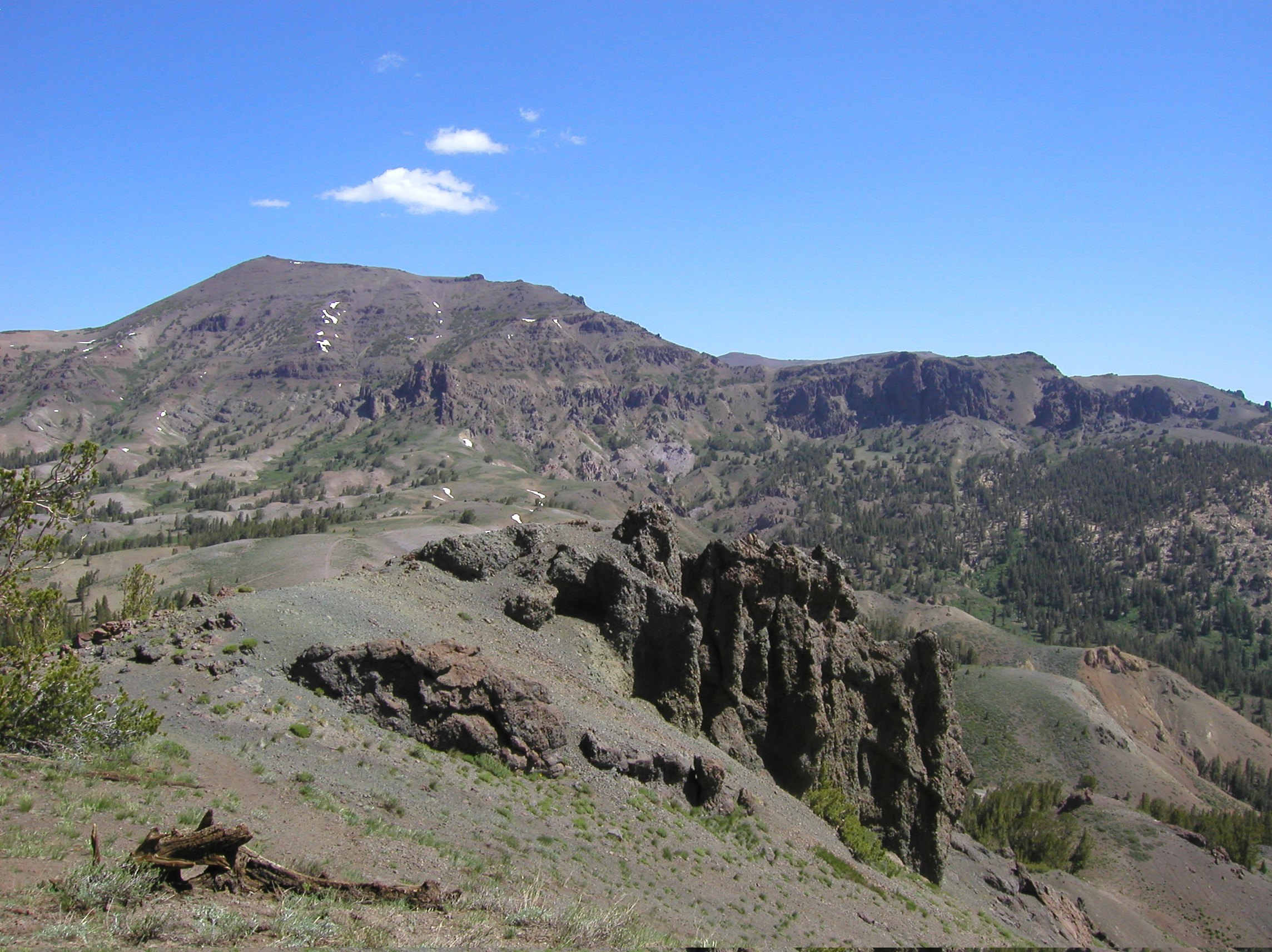
- Southern face of Sonora Peak from Sonora Pass

Highest point
- Elevation: 11,464 ft (3,494 m) NAVD 88
- Prominence: 1,816 ft (554 m)
- Listing: California county high points 10th
- Coordinates: 38°21′14″N 119°38′07″W

Geography
- Location within California
- Location: Alpine and Mono counties, California, U.S.
- Parent range: Central Sierra Nevada
- Topo map: USGS Sonora Pass

Climbing
- Easiest route: Hike, class 1-2

Sonora Peak is a mountain in the Central Sierra Nevada of California north of Sonora Pass. Located on the boundary between Alpine and Mono counties, it is the highest point in Alpine County. Due to the high elevation, most of the precipitation this mountain receives consists of snow.

== Climate ==
There is no weather station at the summit, but this climate table contains interpolated data for an area around the summit. Sonora Peak has a subalpine climate (Köppen Dfc).

Climate data for Sonora Peak 38.3672 N, 119.6096 W, Elevation: 11,106 ft (3,385 m) (1991–2020 normals)
Month	Jan	Feb	Mar	Apr	May	Jun	Jul	Aug	Sep	Oct	Nov	Dec	Year
Mean daily maximum °F (°C)	30.4 (−0.9)	29.5 (−1.4)	32.2 (0.1)	36.6 (2.6)	44.5 (6.9)	54.4 (12.4)	62.9 (17.2)	62.1 (16.7)	56.3 (13.5)	47.0 (8.3)	36.4 (2.4)	30.1 (−1.1)	43.5 (6.4)
Daily mean °F (°C)	21.8 (−5.7)	20.3 (−6.5)	22.5 (−5.3)	25.7 (−3.5)	33.3 (0.7)	42.4 (5.8)	50.5 (10.3)	49.7 (9.8)	44.1 (6.7)	35.8 (2.1)	27.3 (−2.6)	21.7 (−5.7)	32.9 (0.5)
Mean daily minimum °F (°C)	13.2 (−10.4)	11.1 (−11.6)	12.7 (−10.7)	14.8 (−9.6)	22.1 (−5.5)	30.4 (−0.9)	38.1 (3.4)	37.3 (2.9)	31.9 (−0.1)	24.7 (−4.1)	18.2 (−7.7)	13.2 (−10.4)	22.3 (−5.4)
Average precipitation inches (mm)	7.42 (188)	7.05 (179)	6.99 (178)	3.88 (99)	2.35 (60)	0.79 (20)	0.80 (20)	0.78 (20)	0.77 (20)	2.34 (59)	4.83 (123)	7.05 (179)	45.05 (1,145)
Source: PRISM Climate Group

== Hiking ==
One of the most direct routes of ascent starts at Sonora Pass, 2 miles (3 km) south as the crow flies. Starting at the trailhead of the PCT on Sonora Pass, it is about a 2.5-mile (4.0 km) hike with 1,000 feet (300 m) elevation gain to the top of a pass. From there, the easiest and most direct way is to turn northwest and follow the ridge that will lead to the summit. About halfway from the pass to the peak a small trail appears that heads directly to the peak. A second approach to the summit is from nearby Saint Mary's Pass trailhead. This trail approaches the peak from the other side of the mountain (the northwestern side) and is also a class 1 hike.

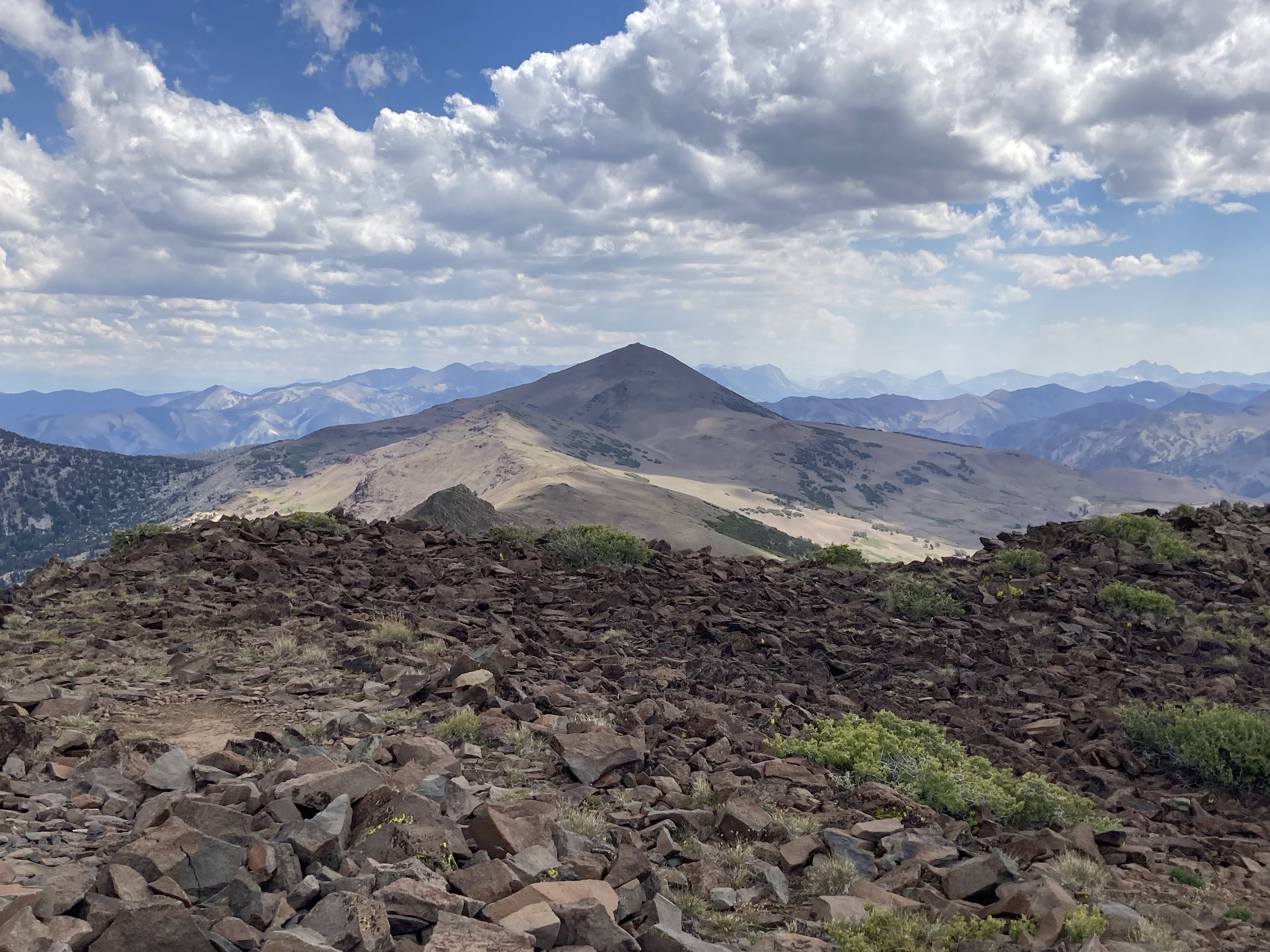
Northern face of Sonora Peak as seen from nearby Stanislaus Peak
