= Lahontan =

Lahontan, La Hontan or la Hontan may refer to:

- Lake Lahontan, an endorheic prehistoric lake in Nevada
- Lahontan Valley, a basin in Churchill County, Nevada
- Lahontan Dam, a dam situated on the Carson River, Nevada
- Lahontan Reservoir, a reservoir on the Carson River in Nevada
- Lahontan State Recreation Area, a public recreation area surrounding Lake Lahontan
- Louis-Armand de Lom d'Arce de Lahontan, Baron de Lahontan (1666 – before 1716), French explorer after whom all the former are named
- Lahontan, Pyrénées-Atlantiques, a commune in the Pyrénées-Atlantiques département of France
