= Lake Tahoe Dam =

Dam in California, United States

Coordinates: 39°10′02″N 120°08′38″W

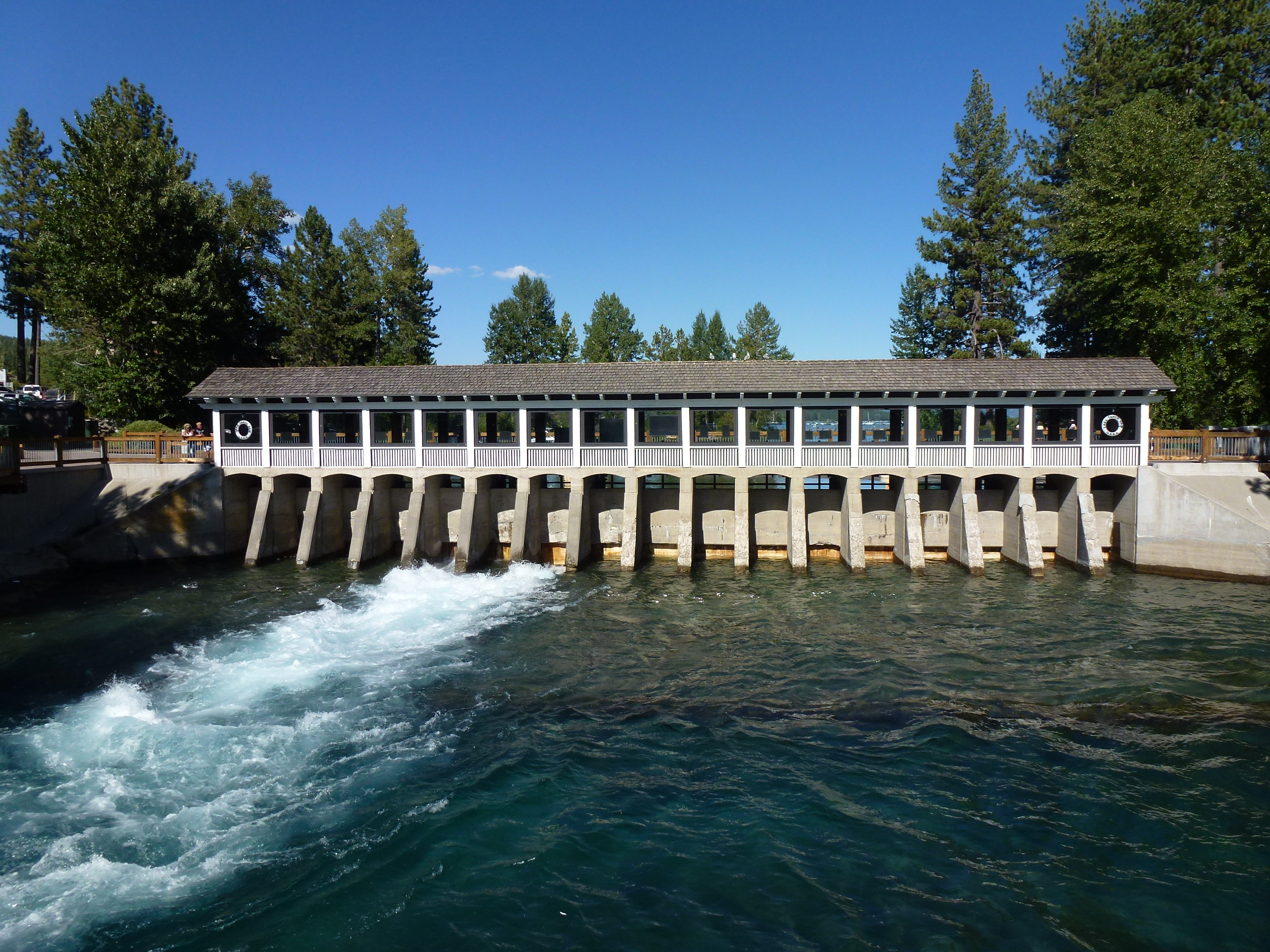
- Interactive map of Lake Tahoe Dam
- Country: United States
- Location: Placer County, California.
- Status: Operational
- Opening date: 1913; 113 years ago

Lake Tahoe Dam is a concrete gravity dam on the Truckee River, at the outlet of Lake Tahoe in Placer County, California.

Tahoe Dam regulates the top six feet of Lake Tahoe, and distributes the water into Tahoe's primary outflow, the Truckee River. The dam is located in Tahoe City and serves as the main storage facility for the U.S. Bureau of Reclamation's Newlands Project that also includes the Lahontan Dam and two diversion dams, providing irrigation water for 55,000 acres (22,000 ha) of cropland mainly in the Lahontan Valley of western Nevada. The present Lake Tahoe dam replaced an older, privately owned dam built in 1870 at roughly the same location.

The dam was built between 1909 and 1913 and stands 18.2 ft (5.5 m) high and 109 ft (33 m) long, raising Lake Tahoe by up to 10.1 ft (3.1 m). Outflows from the dam are regulated by a gated spillway with 17 bays, with a maximum release capacity of 2,100 cubic feet per second (59 m^{3}/s). It is situated 400 feet downstream from the lake's natural shore. This is meant to help hydraulic control during a dry season with low water levels. The reservoir receives water from a catchment of 505 mi^{2} (1,310 km^{2}) and has a maximum storage capacity of 732,000 acre⋅ft (0.903 km^{3}).

== History ==
=== Early controversy ===
In the early 1860s, Russian born and San Francisco based engineer Alexis Waldemar Von Schmidt bought a large amount of land in the Tahoe-Truckee area with the hope of sending water westward to San Francisco via an aqueduct. He created the Lake Tahoe and San Francisco Water Works Company in 1865 in order to see his plan come to life, however Von Schmidt was shut down by California Legislature in 1870. Instead of allowing an aqueduct to be built from Tahoe to San Francisco, the California Legislature granted the Donner Lumber and Boom Company, which was then owned by Mark Hopkins and Leland Stanford, the right to build a dam on Tahoe's outlet. A small dam was then built from lumber and rocks. However, this did not discourage Von Schmidt, who, in the following year, continued to push for the ability to divert water to San Francisco. He eventually proposed his idea to the San Francisco Board of Supervisors, which was to channel the water from the Truckee River to Squaw Valley, which would lead to the North Fork of the American River, and then finally through an aqueduct towards San Francisco. This project, in total would have cost $10 million at the time (today roughly $200 million) and had been approved by the San Francisco city supervisors, but was ultimately shut down by the mayor of San Francisco, who was wary of the possible lawsuits over water rights which could come his way.

=== Newlands Reclamation Act ===
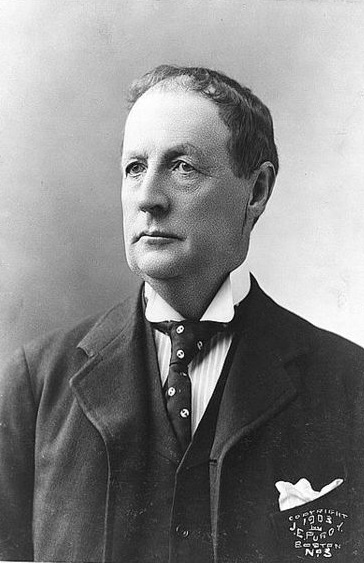
Francis G. Newlands

In 1892, newly-elected House of Representatives member from Nevada, Francis G. Newlands, began advocating for more irrigation in the western United States in order to further the United States' agricultural growth. His advocacy had begun when he first moved to Nevada in 1888 and began to dream up a new irrigation system for the west. Newlands called his project the Truckee Irrigation Project, which ultimately was unsuccessful as a private venture. However, although Newlands did not find success in his short career as an entrepreneur, his quest for more irrigation became part of the reason Newlands was voted into office. It was not until 1901, however, when Theodore Roosevelt became president, that there was any real progress made towards implementing the irrigation systems. With President Roosevelt's support, Representative Newlands was finally able to successfully push his bill through.

On June 17, 1902, Congress passed the Newlands Reclamation Act, thus creating what is now known as the United States Bureau of Reclamation (USBR). The first of five projects created from the Reclamation Act was the Truckee–Carson Project, later renamed the Newlands Project, as Representative Newlands had been the bills main figurehead. Construction for the Newlands Project began in 1903 and they quickly made progress on building the Derby Dam and the Truckee Canal.

==== Newlands Project ====
In 1909, the Newlands Project set out to obtain the rights to the Tahoe Dam, which at that point had been owned by Truckee River General Electric Company. Although an agreement was not fully reached until June 4, 1915, rights of ownership for Tahoe Dam were given to the US government. Rights to control Tahoe Dam and some 14 acres surrounding the outlet was purchased for a total of $139,500 by the federal government. Prior to this change of ownership, both the Truckee River General Electric and the USBR contributed to the replacement of the small original rock-filled wooden dam with a more sustainable concrete slab and buttress structure dam. Tahoe Dam was slightly modernized in 1987 by the Safety of Dams Program, and it is this version of the dam which is still in operation today.

In total, the Newlands Project led to the creation of many irrigation systems within Nevada and California including:

- Lake Tahoe Dam
- Lahontan Dam, reservoir, and power plant
- Truckee Canal
- Carson River Diversion Dam
- Derby Diversion Dam

=== Paiute Tribe lawsuit ===
As the USBR stated intent to repair the Tahoe Dam in 1987 in order to enhance its seismic resistance, the Paiute Tribe took advantage of this occasion to file a lawsuit against the federal government. In what became the Pyramid Lake Paiute Tribe of Indians v. Secretary of the Interior Hodel, the Paiute Tribe fought against how specific operations of the dam negatively impacted Pyramid Lake's endangered cui-iu fish species. The main problem which the Paiute Tribe had identified was that part of the Truckee River naturally flows into Pyramid Lake within the Paiute Reservation. However, with irrigation interference from the U.S. Government, Pyramid Lake received less water than it needed for its ecosystem to thrive. It was found that the endangerment of the cui-ui was directly related to the amount of water within Pyramid Lake. The court decided on August 9, 1989 that water would be stored in the Stampede Reservoir for the purpose of releasing it into Pyramid Lake as needed to partially make up for what water was being lost within the irrigation systems created and sustained by the Newlands Project.

== Local landmark ==
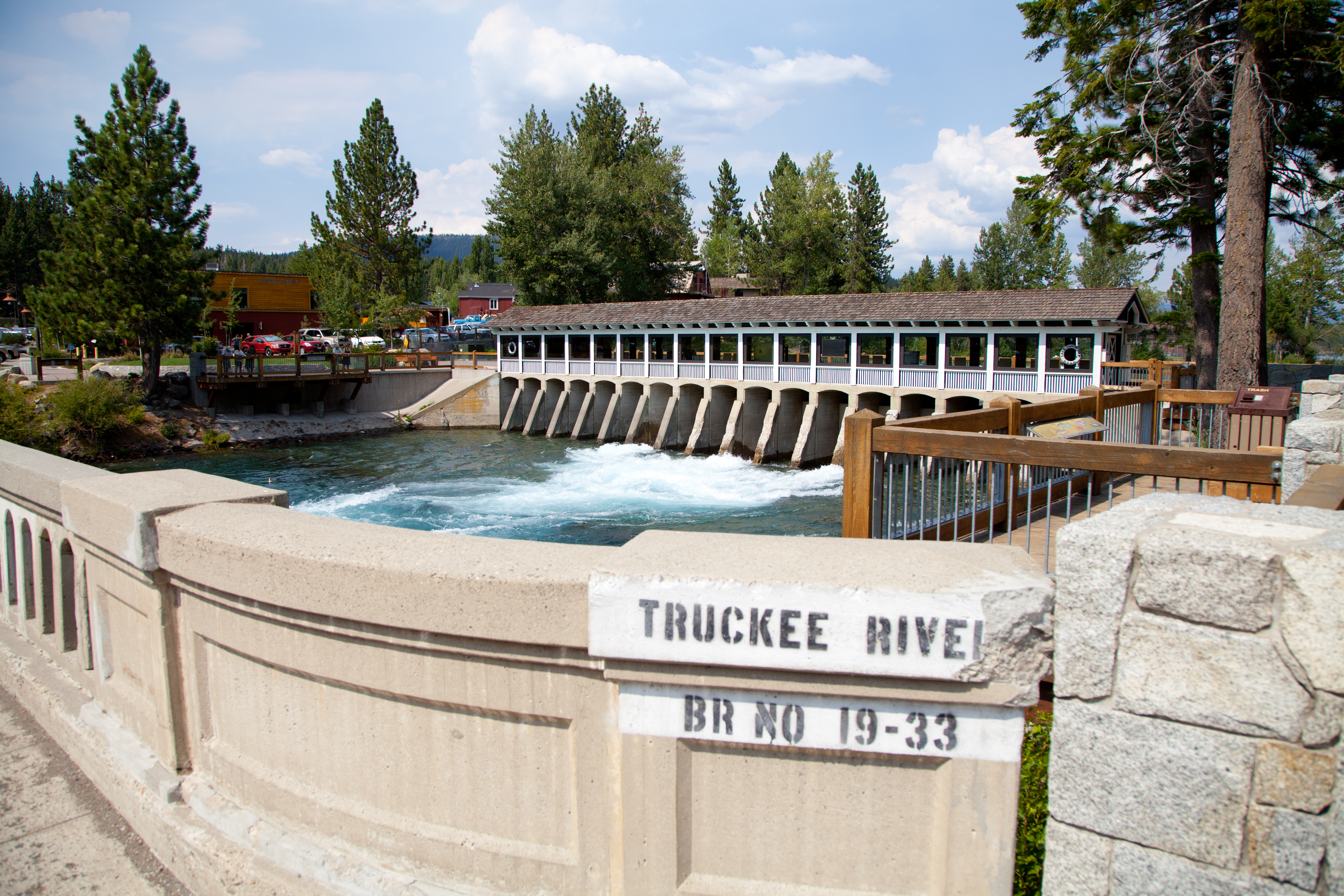
Tahoe Dam from the local landmark, Fanny Bridge

After having been built in the early 1900s, Tahoe Dam has become a local landmark for Tahoe City and the greater Tahoe-Truckee area. It was recognized on a national level and was listed on the National Register of Historic Places on March 25, 1981.

Another landmark associated with Tahoe Dam would be the famed Fanny Bridge, a small two-lane bridge connecting North Shore and West Shore of Lake Tahoe, located in Tahoe City and directly across from Tahoe Dam.

== See also ==
- List of dams and reservoirs in California
- List of largest reservoirs of California
- List of United States Bureau of Reclamation dams
