= SPZ =

SPZ may refer to:

- sporadic permafrost zone, see Permafrost
- subparaventricular zone, a region of the hypothalamus critically involved in sleep/wake regulation
- Silver Springs Airport, Nevada, USA - FID code SPZ
- Springdale Municipal Airport, Arkansas, USA - IATA code SPZ
- SPZ Group, owner of Sarm West Studios music company
