= Lahontan State Recreation Area =

Recreation area in Nevada, United States

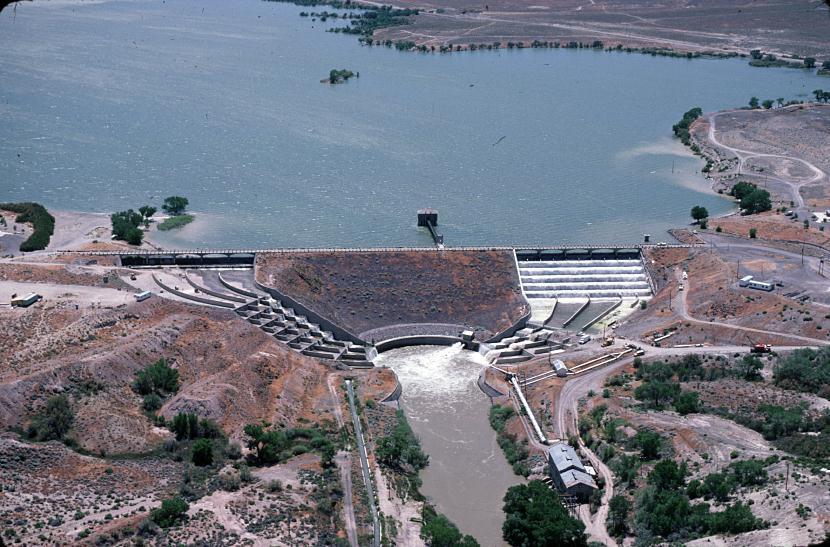
- Lahontan Dam on the Carson River

- Location within Nevada
- Location: Lyon and Churchill counties, Nevada, United States
- Nearest city: Fallon, Nevada
- Coordinates: 39°22′37″N 119°10′3″W
- Area: 28,892.3 acres (11,692.3 ha)
- Elevation: 4,157 ft (1,267 m)
- Established: 1971
- Administrator: Nevada Division of State Parks
- Visitors: 58,838 vehicles (in 2017)
- Designation: Nevada state park
- Website: Official website

Lahontan State Recreation Area is a public recreation area surrounding the Lahontan Reservoir, a 17-mile-long (27 km) impoundment of the Carson River, located approximately 18 miles (29 km) west of Fallon, Nevada. The reservoir features 69 miles (111 km) of shoreline and 11,200 acres (4,500 ha) of water when full. Much of the park lies below 4,000 feet (1,200 m) in elevation and is dominated by high desert sagebrush. Wooded areas of native cottonwoods and willow trees can be found along the shore of the lake. Primary access points to the park are along U.S. Route 50 near the Lahontan Dam and off U.S. Route 95 in the town of Silver Springs. A corridor known as Carson River Ranches connects Lahontan with Fort Churchill State Historic Park.

== History ==
Following passage of the Newlands Reclamation Act of 1902, the Lahontan Dam was constructed along the Carson River between Fallon and Carson City. The dam, measuring 162 feet (49 m) high and 1,700 feet (520 m) long, was completed in 1915. The reservoir was named after ancient Lake Lahontan which covered much of Nevada during the last ice age. Submerged beneath the water were parts of stagecoach routes which existed during the 1800s including Williams Station, the scene of the Battle of Williams Station, a minor skirmish during the Paiute War. Originally operated by Churchill and Lyon counties, Lahontan became a state-operated recreation area in 1971.

== Activities and amenities ==
Park activities include boating, water skiing, fishing and camping. The park has two developed picnicking areas as well as a developed campground at Silver Springs Beach #7. Primitive camping is allowed in most other areas. Multiple trails can be found along the length of the reservoir.
