= List of dams and reservoirs in Nevada =

Following is a list of dams and reservoirs in Nevada.

All major dams are linked below. The National Inventory of Dams defines any "major dam" as being 50 feet (15 m) tall with a storage capacity of at least 5,000 acre-feet (6,200,000 m^{3}), or of any height with a storage capacity of 25,000 acre-feet (31,000,000 m^{3}).

== Dams and reservoirs in Nevada ==
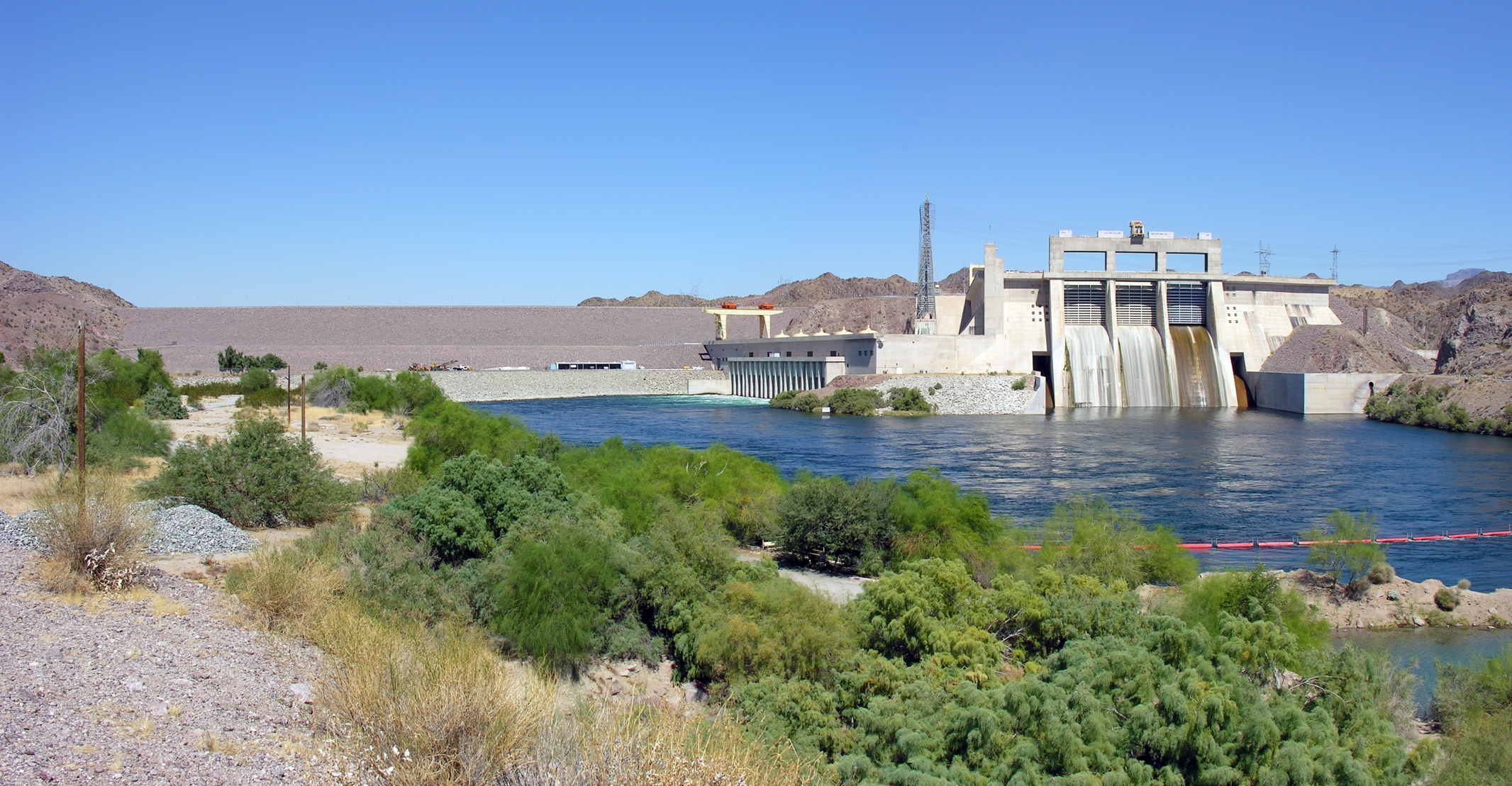
Davis Dam, September 2006

- 21 Mile Dam, Lucin
- Cave Creek Dam, Cave Creek Reservoir, Nevada Department of Conservation and Natural Resources
- Davis Dam, Lake Mohave, United States Bureau of Reclamation
- Derby Dam (diversion dam), USBR
- Echo Canyon Dam, Echo Canyon Reservoir, Nevada DCNR
- Hoover Dam, Lake Mead, USBR
- Lahontan Dam, Lahontan Reservoir, USBR
- Rye Patch Dam, Rye Patch Reservoir, USBR
- South Fork Dam, South Fork Reservoir, Nevada DCNR
- Lake Tahoe Dam, Lake Tahoe, USBR (on California / Nevada border)
- unnamed levee, Topaz Lake, Walker River Irrigation District (on California / Nevada border)
- Wild Horse Dam, Wild Horse Reservoir, Bureau of Indian Affairs
