= North Fork Humboldt River =

River in Nevada, United States

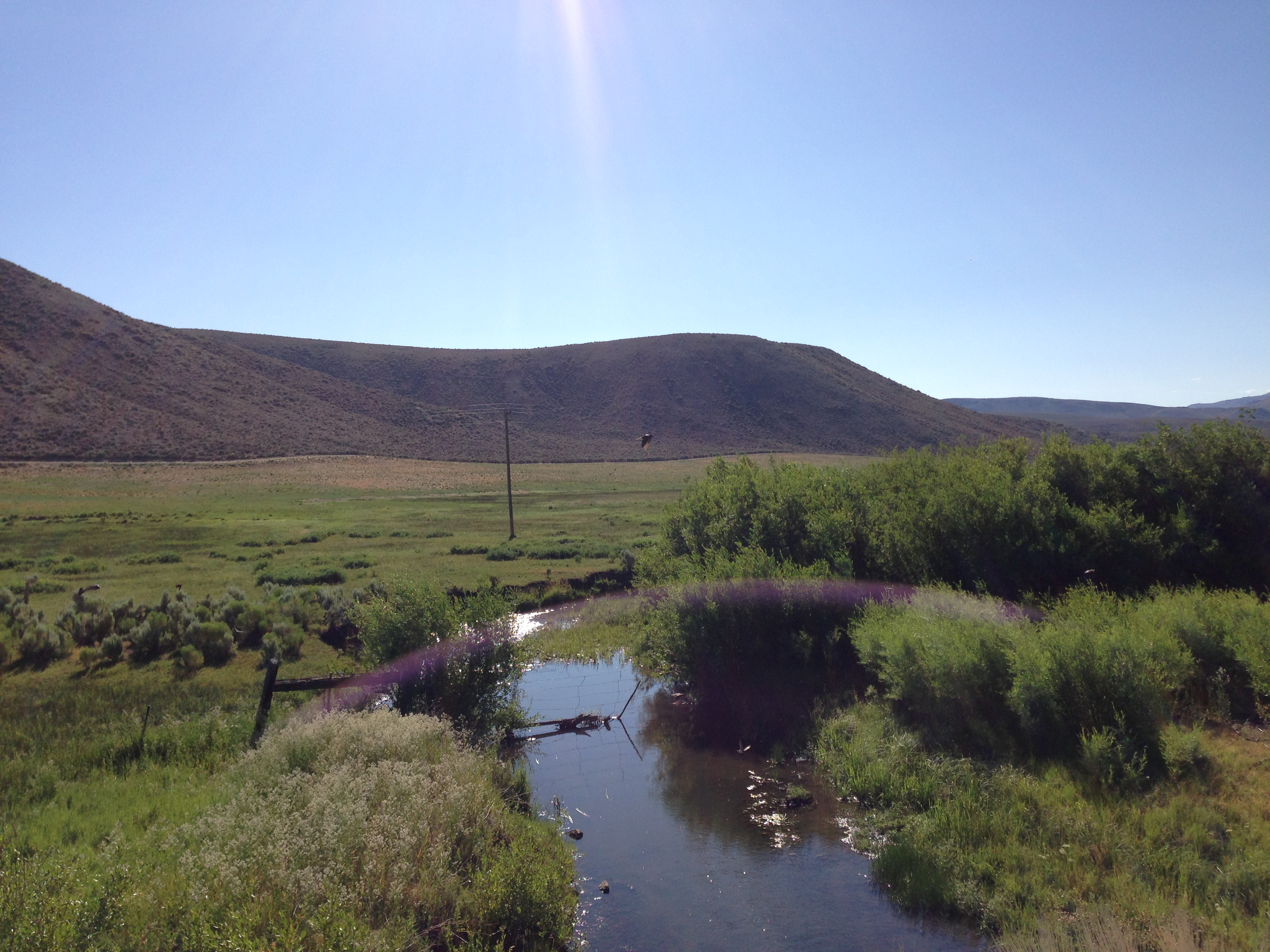
- View downstream along the North Fork Humboldt River from Nevada State Route 225

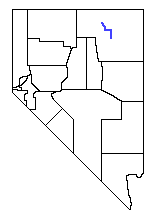
- Map of the North Fork Humboldt River
- Etymology: Alexander von Humboldt

Location
- Country: United States
- State: Nevada
- County: Elko County

Physical characteristics
- Source
  - location: Independence Mountains
  - coordinates: 41.551133°N 115.992092°W
  - elevation: 8,380 ft (2,550 m)
- Mouth: Humboldt River
  - coordinates: 40.924976°N 115.551003°W
  - elevation: 5,194 ft (1,583 m)

The North Fork of the Humboldt River is an approximately 70 miles (110 km) long tributary of the Humboldt River in northern Elko County, Nevada.

== Course ==
The river has its headwaters on the north slopes of McAfee Peak in the Independence Mountains of northeastern Nevada. It quickly exits the mountains and turns southward for approximately 25 miles (40 km), joining its waters with numerous other streams. Making a sharp bend to the east, it flows through a small gorge called Devil's Gap and then combines with Beaver Creek before resuming its southward course. The river, often with no more than a trickle of water left after its long journey through the dry hills of north-central Elko County, finally flows into the main branch of the Humboldt River about 15 miles (24 km) northeast of the city of Elko.

== History ==
The North Fork watershed is remote. Some mining activity in the area took place in about 1870, followed by cattle ranching and later sheep ranching in the 1890s. Problems of overgrazing and erosion in the Independence Mountains, which form the headwaters of the North Fork, prompted the federal government to establish the Independence Forest Reserve in 1906. This reserve has since been incorporated into the Mountain City Ranger District of the Humboldt-Toiyabe National Forest.

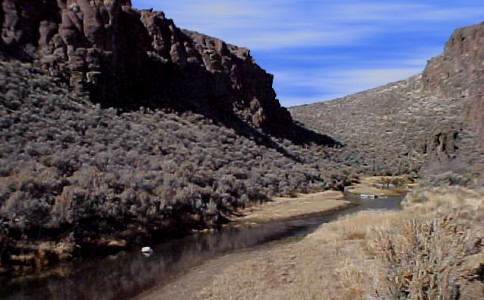
North Fork of the Humboldt River at Devil's Gap.
