= Maggie Creek =

Maggie Creek may refer to:

- Maggie Creek (South Fork Flathead River tributary), a stream in Montana
- Maggie Creek (Humboldt River tributary), a stream in Nevada
