= Susie Creek =

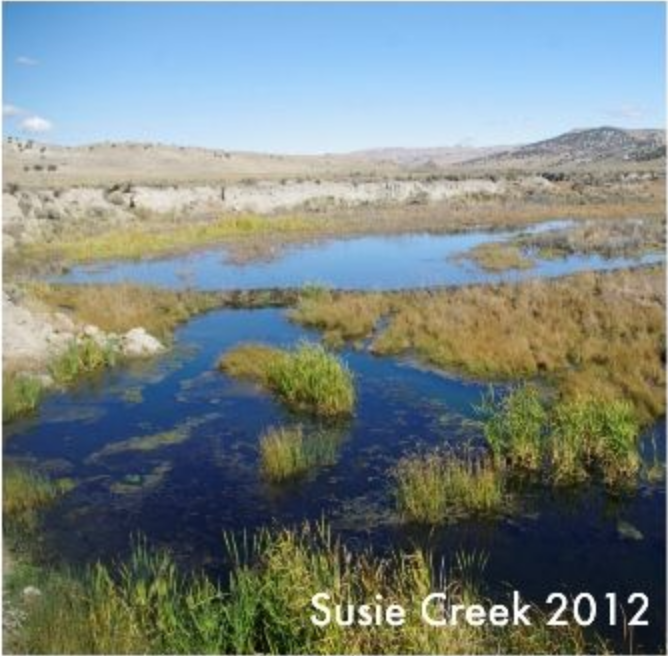
- Susie Creek after management of cattle grazing and return of beaver as shown in 2012 photo below. Courtesy Carol Evans, BLM.

Location
- Country: United States
- State: Nevada
- Region: Elko County
- City: Carlin, Nevada

Physical characteristics
- Source: The south flank of Lone Mountain
  - coordinates: 41°05′18″N 115°57′45″W
  - elevation: 6,984 ft (2,129 m)
- Mouth
  - coordinates: 40°43′09″N 116°04′29″W
  - elevation: 4,905 ft (1,495 m)

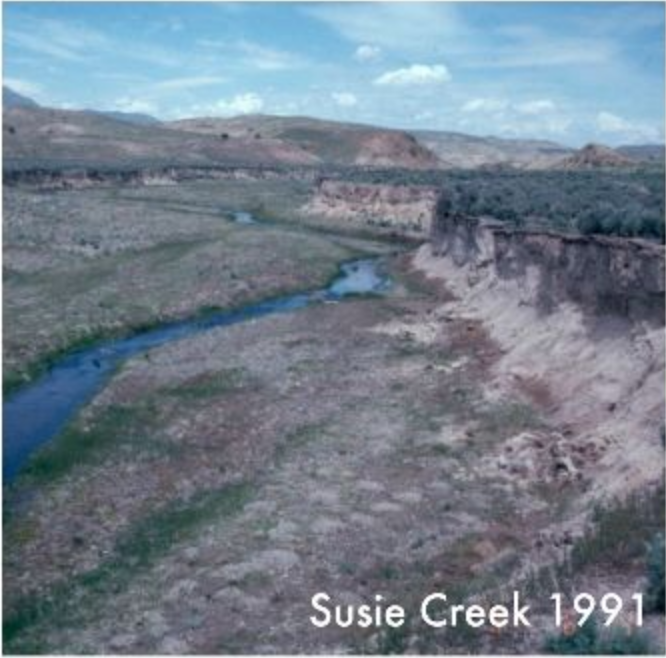
Susie Creek before restoration and rotation of cattle grazing. Courtesy Carol Evans, BLM.

Susie Creek is a southward flowing 35-mile-long (56 km) stream that begins on the south flank of Lone Mountain in the Independence Mountains and is a tributary to the Humboldt River at Carlin in Elko County in northeastern Nevada.

== History ==
A pioneer Scots family, on their overland trek to California in 1849, camped near the stream and named four creeks, including Susie Creek, Maggie Creek, Mary Creek, and Amelia Creek after their four daughters.

== Watershed ==
The Susie Creek watershed drains 180 square miles (470 km^{2}). The Susie Creek watershed is bounded by the Independence Mountains on the west and the Adobe Range to the north and east.

== Ecology ==
Maggie and Susie Creeks, which enter the Humboldt River near Carlin, have benefited from 20 years of work by ranchers, agencies, mines, and non-profit groups via improvements in grazing techniques and specific projects. These projects, which include installation of fish passable culverts, have led to the return of migrating Lahontan cutthroat trout (LCT, Onchorhynchus clarkii henshawi).

Projects led by Carol Evans, Nevada Bureau of Land Management fisheries biologist, have helped to restore North American beaver (Castor canadensis) to Susie Creek and other streams in Elko County by encouraging ranchers to allow beavers to dam the creek and to moderate riparian willow consumption by cattle with fencing and rotational grazing. Stream flows are more perennial, making more water available for wildlife and livestock and protecting populations of native trout. By working with satellite imagery and aerial photography, Trout Unlimited was able to compare conditions from as far back as 20 to 30 years ago to conditions in 2013. For the Susie Creek Basin as whole, riparian vegetation increased by over 100 acres, beaver dams increased from zero to 139, aerial extent of open water increased by over 20 acres and length of wetted stream increased by almost three miles.
