= Carson River Diversion Dam =

- U.S. National Register of Historic Places
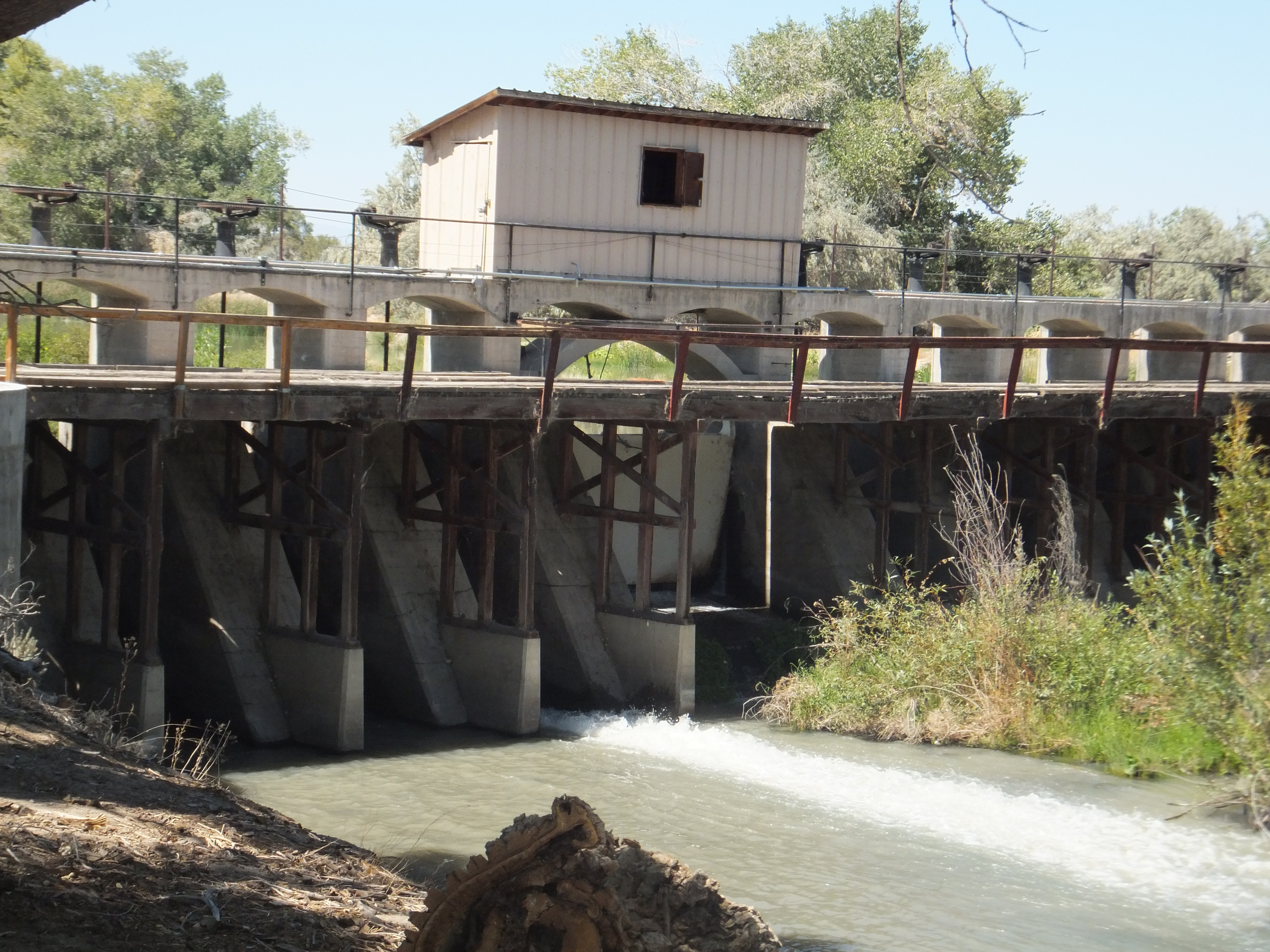

- Location within Nevada Location within the United States
- Nearest city: Fallon, Nevada
- Coordinates: 39°29′50″N 118°59′57″W
- Area: 1.4 acres (0.57 ha)
- Built: 1904
- Architectural style: Concrete Gate
- MPS: Newlands Reclamation TR
- NRHP reference No.: 81000380
- Added to NRHP: March 25, 1981

The Carson River Diversion Dam on the Carson River near Fallon, Nevada was built in 1904–05. It is a 21-foot (6.4 m) tall, 241-foot (73 m) long "concrete gate structure" with 21 "double leaf slide 5-by-10-foot (1.5 m × 3.0 m) spillway sections.

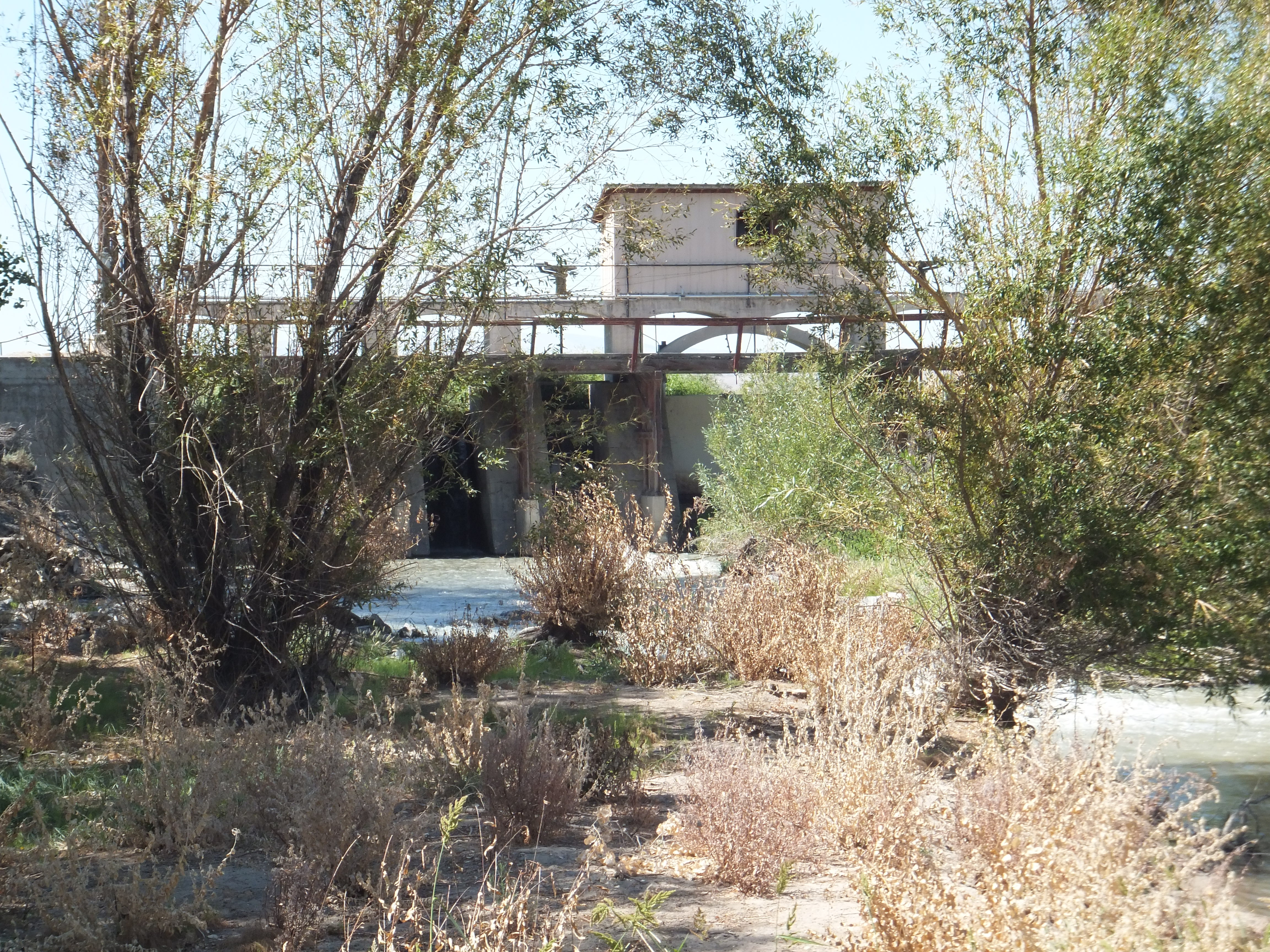

It diverts water for use in agricultural irrigation in hundreds of farms within the Newlands Projects area. It is located five miles northeast of the Lahontan Dam on the Carson River.

It was listed on the National Register of Historic Places in 1981.
