= Silver Springs, Nevada =

Silver Springs
- Census-designated place
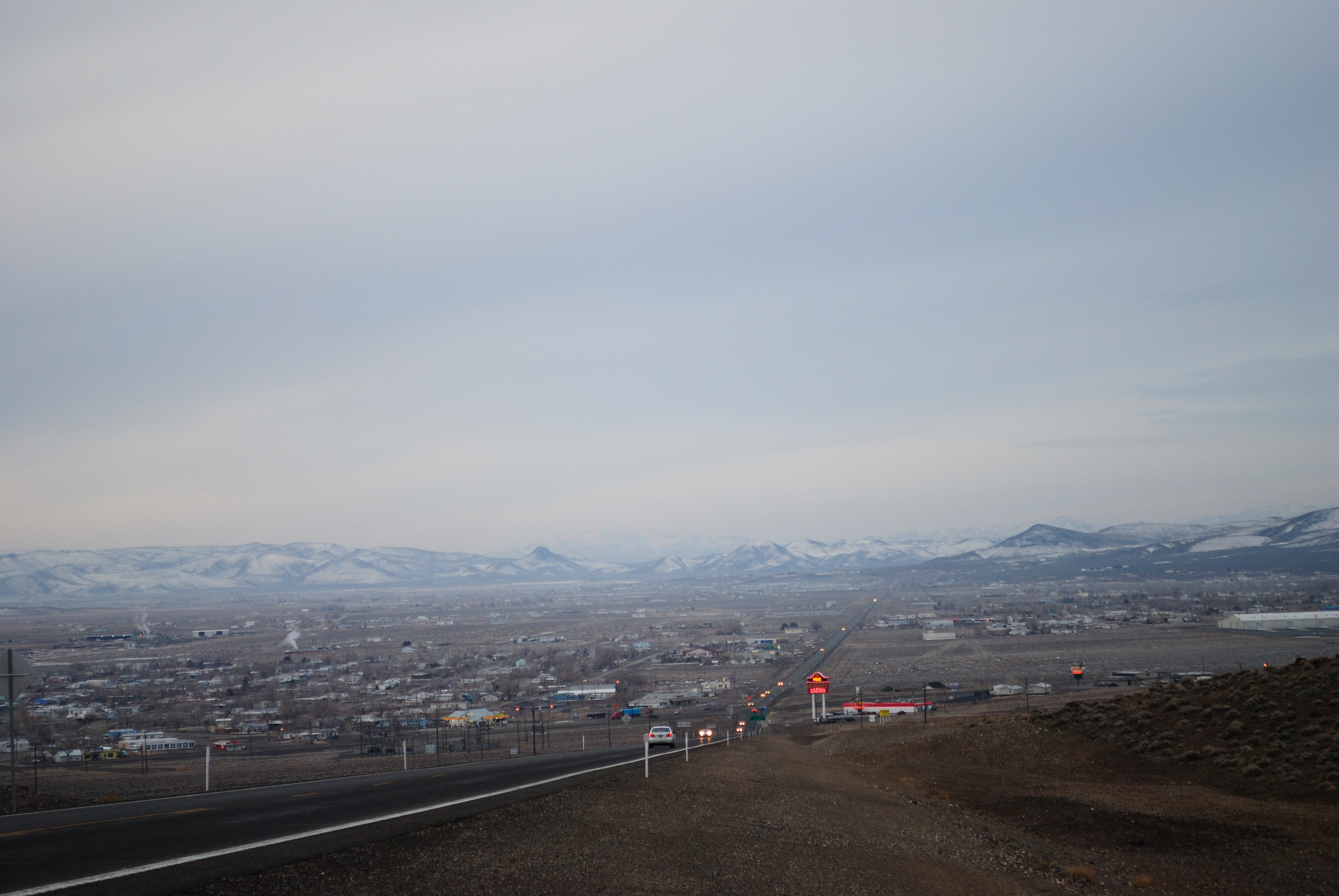
- Silver Springs, from US 95A

- Location of Silver Springs, Nevada
- Coordinates: 39°24′45″N 119°13′12″W
- Country: United States
- State: Nevada
- County: Lyon

Area
  - Total: 77.14 sq mi (199.78 km^{2})
  - Land: 71.63 sq mi (185.51 km^{2})
  - Water: 5.51 sq mi (14.27 km^{2})
- Elevation: 4,200 ft (1,300 m)

Population (2020)
  - Total: 5,629
  - Density: 78.6/sq mi (30.34/km^{2})
- Time zone: UTC-8 (PST)
  - Summer (DST): UTC-7 (PDT)
- ZIP code: 89429
- Area code: 775
- FIPS code: 32-67200
- GNIS feature ID: 0858187

Silver Springs is a census-designated place (CDP) in Lyon County, Nevada, US, at the intersection of US 50 (California Trail) and US 95A. As of the 2020 census, Silver Springs had a population of 5,629. Lahontan Reservoir, Lahontan State Recreation Area and historic Fort Churchill State Historic Park are all located nearby. The area is served by the Silver Springs Airport.

== History ==
Silver Springs was established by Merle Stanley Peek and Ben Klassen, two Los Angeles businessmen. Peek was one of several salesmen hired by Klassen; Peek encouraged Klassen to invest in land development in Nevada. Klassen and Peek started a partnership called the Silver Springs Land Company, establishing Silver Springs. In October 1949 the two men bought 1,800 acres and advertised the development in Los Angeles newspapers. In 1952, Klassen, who had come to greatly dislike Peek, sold his share of the company to Phillip Hess for $150,000 and retired.

== Geography ==
Silver Springs is located in northern Lyon County. U.S. Route 50 leads east 26 miles (42 km) to Fallon and west 36 miles (58 km) to Carson City, the state capital. US Route 95A leads north 15 miles (24 km) to Interstate 80 at Fernley and south 32 miles (51 km) to Yerington, the county seat.

According to the United States Census Bureau, the CDP has a total area of 77.1 square miles (199.7 km^{2}) of which 71.6 square miles (185.5 km^{2}) are land and 5.5 square miles (14.3 km^{2}), or 7.15%, are water. The Carson River forms the southern and eastern edges of the CDP; on the east side it is impounded to form Lahontan Reservoir. Lahontan State Recreation Area, on the shores of the reservoir, is within the CDP. Fort Churchill State Historic Park is just west of the CDP boundary, 9 miles (14 km) south of the US-50/US-95A junction.

== Demographics ==
Historical population
| Census | Pop. | Note | %± |
|---|---|---|---|
| 2020 | 5,629 | | — |
U.S. Decennial Census

=== 2020 census ===
As of the 2020 census, Silver Springs had a population of 5,629. The median age was 49.2 years. 19.6% of residents were under the age of 18 and 23.7% of residents were 65 years of age or older. For every 100 females there were 111.5 males, and for every 100 females age 18 and over there were 109.4 males age 18 and over.

0.0% of residents lived in urban areas, while 100.0% lived in rural areas.

There were 2,194 households in Silver Springs, of which 24.0% had children under the age of 18 living in them. Of all households, 44.7% were married-couple households, 25.0% were households with a male householder and no spouse or partner present, and 20.6% were households with a female householder and no spouse or partner present. About 26.4% of all households were made up of individuals and 13.4% had someone living alone who was 65 years of age or older.

There were 2,452 housing units, of which 10.5% were vacant. The homeowner vacancy rate was 4.3% and the rental vacancy rate was 6.0%.

Racial composition as of the 2020 census
| Race | Number | Percent |
|---|---|---|
| White | 4,574 | 81.3% |
| Black or African American | 37 | 0.7% |
| American Indian and Alaska Native | 96 | 1.7% |
| Asian | 51 | 0.9% |
| Native Hawaiian and Other Pacific Islander | 12 | 0.2% |
| Some other race | 232 | 4.1% |
| Two or more races | 627 | 11.1% |
| Hispanic or Latino (of any race) | 533 | 9.5% |

=== 2000 census ===
As of the census of 2000, there were 4,708 people, 1,766 households, and 1,227 families residing in the CDP. The population density was 65.0 inhabitants per square mile (25.1/km^{2}). There were 1,935 housing units at an average density of 26.7 per square mile (10.3/km^{2}). The racial makeup of the CDP was 91.67% White, 1.21% African American, 1.83% Native American, 0.45% Asian, 0.21% Pacific Islander, 1.47% from other races, and 3.16% from two or more races. Hispanic or Latino of any race were 4.63% of the population.

There were 1,766 households, out of which 28.7% had children under the age of 18 living with them, 55.3% were married couples living together, 8.9% had a female householder with no husband present, and 30.5% were non-families. 22.7% of all households were made up of individuals, and 9.5% had someone living alone who was 65 years of age or older. The average household size was 2.59 and the average family size was 3.02.

In the CDP, the population was spread out, with 25.0% under the age of 18, 5.5% from 18 to 24, 27.8% from 25 to 44, 27.4% from 45 to 64, and 14.1% who were 65 years of age or older. The median age was 40 years. For every 100 females, there were 96.7 males. For every 100 females age 18 and over, there were 95.5 males.

The median income for a household in the CDP was $34,427, and the median income for a family was $42,125. Males had a median income of $34,712 versus $23,750 for females. The per capita income for the CDP was $16,576. About 10.8% of families and 14.9% of the population were below the poverty line, including 21.9% of those under age 18 and 10.3% of those age 65 or over.
