= Maggie Creek (Humboldt River tributary) =

Maggie Creek Martins Fork of Humboldt River
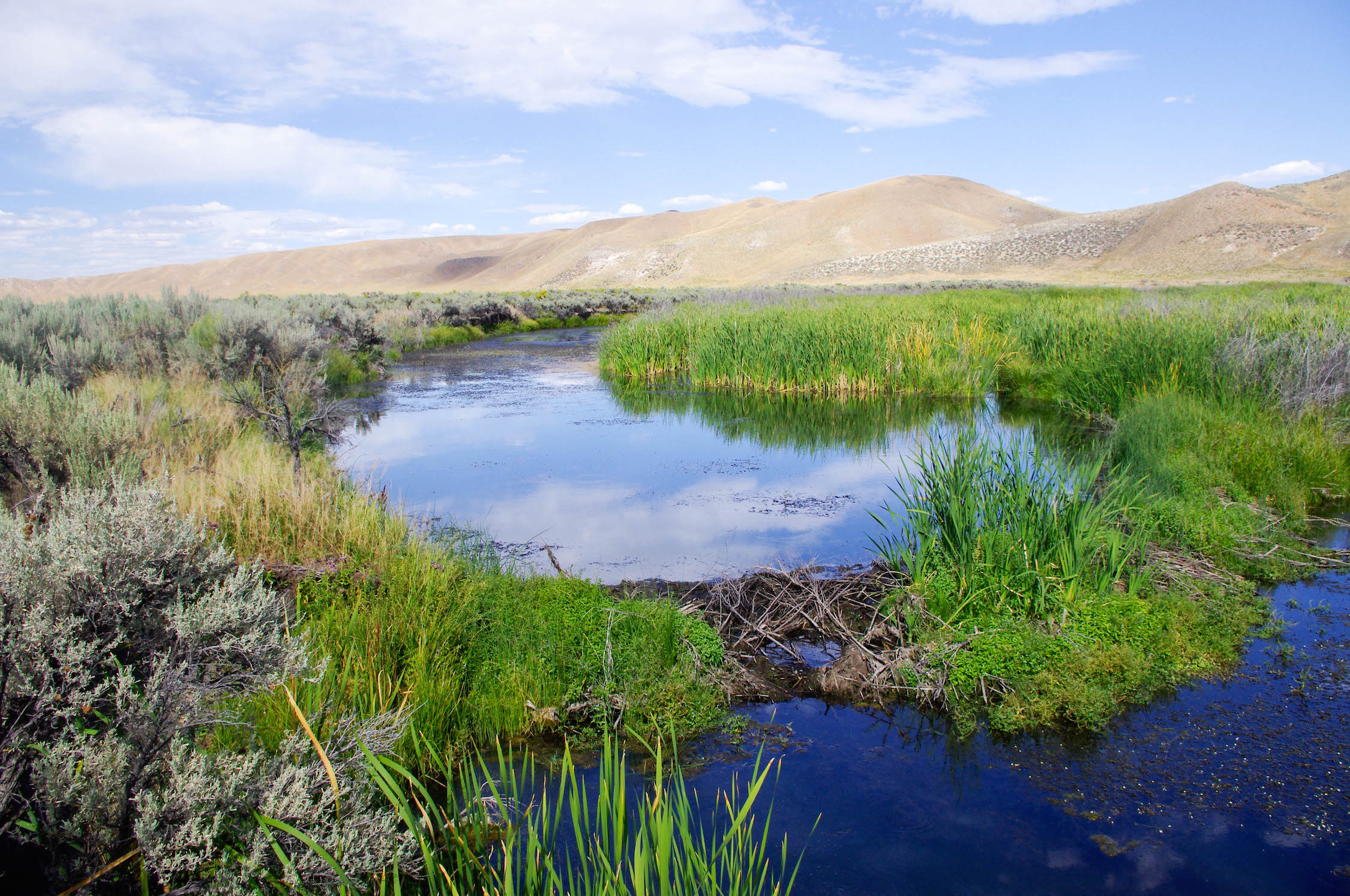
- Maggie Creek in 2011 reveals beaver dam and transformation from 1980 photo below. Courtesy Elko District, BLM.

Location
- Country: United States
- State: Nevada
- Region: Elko and Eureka Counties
- City: Carlin, Nevada

Physical characteristics
- Source: The north side of Independence Mountain
  - coordinates: 38°27′23″N 122°30′25″W
  - elevation: 6,760 ft (2,060 m)
- Mouth
  - coordinates: 41°11′44″N 116°00′26″W
  - elevation: 4,895 ft (1,492 m)

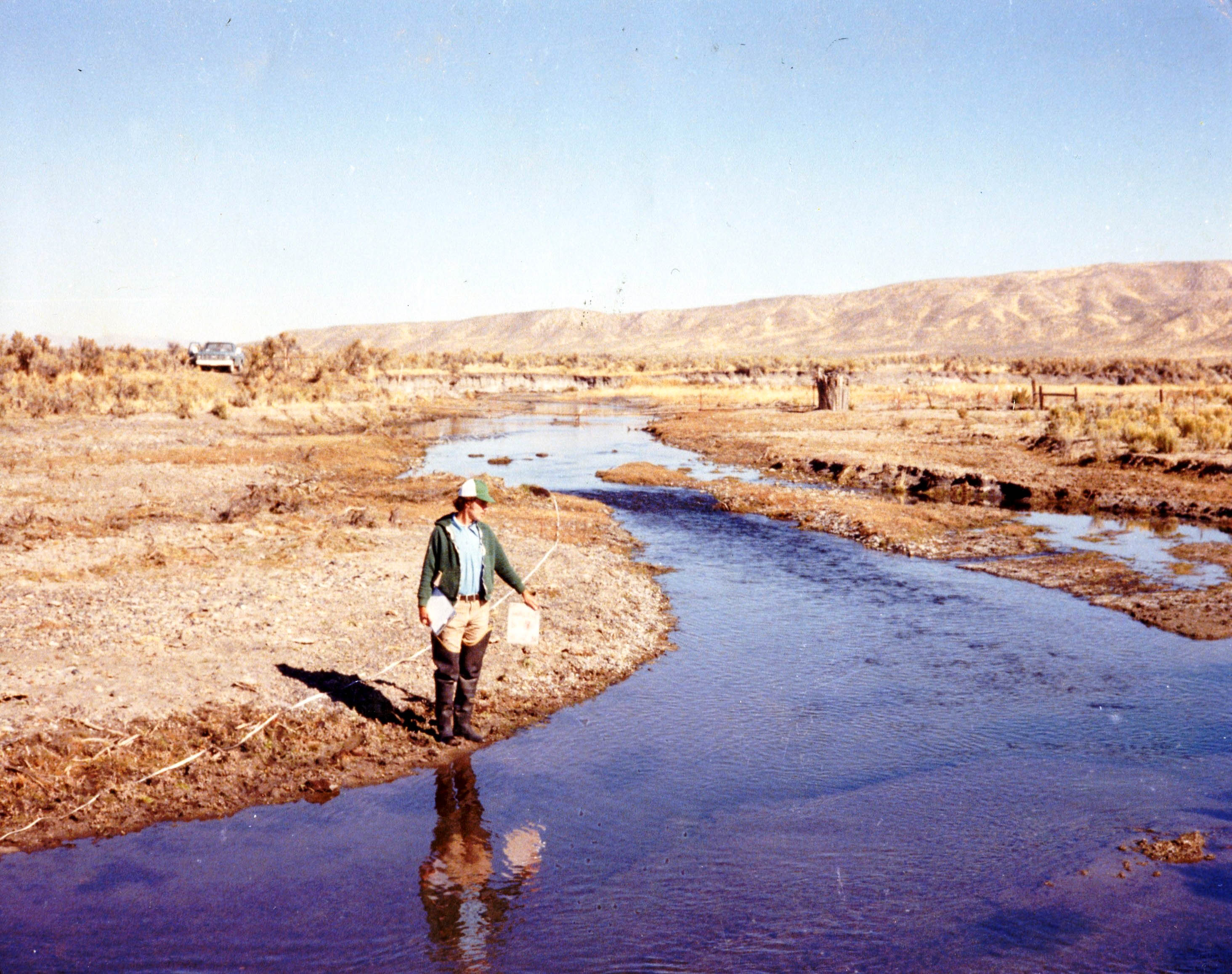
This 1980 image shows the denuded conditions that existed along Maggie Creek before grazing agreements were in place to manage cattle and before beaver returned to the area. Courtesy Elko District, BLM.

Maggie Creek is a southward flowing 85.4-mile-long (137.4 km) stream that begins in the Independence Mountains and is a tributary to the Humboldt River in Carlin in Elko County in northeastern Nevada.

== History ==
On early maps the stream was called Robin's Creek or 'Martin's Fork. A pioneer Scots family, on their overland trek to California in 1849, camped near the stream and named four creeks, including Maggie Creek, Susie Creek, Mary Creek, and Amelia Creek, after their four beautiful daughters.

== Watershed ==
The Maggie Creek watershed drains 400 square miles (1,000 km^{2}). The Maggie Creek watershed is bounded by the Tuscarora Mountains on the west and the Independence Mountains to the north and east. Tributaries from snowmelt in the Tuscarora Mountains supply most of the runoff for Maggie Creek, including Beaver Creek, Coyote Creek, Little Jack Creek, and Jack Creek.

== Geology ==
The Maggie Creek Watershed is underlain by the Carlin Trend, a 50 miles (80 km) long, 5-mile wide belt of faulted terrain that runs north from Carlin, Nevada. The Carlin Trend has been called the most prolific goldfield in the Western Hemisphere. Newmont Mining Corporation started open pit production on the Carlin Mine (within the lower portion of Maggie Creek Watershed) in 1965. With the discovery of higher grade gold at depth, underground mining began in 1994, necessitating mine water extraction and mitigation, the latter helping to fund the Maggie Creek Watershed Project.

== Ecology ==
Maggie and Susie Creeks, which enter the Humboldt River near Carlin, have benefited from 20 years of work by ranchers, agencies, mines, and non-profit groups via improvements in grazing techniques and specific projects. These projects, which include installation of fish passable culverts, have led to the return of migrating Lahontan cutthroat trout (LCT, Onchorhynchus clarkii henshawi). The most important change was application of prescriptive livestock grazing practices to limit hot season grazing. Prior to 1993, cattle were present on most riparian areas throughout the growing season. Maggie Creek was assumed historically to support an interconnected "metapopulation" of LCT where fish accessed tributary and mainstem habitats needed for growth, gene exchange, spawning migrations, and refuge from stressful conditions. Three tributaries contained road culverts at their confluence with Maggie Creek. The culverts at two of the primary tributaries, Little Jack and Coyote creeks, were thought to be partial barriers, whereas the structure at the largest tributary, Beaver Creek, was assumed to prevent all LCT movement. In 2005, the culverts were replaced and an irrigation diversion in the mainstem creek was modified with fish-friendly structures designed to allow fish passage, effectively reconnecting the three tributaries to the mainstem river corridor. To safeguard the entire system from nonnative fish invasion, a large instream barrier was installed in 2012 below the reconnected part of the watershed near the Humboldt River.

North American beaver (Castor canadensis) seem to have been making a comeback in Elko County possibly due to less fur trapping combined with reduced consumption of riparian willow and other vegetation by cattle. A remote sensing project found 107 beaver dams along 20 miles (32 km) of Maggie Creek in 2006, which rose to 271 dams in 2010. Beaver dams are accelerating recovery of riparian vegetation and widening the riparian zone as they slow the water and collect sediment that used to be lost downstream. In five years, beaver ponds have increased the amount of impounded water on Maggie Creek from 9 miles (14 km) of stream to 16 miles (26 km). The impounded water is seeping into the ground and raising the water table. Newmont's shallow groundwater monitoring wells along Maggie Creek have shown about a 2-foot (0.6 m) rise over the past 17 years along Maggie Creek. Stream flows are more perennial, making more water available for wildlife and livestock and protecting populations of native trout. Maggie Creek's Beaver Creek tributary flows from Beaver Peak in the Tuscarora Mountains.

== See also ==
- Humboldt River
- Susie Creek
