= Battle of Williams Station =

- Part of Pyramid Lake War
Date	29 May 1860
Location	on the Overland Road, 10 mi NE of the subsequent Fort Churchill 39.4111°N 119.1633°E
Result	U.S. victory

Belligerents
United States	Paiute

Commanders and leaders
John C. Hays	Numaga

Strength
>500 (Washoe Regiment)	150 warriors

Casualties and losses
2 killed	6 killed

The Battle of Williams Station was a minor skirmish during the Pyramid Lake War of 1860. The fight took place following the defeat of Major William Ormsby at the First Battle of Pyramid Lake as U.S. Volunteers entered the war.

== Battle ==
When Major William Ormsby's vigilante command was routed at Pyramid Lake, settlers in the area sent calls for help to California. John C. Hays responded to the call and arrived in Carson City to organize a volunteer regiment. Hays organized over 500 men from Carson City, Virginia City, Genoa and other communities into the "Washoe Regiment". U.S. Regular soldiers from Fort Alcatraz where en route to the region under Captain Joseph Stewart.

Instead of waiting for Stewart's regulars, Hays marched his command out of Carson City toward the location of the initial Indian attack at Williams Station. Hays encountered 150 Paiute warriors at the station and a brief skirmish ensued. Two soldiers and six Paiutes were killed. The warriors withdrew toward Pyramid Lake and were defeated in the Second Battle of Pyramid Lake.

== Williams Station ==
Williams Station was a Pony Express station kept by James O. Williams along the Carson River between stations 149 (in the Carson Sink) and 151 (Hooten Wells Station). The ruins were inundated by the Lahontan Reservoir created by the 1911 Lahontan Dam and were visible during a 1992 drought.
