= Wild Horse, Nevada =

Unincorporated community in Nevada, US

- Unincorporated community
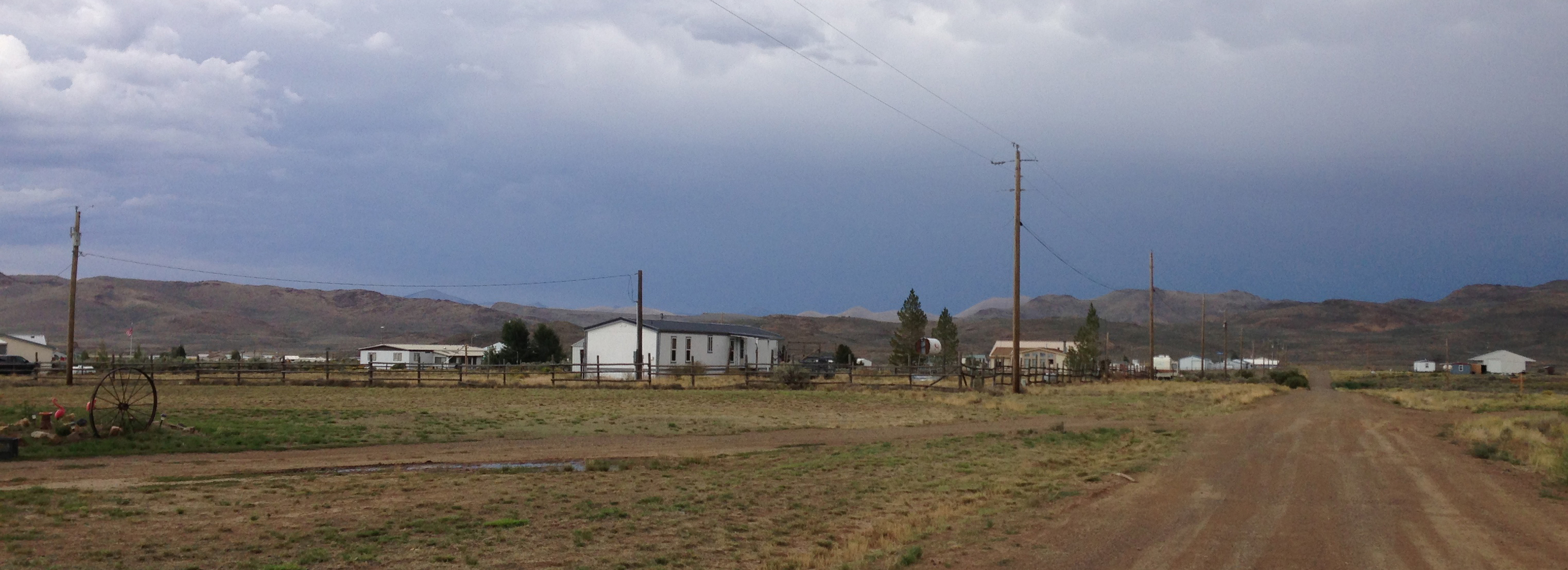

- Location in the state of Nevada
- Coordinates: 41°38′12.6204″N 115°48′13.8414″W
- Country: United States
- State: Nevada
- County: Elko
- Elevation: 6,207 ft (1,892 m)
- Time zone: UTC-8 (PST)
  - Summer (DST): UTC-7 (PDT)

Wild Horse is an unincorporated community in Elko County, Nevada, United States. It is located along Nevada State Route 225 just south of Wild Horse Reservoir, from which it derives its name.

== Climate ==
According to the Köppen Climate Classification system, Wild Horse has a warm-summer mediterranean continental climate, abbreviated "Dsb" on climate maps. The hottest temperature recorded in Wild Horse was 102 °F (38.9 °C) on July 23, 2003, while the coldest temperature recorded was −42 °F (−41.1 °C) on December 23, 1990 and February 3, 1996.

Climate data for Wild Horse Reservoir, Nevada, 1991–2020 normals, extremes 1982–present
Month	Jan	Feb	Mar	Apr	May	Jun	Jul	Aug	Sep	Oct	Nov	Dec	Year
Record high °F (°C)	58 (14)	61 (16)	70 (21)	80 (27)	89 (32)	96 (36)	102 (39)	98 (37)	98 (37)	86 (30)	71 (22)	60 (16)	102 (39)
Mean maximum °F (°C)	44.7 (7.1)	47.2 (8.4)	58.1 (14.5)	69.5 (20.8)	77.9 (25.5)	87.2 (30.7)	94.1 (34.5)	92.2 (33.4)	87.5 (30.8)	75.8 (24.3)	61.9 (16.6)	47.7 (8.7)	95.1 (35.1)
Mean daily maximum °F (°C)	32.7 (0.4)	36.0 (2.2)	44.3 (6.8)	52.0 (11.1)	62.2 (16.8)	73.2 (22.9)	84.6 (29.2)	83.4 (28.6)	73.6 (23.1)	59.5 (15.3)	44.5 (6.9)	34.0 (1.1)	56.7 (13.7)
Daily mean °F (°C)	18.8 (−7.3)	21.8 (−5.7)	30.7 (−0.7)	38.3 (3.5)	46.3 (7.9)	54.4 (12.4)	62.8 (17.1)	61.2 (16.2)	52.2 (11.2)	41.4 (5.2)	30.3 (−0.9)	20.3 (−6.5)	39.9 (4.4)
Mean daily minimum °F (°C)	4.9 (−15.1)	7.6 (−13.6)	17.0 (−8.3)	24.6 (−4.1)	30.4 (−0.9)	35.6 (2.0)	40.9 (4.9)	39.0 (3.9)	30.8 (−0.7)	23.3 (−4.8)	16.0 (−8.9)	6.6 (−14.1)	23.1 (−5.0)
Mean minimum °F (°C)	−21.1 (−29.5)	−18.4 (−28.0)	−5.3 (−20.7)	8.7 (−12.9)	16.6 (−8.6)	23.6 (−4.7)	28.8 (−1.8)	26.6 (−3.0)	16.7 (−8.5)	6.8 (−14.0)	−8.4 (−22.4)	−19.3 (−28.5)	−27.5 (−33.1)
Record low °F (°C)	−36 (−38)	−42 (−41)	−30 (−34)	−13 (−25)	7 (−14)	16 (−9)	17 (−8)	11 (−12)	5 (−15)	−10 (−23)	−32 (−36)	−42 (−41)	−42 (−41)
Average precipitation inches (mm)	1.69 (43)	1.00 (25)	1.20 (30)	1.42 (36)	1.60 (41)	0.78 (20)	0.52 (13)	0.42 (11)	0.56 (14)	0.83 (21)	1.13 (29)	1.69 (43)	12.84 (326)
Average snowfall inches (cm)	27.8 (71)	16.7 (42)	14.9 (38)	12.9 (33)	3.9 (9.9)	0.4 (1.0)	0.0 (0.0)	0.0 (0.0)	0.3 (0.76)	2.2 (5.6)	14.3 (36)	23.6 (60)	117.0 (297)
Average extreme snow depth inches (cm)	25.4 (65)	25.8 (66)	18.2 (46)	5.6 (14)	0.8 (2.0)	0.0 (0.0)	0.0 (0.0)	0.0 (0.0)	0.0 (0.0)	0.6 (1.5)	7.3 (19)	16.1 (41)	28.9 (73)
Average precipitation days (≥ 0.01 in)	11.9	9.7	10.2	11.0	10.4	6.0	4.2	3.6	4.5	5.6	8.5	10.8	96.4
Average snowy days (≥ 0.1 in)	9.7	7.5	6.7	5.4	1.9	0.1	0.0	0.0	0.3	1.2	5.5	8.9	47.0
Source 1: NOAA
Source 2: National Weather Service
