= Derby Dam =

Dam in Storey and Washoe counties in Nevada, United States

- Derby Diversion Dam
- U.S. National Register of Historic Places
- Nevada Historical Markers No. 43
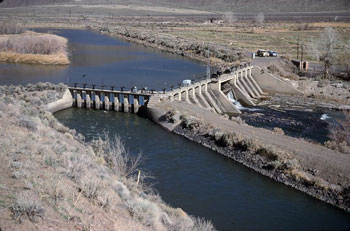
- Aerial view of the dam

- Location within Nevada Location within the United States
- Location: Storey / Washoe counties, Nevada
- Nearest city: Fernley, Nevada
- Coordinates: 39°35′9″N 119°26′49″W
- Built: 1903
- MPS: Newlands Reclamation TR (AD)
- NRHP reference No.: 78001727
- Markers No.: 43
- Added to NRHP: April 26, 1978

Derby Dam is a diversion dam built from 1903 to 1905 on the Truckee River, located about 20 miles (32 km) east of Reno in Storey and Washoe counties in Nevada, United States. It diverts water into the Truckee Canal that would otherwise enter Pyramid Lake. The canal feeds Lahontan Reservoir in the Carson River watershed, where it is used for irrigation.

It was the first project of the newly organized U.S. Reclamation Service (known today as the U.S. Bureau of Reclamation), organized by the Reclamation Act of 1902.

As a result of the diversion, Winnemucca Lake lost inflow and dried up, and Pyramid Lake lost more than 80 feet (24 m) in elevation, resulting in the near-extinction of the Lahontan cutthroat trout.

The dam is operated by the Truckee-Carson Irrigation District. It was named after the Derby Southern Pacific Railroad station.

== History ==
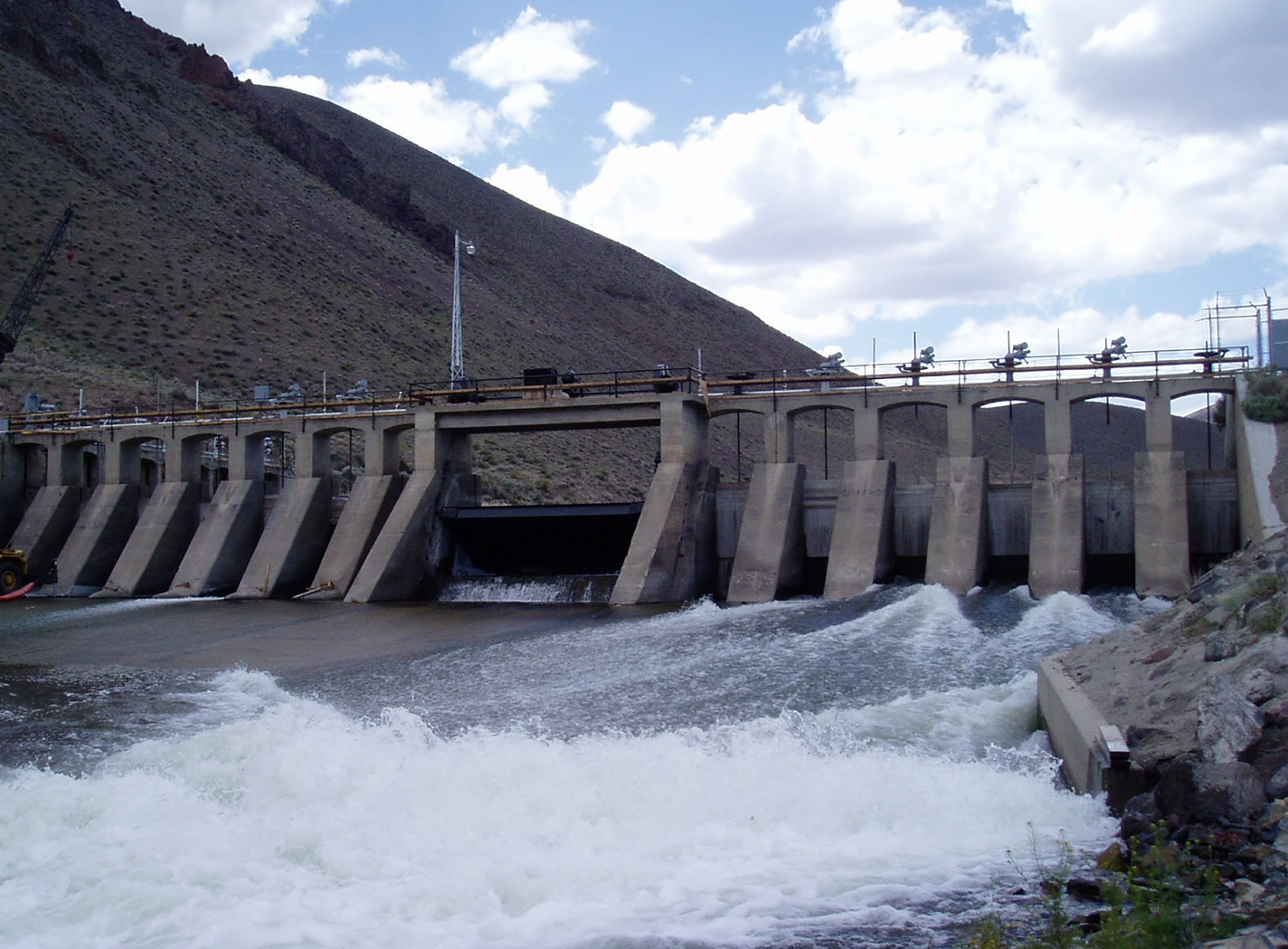
The Truckee River diversion dam built in 1903–04 diverts water that formerly ran unchecked into Winnemucca Lake and Pyramid Lake to the Lake Lahontan Reservoir, where it is used for irrigation.

The dam was constructed for the U.S. Bureau of Reclamation following an authorization for construction issued on March 14, 1903. Construction commenced on October 2, 1903, and was completed on May 20, 1905.

The project was authorized on March 14, 1903, by Secretary of the Interior Ethan A. Hitchcock. The dam is an original feature of the Newlands Reclamation Project, named after Nevada Congressman Francis Newlands, who sponsored the Reclamation Act. Not surprisingly, a dam in Newlands, Nevada launched the project. It was the first of five projects authorized and built under the Reclamation Act of 1902.

With passage of the act, the federal government assumed a major role in designing and constructing large-scale irrigation projects throughout the West. The diversion dam is part of the network of water storage, diversion, and conveyance structures that provides water for irrigating about 73,000 acres (30,000 ha) of farmland in an area that receives less than 4.5 inches (110 mm) of annual precipitation.

The dam is not designed for water storage. It is a low 31 feet (9.4 m) high concrete structure that diverts water from the Truckee River into the Truckee Canal and then two main project canals, the Southside Main Canal ("V" Line) and the Northside Main Canal ("T" Line). It was listed on the National Register of Historic Places in 1978 as the "Derby Diversion Dam."

== Environmental impact ==
Water diverted at Derby Dam to farms in Lahontan Valley constitutes as much as three-fourths of the flow of the Truckee River, the largest diversion of water from the Truckee River after it flows from Lake Tahoe.

The reduction in flow to Pyramid Lake and the inability of Lahontan cutthroat trout (the "salmon-trout" as described by Frémont) to bypass the dam for spawning eliminated them from Lake Lahontan and its tributaries and caused the near extinction of the species. But in 1979 a remnant population of the original Pyramid Lake cutthroat trout was discovered in a small brook on Pilot Peak, on the Nevada/Utah border. This population was used to successfully restock Lake Lahontan.

== See also ==
- List of dams and reservoirs in Nevada
- Winnemucca Lake
- Cui-ui
- DSSAM Model
