= Silver Springs Airport =

- IATA: none; ICAO: KSPZ; FAA LID: SPZ

Summary
- Airport type: Public
- Owner: Lyon County
- Operator: Silver Springs Airport, LLC
- Serves: Silver Springs, Nevada
- Elevation AMSL: 4,265.2 ft / 1,300 m
- Coordinates: 39°24′11″N 119°15′04″W
- Interactive map of Silver Springs Airport

Runways
Direction	Length		Surface
Direction	ft	m	Surface
6/24	6,001	1,828	Asphalt

Statistics (2022)
- Aircraft operations (year ending 3/31/2022): 12,660
- Based aircraft: 15
- Source: Federal Aviation Administration

Silver Springs Airport (ICAO: KSPZ, FAA LID: SPZ, formerly B08) is two miles southwest of Silver Springs, in Lyon County, Nevada. It is owned by Lyon County and leased to Silver Springs Airport, LLC.

Most U.S. airports use the same three-letter location identifier for the FAA and IATA, but this airport is SPZ to the FAA and has no IATA code (IATA assigned SPZ to Springdale Municipal Airport in Springdale, Arkansas).

== History ==
The airport was built by the United States Army Air Forces about 1942, and was known as Churchill Flight Strip. It was an emergency landing airfield for military training flights. It closed after World War II, and was turned over for local government use by the War Assets Administration.

== Facilities ==
Silver Springs Airport covers 400 acres (160 ha) at an elevation of 4,265.2 ft (1,300.0 m). Its single runway, 6/24, is 6,001 by 75 ft (1,829 by 23 m).

For the 12-month period ending March 31, 2022, the airport had 12,660 aircraft operations, an average of 35 per day: 85% general aviation and 14% military. 15 aircraft at that time were based at this airport, 14 single-engine and 1 military.

The airport started improvements in 2016, including jet fuel support.

== See also ==
- List of airports in Nevada
