= Independence Mountains =

Mountain range in Nevada, United States

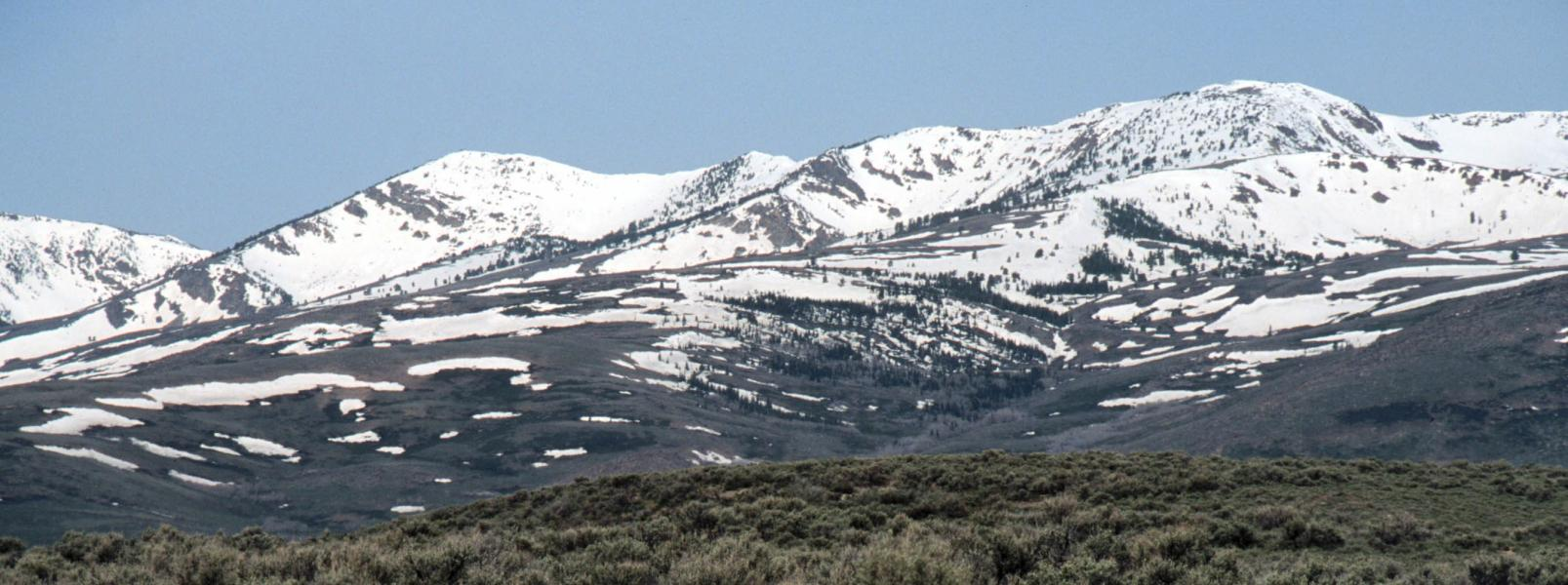

Highest point
- Peak: McAfee Peak
- Elevation: 10,438 ft (3,182 m)
- Coordinates: 41°31′18″N 115°58′25″W

Dimensions
- Length: 70 mi (110 km) North-South

Geography
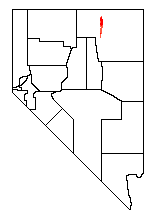
- Location of the Independence Mountains within Nevada
- Country: United States
- State: Nevada
- Range coordinates: 41°31′N 115°58′W

The Independence Mountains are a mountain range in northern Elko County, Nevada, United States. They are called Settoya in Shoshoni. The range reaches a maximum elevation of 10,439 ft (3,182 m) on the summit of McAfee Peak. The range extends northward approximately 70 mi (110 km) from a point near Carlin to the banks of the Owyhee River. To the east is the North Fork of the Humboldt River, and to the west is the Owyhee Desert. Passing to the south is the main branch of the Humboldt River, and near the northern end of the range is the Wild Horse State Recreation Area. The Owyhee River is a tributary to the Snake-Columbia system, while the Humboldt is within the Great Basin.

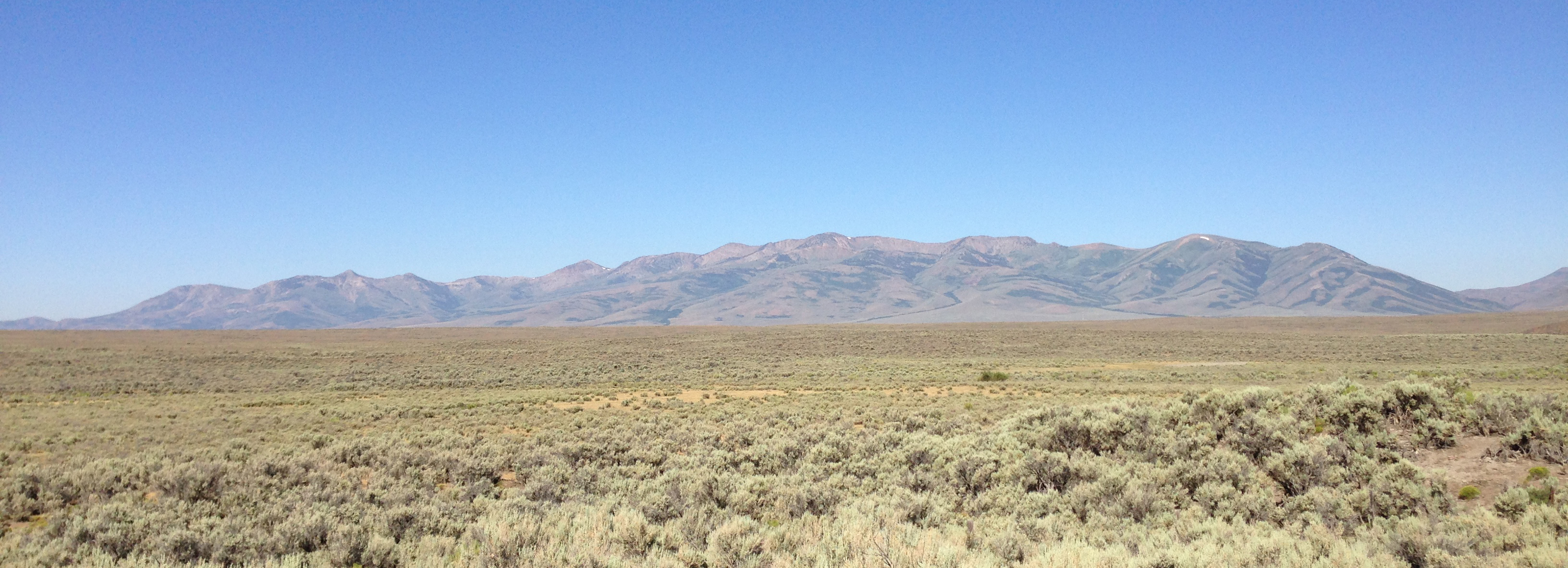
Central core of the Independence Mountains, Nevada viewed from Charleston Road

From a point about seven miles north of Carlin, the range rises to Swales Mountain, at an elevation of 8,068 ft (2,459 m). Dropping to an area of hills and buttes, it then rises again to Lone Mountain (Nannies Peak), at 8,780 ft (2,680 m). The range then drops nearly to the level of the surrounding valleys, at a pass where State Route 226 connects to the community of Tuscarora.

Rising sharply to the main core of the range, the crest runs through Wheeler Mountain (9,057 ft (2,761 m)), Jack's Peak (10,198 ft (3,108 m)), and finally to the range high point, McAfee Peak.

Most of the range north of State Route 226 is included within the Mountain City Ranger District of the Humboldt-Toiyabe National Forest.

== Climate ==
Taylor Canyon is a SNOTEL weather station situated at the southern base of Wheeler Mountain (Nevada), along the State Route 226 pass.

Climate data for Taylor Canyon, Nevada, 1991–2020 normals, 1989-2020 extremes: 6200ft (1890m)
Month	Jan	Feb	Mar	Apr	May	Jun	Jul	Aug	Sep	Oct	Nov	Dec	Year
Record high °F (°C)	60 (16)	67 (19)	74 (23)	77 (25)	87 (31)	94 (34)	99 (37)	95 (35)	92 (33)	84 (29)	68 (20)	58 (14)	99 (37)
Mean maximum °F (°C)	51 (11)	57 (14)	61 (16)	68 (20)	76 (24)	85 (29)	92 (33)	90 (32)	85 (29)	74 (23)	61 (16)	51 (11)	93 (34)
Mean daily maximum °F (°C)	36.6 (2.6)	39.3 (4.1)	46.0 (7.8)	50.9 (10.5)	60.6 (15.9)	71.1 (21.7)	82.9 (28.3)	81.6 (27.6)	71.8 (22.1)	57.9 (14.4)	44.4 (6.9)	35.7 (2.1)	56.6 (13.7)
Daily mean °F (°C)	23.5 (−4.7)	25.8 (−3.4)	32.6 (0.3)	38.1 (3.4)	45.6 (7.6)	53.1 (11.7)	62.5 (16.9)	61.1 (16.2)	52.7 (11.5)	41.1 (5.1)	30.7 (−0.7)	22.9 (−5.1)	40.8 (4.9)
Mean daily minimum °F (°C)	10.3 (−12.1)	12.3 (−10.9)	19.1 (−7.2)	25.1 (−3.8)	30.5 (−0.8)	35.1 (1.7)	42.0 (5.6)	40.4 (4.7)	33.4 (0.8)	24.2 (−4.3)	17.0 (−8.3)	10.1 (−12.2)	25.0 (−3.9)
Mean minimum °F (°C)	−12 (−24)	−9 (−23)	1 (−17)	11 (−12)	17 (−8)	23 (−5)	31 (−1)	29 (−2)	20 (−7)	8 (−13)	−5 (−21)	−13 (−25)	−18 (−28)
Record low °F (°C)	−29 (−34)	−20 (−29)	−12 (−24)	−1 (−18)	9 (−13)	17 (−8)	24 (−4)	17 (−8)	10 (−12)	−10 (−23)	−23 (−31)	−36 (−38)	−36 (−38)
Average precipitation inches (mm)	1.48 (38)	1.02 (26)	1.14 (29)	1.48 (38)	1.48 (38)	0.67 (17)	0.33 (8.4)	0.35 (8.9)	0.80 (20)	1.07 (27)	1.46 (37)	1.83 (46)	13.11 (333.3)
Source 1: XMACIS2
Source 2: NOAA (Precipitation)

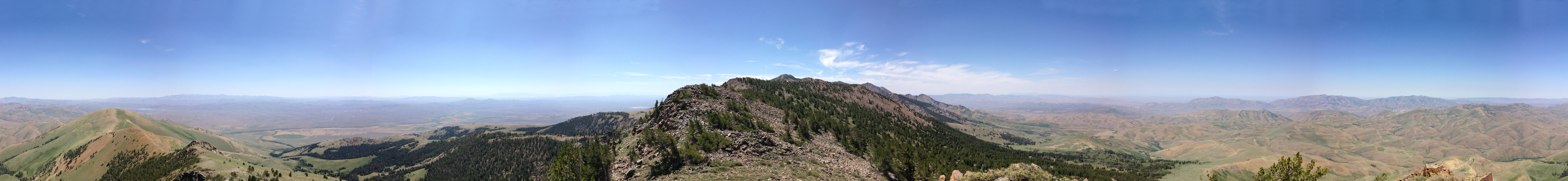
View from the main Independence Mountain ridge north of McAfee Peak
