= Wild Horse State Recreation Area =

Public recreation area in Nevada, US

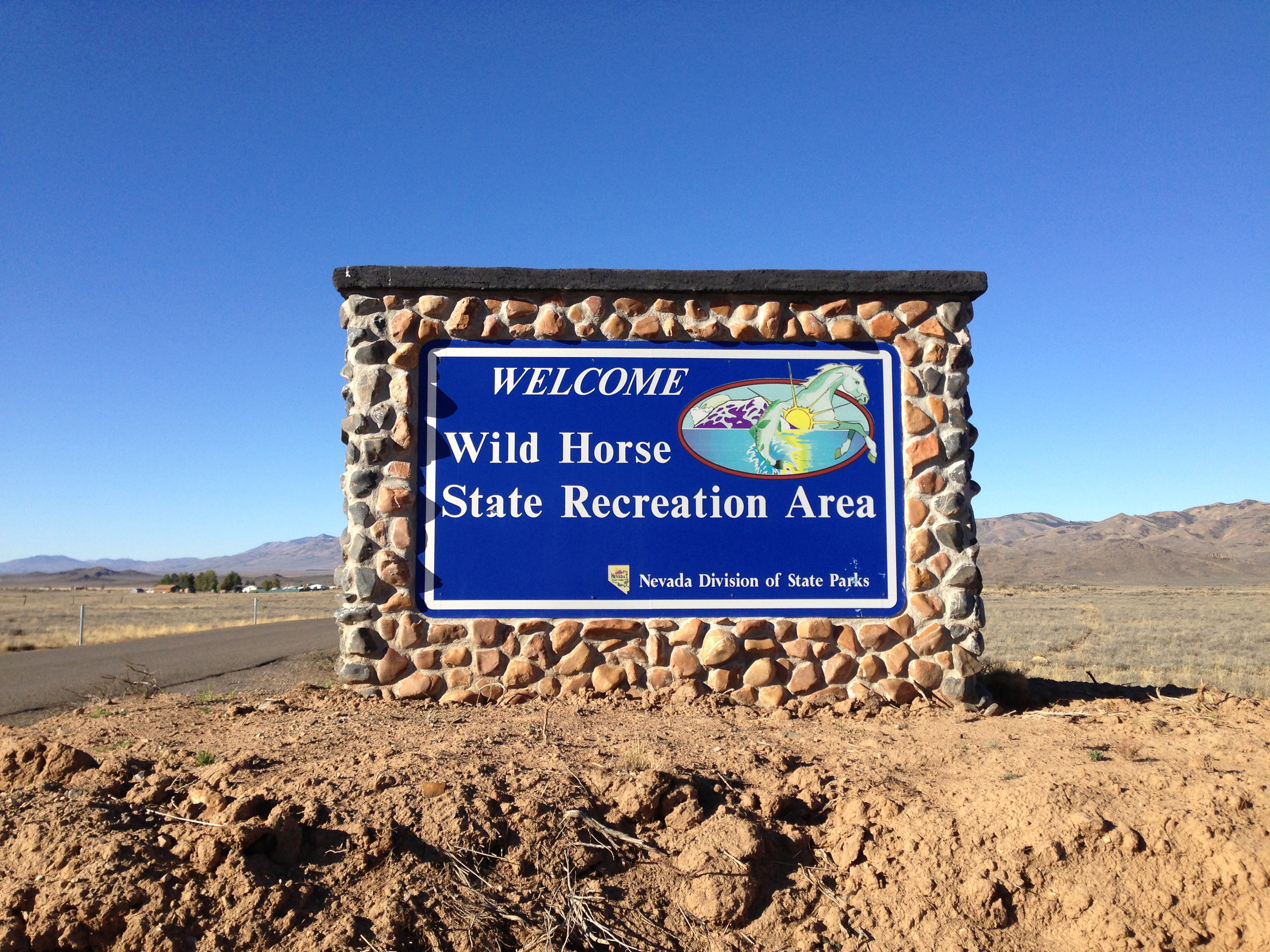

- Location within Nevada
- Location: Elko County, Nevada, United States
- Nearest city: Elko, Nevada
- Coordinates: 41°40′15″N 115°47′59″W
- Area: 119.58 acres (48.39 ha)
- Elevation: 6,208 ft (1,892 m)
- Established: 1979
- Administrator: Nevada Division of State Parks
- Visitors: 2,303 vehicles (in 2017)
- Designation: Nevada state park
- Website: Official website

Wild Horse State Recreation Area is a public recreation area located on the northeast shore of Wild Horse Reservoir, approximately 67 miles (108 km) north of Elko, Nevada. The 120-acre (49 ha) park is a popular destination for fishing, and especially ice fishing, on the reservoir, which was created in 1937 and enlarged to cover 2,830 acres (1,150 ha) with the creation of a new dam in 1969. In addition to year-round fishing, the park offers opportunities for camping, picnicking, boating, ice skating, sledding, snowmobiling, and skiing.
