= Truckee–Carson Irrigation District =

TCID may also stand for "Tissue Culture Infectious Dose." or "4,5,6,7-Tetrachloro-1H-indene-1,3(2H)-dione"

The Truckee–Carson Irrigation District (TCID) is a public enterprise organized in the State of Nevada, which operates dams at Lake Tahoe, diversion dams on the Truckee River in Washoe County, and the Lahontan Reservoir.

TCD also operates 380 miles (610 km) of canals, and 340 miles (550 km) of drains, in support of agriculture in Lyon County and Churchill County, western Nevada. The excess irrigation water eventually drains into the endorheic Lake Lahontan Basin.

== Endangered species ==
Diversion of water by the TCID from the Truckee River has caused a reduction in the level of natural Pyramid Lake, resulting in the endemic species of fish that live in it becoming endangered species.

In the mid-1980s the United States Environmental Protection Agency initiated development of the DSSAM Model to analyze effects of variable Truckee River flow rates and water quality upon these endangered fish species.

== See also ==
- Derby Dam
- Newlands Reclamation Act
