= McAfee Peak =

Mountain in Elko County, Nevada, U.S.

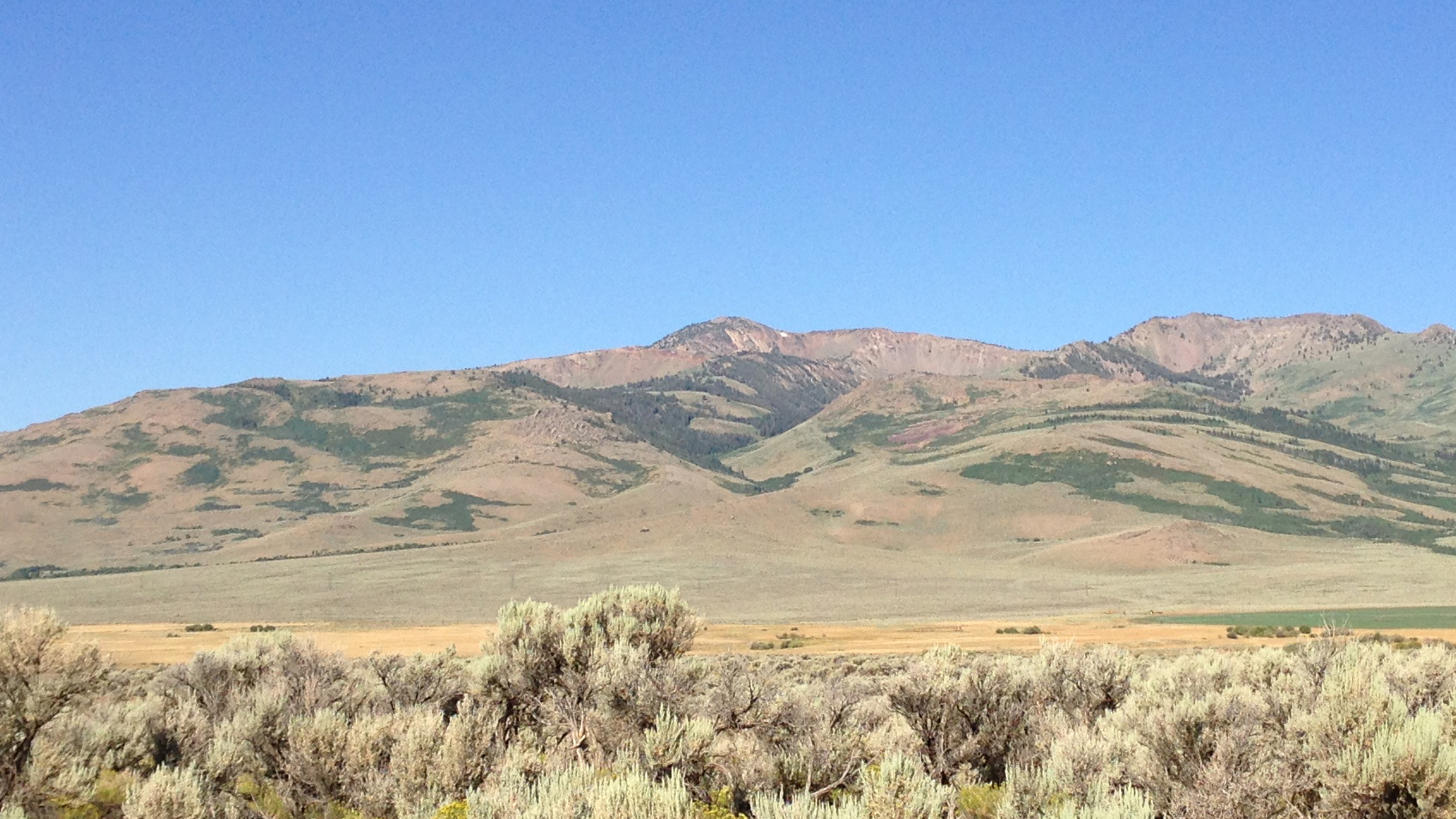
- View of McAfee Peak from North Fork Road

Highest point
- Elevation: 10,442 ft (3,183 m) NAVD 88
- Prominence: 4,158 ft (1,267 m)
- Coordinates: 41°31′18″N 115°58′24″W

Geography
- Location within Nevada
- Location: Elko County, Nevada, U.S.
- Parent range: Independence Mountains
- Topo map: USGS McAfee Peak

Climbing
- Easiest route: From Jacks Creek Summit, Class 2 scramble south along the ridgeline

McAfee Peak is the highest mountain in the Independence Mountains of northern Elko County, Nevada, United States. It ranks twenty-first among the most topographically prominent peaks in the state. The peak is located within the Mountain City Ranger District of the Humboldt-Toiyabe National Forest.

== Summit panorama ==
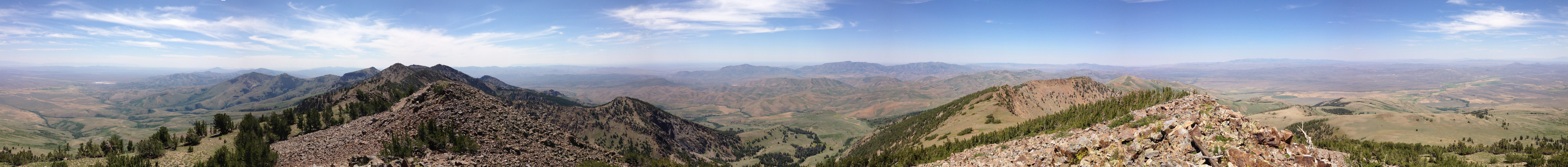
360-degree panorama from the summit of McAfee Peak
