= Wild Horse Reservoir =

Reservoir in Elko County, Nevada, US

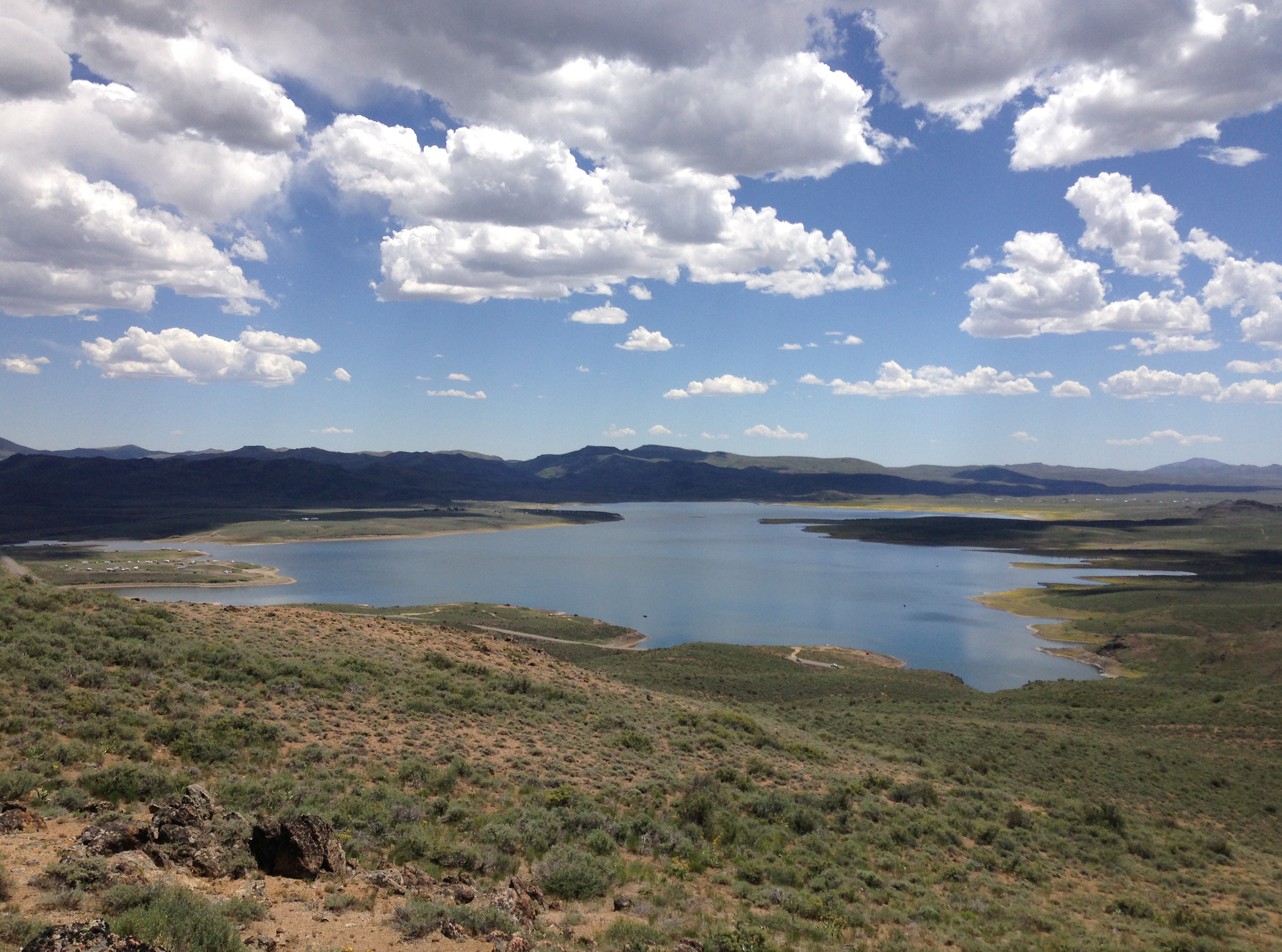
- Wild Horse Reservoir viewed from northwest

- Location of Wild Horse Reservoir in Nevada
- Location: Elko County, Nevada
- Coordinates: 41°40′0.32″N 115°48′24.99″W
- Type: Reservoir
- Primary inflows: Owyhee River, Hot Creek, Penrod Creek, Warm Creek, Poorman Creek
- Primary outflows: Owyhee River
- Basin countries: United States
- Surface area: 2,830 acres (11.5 km^{2})
- Average depth: 40 feet (12 m)
- Max. depth: 70 feet (21 m)
- Water volume: 71,500 acre-feet (88,200,000 m^{3})
- Surface elevation: 6,208 feet (1,892 m)

Wild Horse Reservoir is a man-made lake in Elko County, Nevada, in the United States. The reservoir was initially created in 1937 by the construction of Wild Horse Dam. In 1969, a new concrete single-angle arch dam was constructed by the United States Bureau of Reclamation for the Bureau of Indian Affairs with a height of 87 feet (27 m) and a length of 458 feet (140 m) at its crest. The original 1937 dam was left in place and is still partly visible. The newer dam doubled the size of the reservoir.

The reservoir impounds the Owyhee River for flood control and irrigation storage, part of the larger Duck Valley Irrigation Project. The dam and reservoir are owned and administered by the BIA, and leased to the nearby Duck Valley Indian Reservation (Sho-Pai). Recreation on the lake includes fishing for trout, bass, catfish and perch. The state of Nevada also maintains the adjacent Wild Horse State Recreation Area.

The small community of Wild Horse is located on the south shore.

== Gallery ==
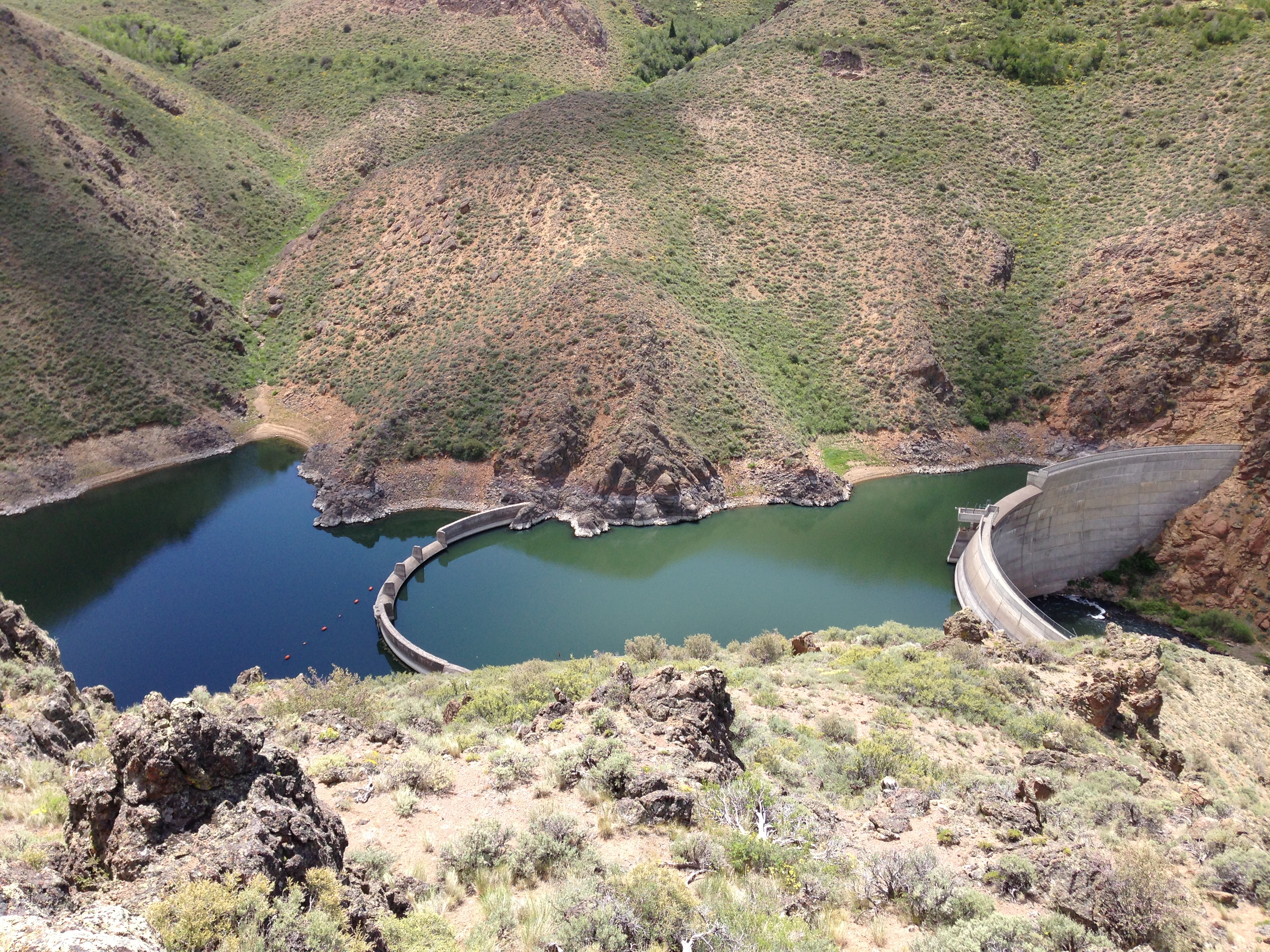
Double dams of Wild Horse Reservoir

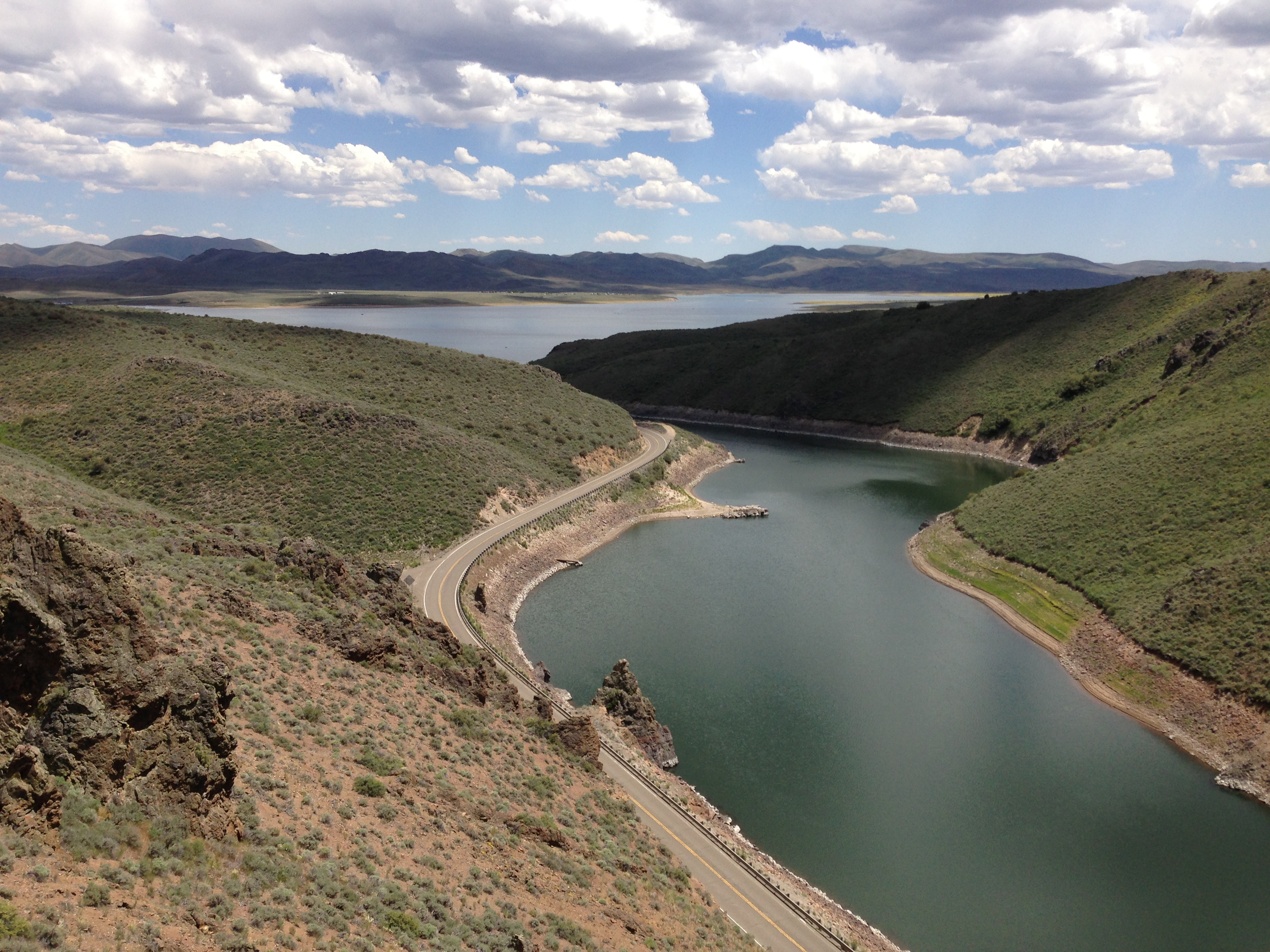
Wild Horse Reservoir viewed from rock outcrop above dam

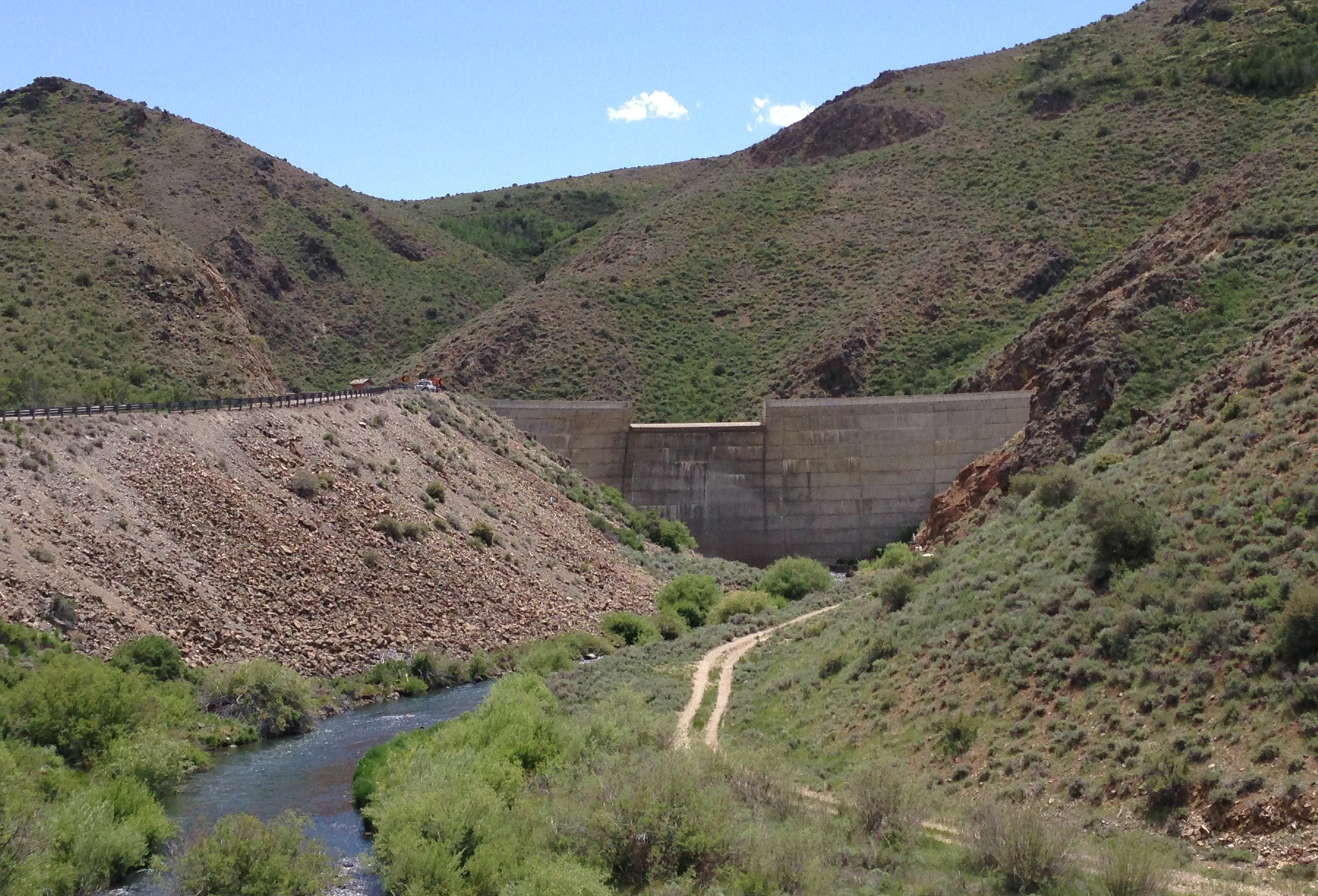
Wild Horse Dam viewed from downstream

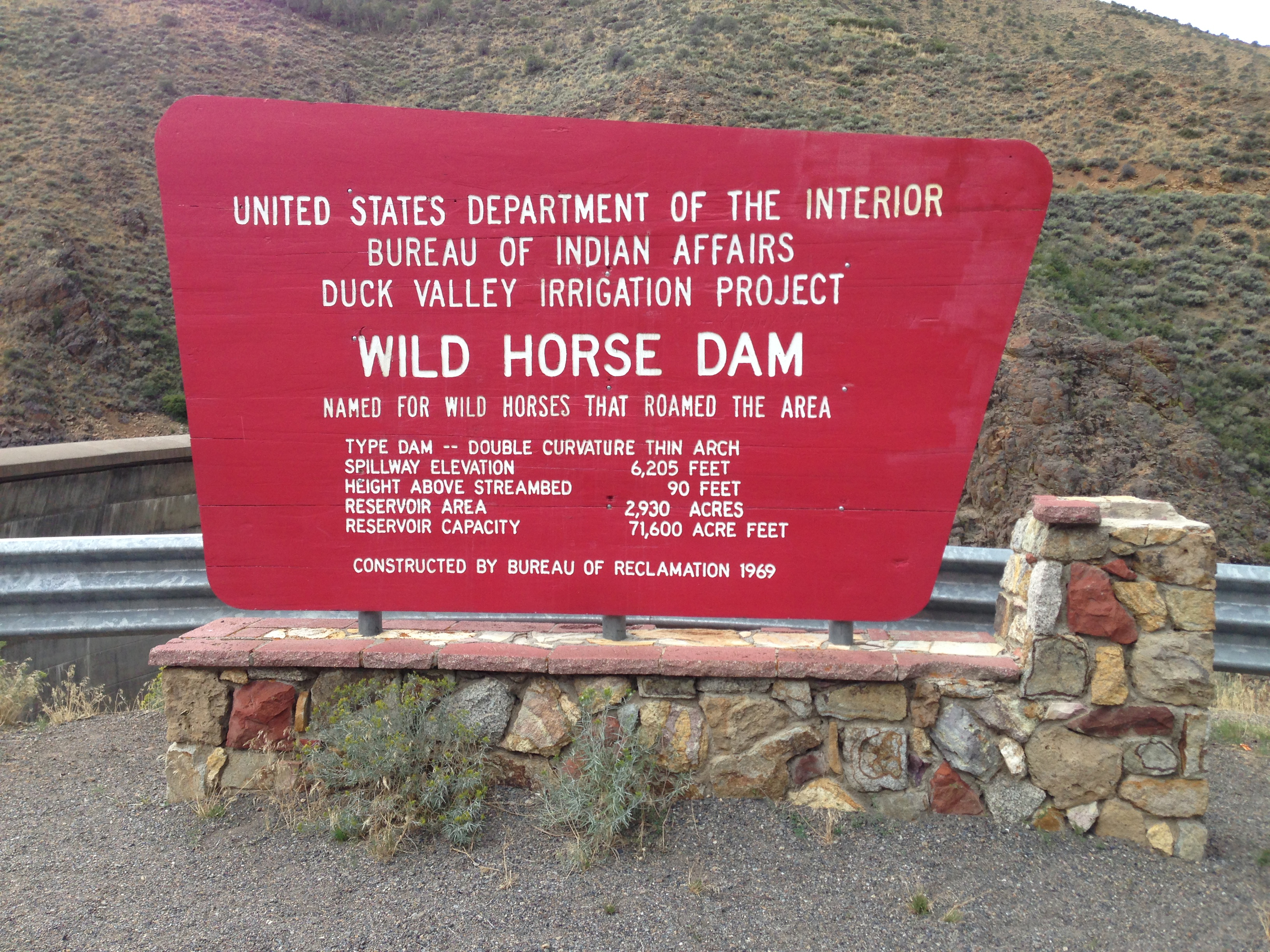
Sign describing Wild Horse Dam

Wild Horse Reservoir, Nevada, as seen from above

== Climate ==
Wild Horse Reservoir has a humid continental climate (Dfb) bordering on a subalpine climate (Dfc). Summers are warm to hot with brisk nights, and tend to be drier than other times of the year. Winters are very chilly with heavy snowfall and nights near zero.

Climate data for Wild Horse Reservoir, Nevada, 1991–2020 normals, extremes 1982–present
| Month | Jan | Feb | Mar | Apr | May | Jun | Jul | Aug | Sep | Oct | Nov | Dec | Year |
|---|---|---|---|---|---|---|---|---|---|---|---|---|---|
| Record high °F (°C) | 58 (14) | 61 (16) | 70 (21) | 80 (27) | 89 (32) | 96 (36) | 102 (39) | 98 (37) | 98 (37) | 86 (30) | 71 (22) | 60 (16) | 102 (39) |
| Mean maximum °F (°C) | 44.7 (7.1) | 47.2 (8.4) | 58.1 (14.5) | 69.5 (20.8) | 77.9 (25.5) | 87.2 (30.7) | 94.1 (34.5) | 92.2 (33.4) | 87.5 (30.8) | 75.8 (24.3) | 61.9 (16.6) | 47.7 (8.7) | 95.0 (35.0) |
| Mean daily maximum °F (°C) | 32.7 (0.4) | 36.0 (2.2) | 44.3 (6.8) | 52.0 (11.1) | 62.2 (16.8) | 73.2 (22.9) | 84.6 (29.2) | 83.4 (28.6) | 73.6 (23.1) | 59.5 (15.3) | 44.6 (7.0) | 34.0 (1.1) | 56.7 (13.7) |
| Daily mean °F (°C) | 18.8 (−7.3) | 21.8 (−5.7) | 30.7 (−0.7) | 38.3 (3.5) | 46.3 (7.9) | 54.4 (12.4) | 62.8 (17.1) | 61.2 (16.2) | 52.2 (11.2) | 41.4 (5.2) | 30.3 (−0.9) | 20.3 (−6.5) | 39.9 (4.4) |
| Mean daily minimum °F (°C) | 4.9 (−15.1) | 7.6 (−13.6) | 17.0 (−8.3) | 24.6 (−4.1) | 30.4 (−0.9) | 35.6 (2.0) | 40.9 (4.9) | 39.0 (3.9) | 30.8 (−0.7) | 23.3 (−4.8) | 16.0 (−8.9) | 6.6 (−14.1) | 23.1 (−5.0) |
| Mean minimum °F (°C) | −21.1 (−29.5) | −18.4 (−28.0) | −5.3 (−20.7) | 8.7 (−12.9) | 16.6 (−8.6) | 23.6 (−4.7) | 28.8 (−1.8) | 26.6 (−3.0) | 16.7 (−8.5) | 6.8 (−14.0) | −8.4 (−22.4) | −19.3 (−28.5) | −27.5 (−33.1) |
| Record low °F (°C) | −36 (−38) | −42 (−41) | −30 (−34) | −7 (−22) | 7 (−14) | 16 (−9) | 17 (−8) | 11 (−12) | 5 (−15) | −10 (−23) | −32 (−36) | −42 (−41) | −42 (−41) |
| Average precipitation inches (mm) | 1.69 (43) | 1.00 (25) | 1.20 (30) | 1.42 (36) | 1.60 (41) | 0.78 (20) | 0.52 (13) | 0.42 (11) | 0.56 (14) | 0.83 (21) | 1.13 (29) | 1.69 (43) | 12.84 (326) |
| Average snowfall inches (cm) | 27.8 (71) | 16.7 (42) | 14.9 (38) | 12.9 (33) | 3.9 (9.9) | 0.4 (1.0) | 0.0 (0.0) | 0.0 (0.0) | 0.3 (0.76) | 2.2 (5.6) | 14.3 (36) | 23.6 (60) | 117.0 (297) |
| Average extreme snow depth inches (cm) | 25.4 (65) | 25.8 (66) | 18.2 (46) | 5.6 (14) | 0.8 (2.0) | 0.0 (0.0) | 0.0 (0.0) | 0.0 (0.0) | 0.0 (0.0) | 0.6 (1.5) | 7.3 (19) | 16.1 (41) | 28.9 (73) |
| Average precipitation days (≥ 0.01 in) | 11.9 | 9.7 | 10.2 | 11.0 | 10.4 | 6.0 | 4.2 | 3.6 | 4.5 | 5.6 | 8.5 | 10.8 | 96.4 |
| Average snowy days (≥ 0.1 in) | 9.7 | 7.5 | 6.7 | 5.4 | 1.7 | 0.1 | 0.0 | 0.0 | 0.3 | 1.2 | 5.5 | 8.9 | 47.0 |
Source 1: NOAA
Source 2: National Weather Service

== See also ==
- List of dams in the Columbia River watershed
