= Lake Lahontan (reservoir) =

Reservoir in Lyon and Churchill counties in Nevada, United States

Lahontan Reservoir
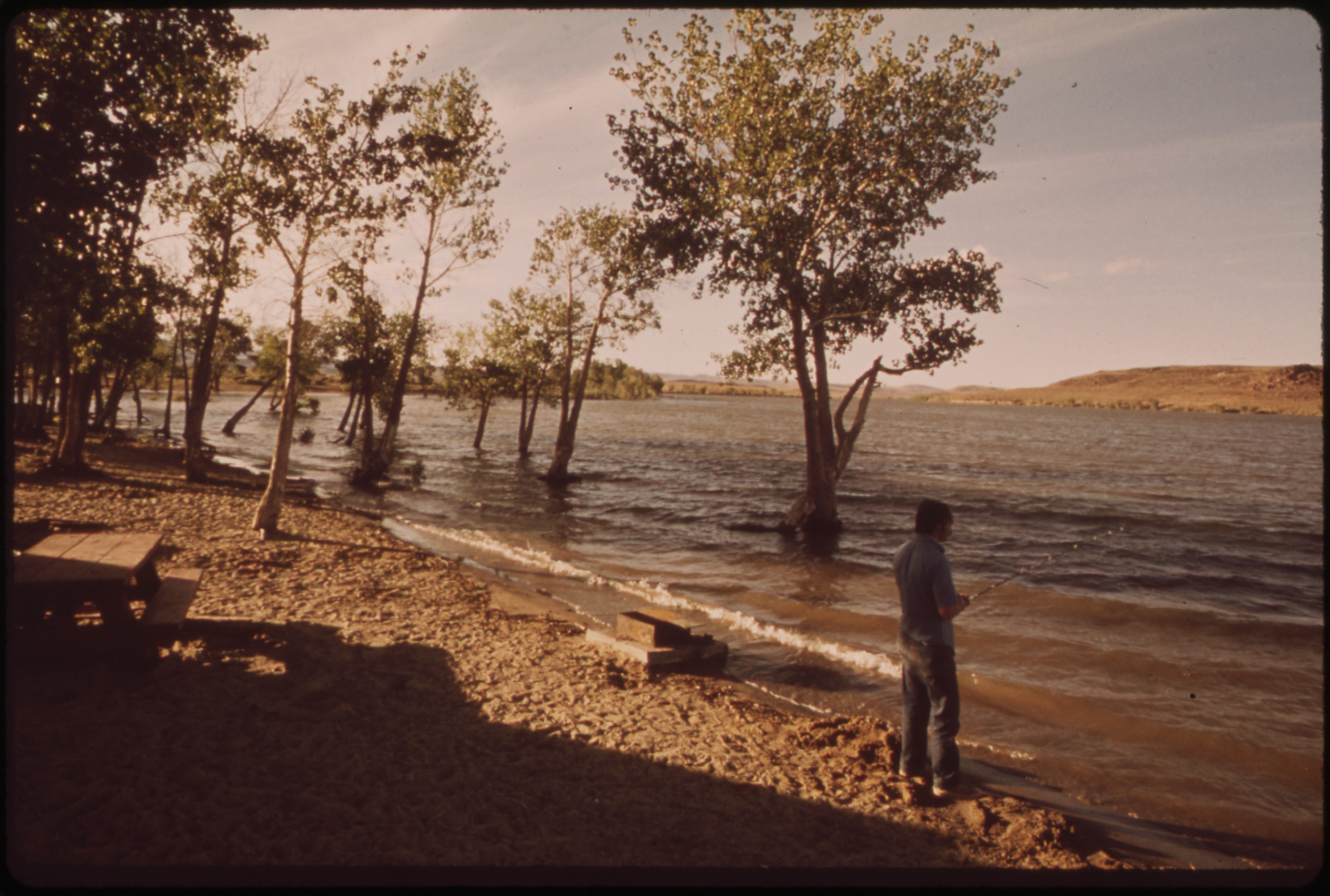
- Lahontan Reservoir overflowing in May, 1973

- Location within Nevada Location within the United States
- Location: Lyon / Churchill counties, Nevada
- Coordinates: 39°24′06″N 119°06′49″W
- Lake type: reservoir
- Primary inflows: Carson River
- Primary outflows: Carson River
- Catchment area: 1,799 sq mi (4,660 km^{2})
- Basin countries: United States
- Max. length: 17 mi (27 km)
- Surface elevation: 4,162 ft (1,269 m)

Lahontan Reservoir is a reservoir on the Carson River in Lyon and Churchill counties in Nevada, United States.

== Description ==
The reservoir is formed by the Lahontan Dam, built in 1905 by the Bureau of Reclamation as part of the Newlands Reclamation Act and is located between Fallon and Carson City. The flows from the Carson River are augmented by the diversions from the Truckee River. The reservoir is maintained by the Truckee-Carson Irrigation District (TCID). The lake is named after ancient Lake Lahontan, which covered much of northwestern Nevada during the last ice age.

Lahontan Reservoir is 17 miles (27 km) long and has 69 miles (111 km) of shoreline. It consists of several lobes connected by narrow straits. When full, it has approximately 10,000 acres (40 km^{2}) of surface area, although it is usually less than half full by late summer. As no water rights have been allocated for recreation, the TCID could completely drain the lake to supply its irrigation customers. Submerged beneath the water were parts of stagecoach routes which existed during the 1800s including Williams Station, the scene of the Battle of Williams Station, a minor skirmish during the Paiute War.

A small settlement called "Lahontan" once stood near the reservoir, which in 1940 the Federal Writers' Project reported had a population of 25.

== Recreation ==
The lake sits within the Lahontan State Recreation Area. Recreational uses include fishing, pleasure boating and camping. Much of the shoreline is sandy and makes for good camping. As it is contaminated with mercury from the Comstock and other mines, consumption of fish from the lake should be limited as per posted guidelines. Primary game fish include wipers (white bass x striper hybrid), white bass, walleye, channel catfish, white catfish, largemouth bass, spotted bass, and crappie. It is stocked with walleye fry and fingerling wipers nearly every year. The best fishing occurs from April through July and October.

== Variations ==
The Carson River enters the lake at its southwestern end. The lake is very shallow there, and the shoreline can vary drastically as the lake empties and fills. The Derby Dam diverts part of the Truckee River into the Truckee Canal which enters the lake at the northeastern end, immediately adjacent to the Lahontan dam.

During the 2017 California floods, the highest inflow in history filled the lake, and a weir was made to handle outflow. Oversized culverts were quickly put under US95 and lined with ripraps to let the water cross the road and protect Fallon from flooding.

== See also ==
- List of dams and reservoirs in Nevada
