= Springdale Municipal Airport =

Airport in Arkansas, United States

- IATA: SPZ; ICAO: KASG; FAA LID: ASG

Summary
- Airport type: Public
- Owner: City of Springdale
- Serves: Springdale, Arkansas
- Elevation AMSL: 1,353 ft (412 m)
- Coordinates: 36°10′35″N 094°07′09″W

Map
- Location of airport in Arkansas ASG (the United States)

Runways
Direction	Length		Surface
Direction	ft	m	Surface
18/36	5,302	1,616	Asphalt

Statistics (2019)
- Aircraft operations (year ending 4/30/2019): 62,450
- Based aircraft: 90
- Source: Federal Aviation Administration

Springdale Municipal Airport (IATA: SPZ, ICAO: KASG, FAA LID: ASG) is a public use airport in Washington County, Arkansas, United States. It is owned by the City of Springdale and located one nautical mile (2 km) southeast of its central business district. This airport is included in the National Plan of Integrated Airport Systems for 2011–2015, which categorized it as a general aviation facility.

Although most U.S. airports use the same three-letter location identifier for the FAA and IATA, this airport is assigned ASG by the FAA and SPZ by the IATA (which assigned ASG to Ashburton Aerodrome in Ashburton, New Zealand). The airport's ICAO identifier is KASG.

== Facilities and aircraft ==
Springdale Municipal Airport covers an area of 228 acres (92 ha) at an elevation of 1,353 feet (412 m) above mean sea level. It has one runway designated 18/36 with an asphalt surface measuring 5,302 by 76 feet (1,616 x 23 m).

For the 12-month period ending April 30, 2019, the airport had 62,450 aircraft operations, an average of 171 per day: 93% general aviation, 7% air taxi, and <1% military. At that time there were 90 aircraft based at this airport: 74 single-engine, 10 multi-engine, 3 jet, and 3 helicopter.

== Fixed Base Operator and Training ==
Springdale Municipal has one Fixed Base Operator at the west side of the airport. Summit aviation has fuel, snacks and clean bathrooms. The FBO building is also home to El Chefe Mexican Cuisine and ARH Flight training and aircraft services. ARH has two c172s and three helicopters available for training and general rental.

== See also ==
- List of airports in Arkansas
