= Lahontan Dam =

- Lahontan Dam and Power Station
- U.S. National Register of Historic Places
- Nevada Historical Marker No. 215
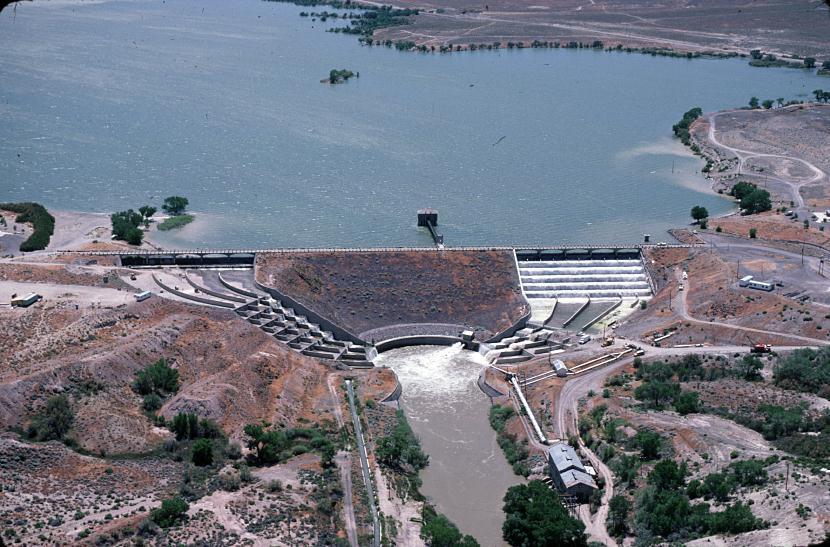
- The Lahontan Dam on the Carson River in the state of Nevada.

- Location within Nevada Location within the United States
- Location: Churchill County, Nevada, USA
- Nearest city: Fallon, Nevada
- Coordinates: 39°27′45″N 119°3′53″W
- Built: 1915
- MPS: Newlands Reclamation TR
- NRHP reference No.: 81000381
- Marker No.: 215
- Added to NRHP: March 25, 1981

The Lahontan Dam is a dam situated on the Carson River in the Carson Desert between Carson City, Nevada and Fallon in Nevada, United States. Its impoundment is known as the Lahontan Reservoir or Lake Lahontan. It is currently operated by the Truckee-Carson Irrigation District.

== Description ==
The Lahontan Dam was built by the Bureau of Reclamation as part of the Newlands Project. It is an earthen structure, 162 ft (49 m) high by 1,700 ft (520 m) long and contains 733,000 cu yd (560,000 m^{3}) of fill. When it was completed in 1915, it was the largest earth-fill dam in the United States. The reservoir receives water from an area of 1,450 mi^{2} (3,800 km^{2}) and provides a storage capacity of 295,500 acre⋅ft (364,500 dam^{3}) at spillway crest. An additional 23,900 acre⋅ft (29,500 dam^{3}) can be stored by raising the gates, bringing the total capacity to 319,400 acre⋅ft (394,000 dam^{3}).

The primary purpose of the dam is to impound water for irrigation use. The site also includes hydroelectric generators with a total capacity of 4,000 kilowatts.

== History ==
Construction began as part of the Truckee-Carson Project in 1911 and Lahontan City, Nevada, a company town, was built for the workers. Water distribution for irrigation began in 1916 and in the same year the project was renamed to the Newlands Project.

The population of Lahontan was 300 in 1940.

== See also ==
- List of dams and reservoirs in Nevada
