= Newlands Reclamation Act =

United States federal law

- Other short titles: Lowlands Reclamation Act of 1902
- Long title: An Act appropriating the receipts from the sale and disposal of public lands in certain States and Territories to the construction of irrigation works for the reclamation of arid lands.
- Nicknames: National Reclamation Act of 1902
- Enacted by: the 57th United States Congress
- Effective: June 17, 1902

Citations
- Public law: Pub. L. 57–161
- Statutes at Large: 32 Stat. 388

Legislative history
- Introduced in the Senate as S. 3057 by Francis G. Newlands (D–NV) on January 21, 1902; Committee consideration by Senate Public Lands, House Irrigation of Arid Lands; Passed the Senate on February 28, 1902 (Passed); Passed the House on June 13, 1902 (146-55); Signed into law by President Theodore Roosevelt on June 17, 1902

The Reclamation Act (also known as the Lowlands Reclamation Act or National Reclamation Act) of 1902 (Pub. L. 57–161) is a United States federal law that funded irrigation projects for the arid lands of 17 states in the American West.

The act at first covered only 16 of the western states, as delineated by the 100th meridian, as Texas had no federal lands. Texas was added later by a special act passed in 1906. The act set aside money from sales of semi-arid public lands for the construction and maintenance of irrigation projects. The newly irrigated land would be sold and money would be put into a revolving fund that supported more such projects. These irrigation projects led to the eventual damming of nearly every major western river. Under the act, the Secretary of the Interior created the United States Reclamation Service within the United States Geological Survey to administer the program. In 1907, the Service became a separate organization within the Department of the Interior and was renamed the United States Bureau of Reclamation.

The Act was co-authored by Democratic Congressional Representative Francis G. Newlands of Nevada, Frederick H. Newell of the United States Geological Survey, and George H. Maxwell, head of the National Reclamation Association. Many of the loans made to farmers, funded by the sales of federal land, were never repaid. Amendments made by the Reclamation Project Act of 1939 gave the Department of the Interior, among other things, the authority to amend repayment contracts and to extend repayment for not more than 40 years. Amendments made by the Reclamation Reform Act of 1982 (P.L. 97-293) eliminated the residency requirement provisions of reclamation law, raised the acreage limitation on lands irrigated with water supplied by the Bureau of Reclamation, and established and required full-cost rates for land receiving water above the acreage limit.

== Background ==
John Wesley Powell, arguably the "father of reclamation", began a series of expeditions to explore the American West in 1867. He concluded that the Western United States was so arid that it could not yet support extensive development, and government involvement in large-scale irrigation would be necessary. Among his observations, he saw that, after snowmelt and spring rains, the rivers of the West flooded and released huge amounts of water and that for the rest of the year not enough rain fell to sufficiently support agriculture, and so reservoir dams were necessary. The U.S. government saw too much economic potential in the West to heed Powell's advice, at the time.

By the late 1800s, small-scale private and local farming organizations would prove the benefits of irrigation projects in the arid western states. When it became apparent that an organized effort would be required to make agriculture viable in the West, Representative Francis G. Newlands of Nevada introduced legislation into the United States Congress to provide federal help and coordination for irrigation projects. Newlands carried the bulk of the legislative burden and had a strong technical backup from Frederick Haynes Newell of the Department of the Interior and George H. Maxwell, head of the National Reclamation Association. Conflict emerged over whether reclamation efforts ought to occur at the state level or at the federal level. President Theodore Roosevelt supported the national effort and assembled the legislative alliances that made passage of the act possible. After several years of effort, the resulting act passed on June 17, 1902.

The 1902 act was later amended by the Reclamation Reform Act of 1982 (Pub. L. 97–293, Title II) to limit the corporate use of water and speculation on land that would benefit from reclamation projects.

== Summary of the Act ==
The full name of the act is "An Act Appropriating the receipts from the sale and disposal of public lands in certain States and Territories to the construction of irrigation works for the reclamation of arid lands". The act identifies 16 states and territories included in the project: Arizona, California, Colorado, Idaho, Kansas, Montana, Nebraska, Nevada, New Mexico, North Dakota, Oklahoma, Oregon, South Dakota, Utah, Washington, and Wyoming. It requires surplus fees from sales of land be set aside for a "reclamation fund" for the development of water resources. It also requires the Treasury Department to fund education from unappropriated monies under certain conditions.

== Impact of the act ==
Below are listed the larger of the irrigation projects of the United States, with the area reclaimed or to be reclaimed as of 1925. (1)

- Arizona: Salt River, 182,000
- Arizona-California: Yuma, 158,000
- California: Orland, 20,000
- Colorado: Grand Valley, 53,000; Uncompahgre Valley, 140,000
- Idaho: Boise, 207,000; Minidoka, 120,500
- Kansas: Garden City, 10,677
- Montana: Blackfeet, 122,500; Flathead, 152,000; Fort Peck, 152,000; Huntley, 32,405; Milk River, 219,557; Sun River, 174,046
- Montana-North Dakota: Lower Yellowstone, 60,116
- Nebraska-Wyoming: North Platte, 129,270
- Nevada: Truckee-Carson, 206,000
- New Mexico: Carlsbad, 20,261; Hondo, 10,000; Rio Grande, 155,000
- North Dakota: North Dakota Pumping, 26, 314
- Oregon: Umatilla, 36,300
- Oregon-California: Klamath, 70,000
- South Dakota: Belle Fourche, 100,000
- Utah: Strawberry Valley, 50,000
- Washington: Okanogan, 10,999; Sunnyside, 102,824; Tieton (Teton), 34,071
- Wyoming: Shoshone, 164,122

Much of the West could not have been settled without the water provided by the Act. The West became one of the premier agricultural areas in the world. Bureau of Reclamation statistics shows that the more than 600 of their dams on waterways throughout the West provide irrigation for 10 million acres (40,000 km^{2}) of farmland, providing 60% of the nation's vegetables and 25% of its fruits and nuts. Currently, the Bureau operates about 180 projects in the West.

Not envisioned by the act, Bureau of Reclamation dams support 58 power plants producing 40 billion kilowatt hours of electricity annually. Most of the large population centers in the Far West owe their growth to these power sources.

== Affected river systems ==
- Colorado River system
- Columbia River system
- Missouri River system
- Rio Grande system

== See also ==
- Water in California
- Water in Colorado
- Water rights
- National Irrigation Congress
- Environmental history of the United States
