= United States historical military districts =

Historical military districts of the United States

There have been many United States Army historical military districts. Domestically, the United States Army has had military districts ranging from 1798 to 1881. They were reorganized several times: in 1800, in 1813, in 1815, in 1821, in 1837, in 1844, in 1848, in 1861, and in 1865. Internationally, military districts included Cuba, the Allied Military Government of Occupied Territories (containing Germany, Italy, Austria, and Japan post-WWII), South Korea, the Trust Territory of the Pacific Islands, and the Ryukyu Islands of Japan.

== U.S. military administration districts, departments, divisions ==
These entities were sometimes the only governmental authority in the listed areas, although they often co-existed with civil governments in scarcely populated states and territories.

- From June 14, 1798 until May 14, 1800, Maj. Gen. Charles Cotesworth Pinckney commanded a district that encompassed Georgia, Tennessee, North Carolina, South Carolina and Virginia. Brig. Gen. James Wilkinson commanded troops in the remaining states in the north and west.

=== 1800–1813 ===
From May 14, 1800, the army was divided into 11 geographical districts, with an informal alignment into western and eastern departments. On February 15, 1809, the Army was reorganized into Northern, Southern, and Western Military Districts. In June 1810, the Southern and Western Districts were consolidated as the Southern Department, and the Northern District was designated Northern Department.

- Defense of the City and Harbor of New York, 1812–13.
- 4th Brigade of Detached Militia, 1812–13,
- District of Oswego, Sackett's Harbor, and Ogdensburg, 1813

=== 1813–1815 ===
On March 19, 1813, during the War of 1812 the United States was divided into 9 numbered military districts. They were increased to 10 on July 2, 1814 and reduced to 9 by consolidation of the 4th and 10th Districts in January 1815.

- 1st Military District, 1813–15 (New Hampshire and Massachusetts, including current Maine)
- 2d Military District, 1814–15 (Rhode Island and Connecticut)
- 3d Military District, 1813–15 (New York "from the sea to the highlands," and East Jersey)
- 4th Military District, 1813–14 (West Jersey, Pennsylvania, Delaware)
- 4th and 10th Military Districts (consolidated), 1815
- 5th Military District, 1813–15 (Maryland and Virginia)
- 6th Military District, 1813–15 (North Carolina, South Carolina, Georgia)
- 7th Military District, 1813–15 (Tennessee, Louisiana, Mississippi territory)
- 8th Military District, 1813-15 (Kentucky, Ohio, territories of Indiana, Michigan, Illinois, Missouri)
- 9th Military District, 1813-15 (New York north of the highlands, and Vermont)
- 9th Military District and Right Wing (1st Division), Northern Army (under unified command), 1814–15
- Left Wing (2d Division), Northern Army, 1814
- 10th Military District, 1814 (Maryland, DC and part of eastern Virginia)

=== 1815–1821 ===
On May 17, 1815, the military districts were abolished, and superseded by 10 numbered Military Departments, divided equally between the Division of the North with 1st–5th Military Departments and Division of the South with the 6th–10th Military Departments.

=== 1821–37 ===
In May 1821, the Divisions of the North and South and the Military Departments were abolished and the Army reorganized into Eastern and Western Departments. From time to time various departments or Armies appeared in the Western Department.

- Western Department, 1821–37
  - Right Wing, Western Department, 1832–37
  - Army of the Frontier, 1832
  - 1st Army Corps, North West Army, 1832
  - Army of the Southwestern Frontier, 1834–37.
- Eastern Department, 1821–37

=== 1837–1844 ===
In 1837 the Army returned to a system of Divisions with subordinate numbered Military departments. Between 1842 and 1844, the Divisions were abolished with only the Military Departments in operation.

- Eastern Division, 1837–42
  - 7th Military Department, 1837–41
- Western Division, 1837–42
  - 1st Military Department, 1837–42
  - 2nd Military Department, 1837–42
  - 7th Military Department, 1841–42
- 1st Military Department, 1842–43
- 2nd Military Department, 1843–51
- 3rd Military Department, 1842–48
- 4th Military Department, 1842–53
- 5th Military Department, 1842–52
- 8th Military Department, 1842–46
- 9th Military Department, 1842–45 (Florida)

=== 1844–1848 ===
In 1844 the Army renewed the use of the Eastern and Western Divisions during the Mexican–American War.

- Eastern Division, 1844–48
  - 5th Military Department, 1844–48
  - 8th Military Department, 1844–46
- Western Division, 1844–48
  - 2nd Military Department, 1844–48
  - 3rd Military Departments, 1844–48
- 4th Military Department, 1844–53
- 9th Military Department, 1845 (Florida)
- 10th Military Department, 1846 – 1853 (California and Oregon to 1848)

=== 1848–1853 ===
Following the Mexican war, the army reorganized to occupy the vast new territory acquired.

- Eastern Division, 1848–53
  - 1st Military Department, 1848–53; consolidated 1st and 3d Military Departments, 1849–50
  - 2nd Military Department, 1848–51; consolidated 1st and 2d Military Departments, 1848–49
  - 3rd Military Departments, 1848, 1850–53
  - 4th Military Departments, 1848–53; consolidated 3d and 4th Military Departments, 1848
- Western Division, 1848–53
  - consolidated 5th and 6th Military Departments, 1848
  - 5th Military Department, 1848–52
  - 6th Military Department, 1848–53
  - 7th Military Department, 1848–53
  - 8th Military Department, 1848–49, 1851–53
  - 9th Military Department, 1849–53 (New Mexico)
- Pacific Division, 1848–53,(California and Oregon)
- 10th Military Department, 1846 – 1853 (California and Oregon to 1848, California only 1848-1850)
- 11th Military Department, 1848 – 1853 (Oregon)

=== 1853–1861 ===
After October 31, 1853 the division echelon was eliminated and the departments in the east became one Department of the East, administering all the territory east of the Mississippi River. The six western departments consolidated into four (Departments of Texas, New Mexico, the West, and the Pacific). The system returned to six departments in 1858 when the Department of Utah was created in January, and the Department of the Pacific split into the Departments of California and Oregon in September.

==== Eastern United States ====
- Department of the East, 1853 - August 17, 1861

==== Western United States ====
- Department of the West, 1853 - July 3, 1861 All U.S. lands between the Mississippi River and the Department of the Pacific not included in other Districts or Departments.
- Department of Texas, 1853 - April 22, 1861.
- Department of New Mexico, 1853 - June 27, 1865

==== Pacific area ====
- Department of the Pacific 1853-September 13, 1858; January 15, 1861 - June 27, 1865 Included all U.S. lands between the Rocky Mountains and the Pacific Ocean, not included in the Department of the West. Beginning in 1857, it was separated into the Department of Utah, June 30, 1857 - July 3, 1861, the Department of California, September 13, 1858 - January 15, 1861, and the Department of Oregon, September 13, 1858 - January 15, 1861.

=== 1861–1865 ===
During the American Civil War the Eastern Department was eliminated, exploding into many Departments, districts and subdistricts of the Union Army.

- Union Army Divisions, Departments and Districts

=== 1865-1881 ===
Following the end of the Civil War, five Reconstruction military districts were created containing the various Confederate states (see below references to First through Fifth Military District).

==== Eastern United States ====
- Military Division of the Atlantic, 1865–66
  - Department of the East, 1865–73; independent 1866-68
  - Middle Military Department, 1866
  - Department of North Carolina, 1865–66; to Department of the Carolinas
  - Department of South Carolina, 1865–66; to Department of the Carolinas
  - Department of the Carolinas, 1866; to Second Military District
  - Department of Virginia, 1865–66; to First Military District
- Division of the Atlantic, 1868–91
  - Department of the East, 1868–73
  - Department of the Lakes, 1868–73
  - Department of Washington, 1868–69

==== Southeastern United States ====
- Military Division of the Tennessee, 1865–67
  - Department of the South, 1865–66
  - Department of Alabama, 1865–66; to Third Military District
  - Department of Georgia, 1865–66; to Third Military District
  - Department of Kentucky, 1865–66
  - Department of Mississippi, 1865–66; to Fourth Military District
  - Department of Tennessee, 1865–66
  - Department of the Cumberland, 1866
  - District of Tennessee, 1866
    - Sub-district of Tennessee, 1866

==== Western United States ====
- Military Division of the Missouri (1865–1891).
  - Department of Dakota (1866–1911) Minnesota, Montana, North Dakota, and parts of Idaho, South Dakota and the Yellowstone portion of Wyoming.
  - Department of the Missouri (1865–1891) Arkansas, Kansas, Missouri, Indian Territory, and Territory of Oklahoma.
  - Department of the Platte (1866–1898) Iowa, Nebraska, Colorado, Dakota Territory, Utah Territory, Wyoming (except Yellowstone), and a portion of Idaho.
- Department of Texas (1865–66), 5th Military District (Reconstruction) 1867–70 and Department of Texas (1870–1913).
- Department of New Mexico, (1854–65) in New Mexico Territory; part of the Department of the Pacific and the Department of the West during the Civil war, became the District of New Mexico (1865–90) under the Military Division of the Pacific in 1865.
- Department of Utah, 1858–61; merged again into the Department of the Pacific being made

==== Pacific area ====
- Military Division of the Pacific (1865–1891).
  - Department of California (1865–1891) California, Nevada Territory, Arizona Territory, and part of New Mexico Territory.
    - District of Southern California, (1865–66)
    - District of Humboldt, (1865–69)
    - District of Arizona, (1865–70) became Department of Arizona
    - District of Utah 1865–66 then merged into the Department of the Platte
    - District of Nevada, (1865–70) discontinued
  - Department of Alaska (1868–1884) became the civilian-ruled District of Alaska.
  - Department of Arizona (1870–1891); Arizona Territory; included the District of New Mexico in New Mexico Territory after 1885.
  - Department of the Columbia (1865–1913) Oregon, Washington Territory, part of Idaho Territory, and Department of Alaska after 1870.

== 20th century ==
- Panama Canal Department
- Philippine Department
- Puerto Rico Department
- Antilles Department

== Overseas regions primarily under U.S. military administration ==
- Cuba (1898–1902)
- American WWII European Occupation Zones
  - American Occupation Zone of Austria (1945–1955)
  - American Occupation Zone of Germany (1945–1955)
    - American Occupation Zone of West Berlin (1945–1990)
  - Free Territory of Trieste, Zone A (1947–1954, administered jointly with the U.K.)
- South Korea (1945–1948)
- Pacific Trust Territories, (Micronesia under U.S. administration, 1947–1986)
- Ryukyu Islands, Japan (Okinawa, 1945–1972) - U.S. Army, Ryukyu Islands - see IX Corps (United States)

== See also ==
- Military district, for other countries
