= Department (United States Army) =

United States Army

Department is an organizational term used by the U.S. Army, mostly prior to World War I, to describe named geographical districts created for control and administration of installations and units. In 1920, most of the named departments were redesignated as numbered Corps Areas. However, the Hawaiian, Panama Canal, and Philippine Departments retained their old names. In 1939, the Puerto Rican Department was created and in May 1941 the Panama Canal and Puerto Rican Departments were combined as the Caribbean Defense Command, although each was still referred to as a department.

== 1800s ==
=== War of 1812 ===
The United States Army was divided into nine military districts by the War Department General Order, of 19 March 1813. They were increased to ten on 2 July 1814 but reduced to nine by consolidation of the 4th and 10th Military Districts in January 1815. Military districts were abolished, 17 May 1815.

=== 1815–21 ===
At the end of the War of 1812, Military districts were superseded by ten Military Departments, divided equally between Divisions of the North and South, 17 May 1815.

- Division of the North, 17 May 1815 – May 1821
  - 1st Military Department, 1815–17
  - 2nd Military Department, 1815–18
  - 3rd Military Department, 1815–17
  - Consolidated 1st and 3rd Military Departments, 1817–19
  - Consolidated 1st and 3rd Military Departments, 1818–21
  - 4th Military Department, 1815–19
  - Consolidated 1st, 3rd, and 4th Military Departments, 1819–21
  - 5th Military Department, 1815–21.
- Division of the South, 17 May 1815 – May 1821
  - 6th Military Department, 1815–1821
  - 7th Military Department, 1815–1821
  - 8th Military Department, 1815–19, 1820–21
  - 9th Military Department, June 1819 – June 1821
  - 10th Military Department, 1815–1821

=== 1821–1837 ===
Reorganization of the Army into Eastern and Western Departments, May 1821.

- Eastern Department, 1821–37
- Western Department, 1821–37
  - Right Wing, Western Department, 1832–37
  - Army of the Frontier, 1832
  - 1st Army Corps, North West Army, 1832
  - Army of the Southwestern Frontier, 1834–37

=== 1837–1844 ===
From 1837 to 1842, some of the departments were subordinated to the Eastern and Western Divisions.

- Eastern Division, 1837–42
  - 7th Military Department, 1837–41
- Western Division, 1837–42
  - 1st Military Department, 1837–42
  - 2nd Military Department, 1837–42
  - 7th Military Department, 1841–42
- 1st Military Department, 1843
- 2nd Military Department, 1843–51
- 3rd Military Department, 1842–48
- 4th Military Department, 1842–53
- 5th Military Department, 1842–52
- 8th Military Department, 1842–46
- 9th Military Department, 1842–45 (Florida)

=== 1844–1848 ===
The Eastern and Western Divisions were not restored until 1853.

- Eastern Division, 1844–48
  - 5th Military Department, 1844–48
  - 8th Military Department, 1844–46
- Western Division, 1844–48
  - 2nd Military Department, 1844–48
  - 3rd Military Departments, 1844–48
- 4th Military Department, 1842–53
- 9th Military Department, 1845
- 10th Military Department, 1846–1853 (California and Oregon to 1848)

=== 1848–1853 ===
All departments were subordinated under one of three Divisions.

- Eastern Division, 1848–53
  - 1st Military Department, 1848–53; consolidated 1st and 3d Military Departments, 1849–50
  - 2nd Military Department, 1848–51; consolidated 1st and 2d Military Departments, 1848–49
  - 3rd Military Departments, 1848, 1850–53
  - 4th Military Departments, 1848–53; consolidated 3d and 4th Military Departments, 1848
- Western Division, 1848–53
  - consolidated 5th and 6th Military Departments, 1848
  - 5th Military Department, 1848–52
  - 6th Military Department, 1848–53
  - 7th Military Department, 1848–53
  - 8th Military Department, 1848–49, 1851–53
  - 9th Military Department, 1849–53 (New Mexico)
- Pacific Division, 1848–53,(California and Oregon)
  - 10th Military Department, 1846–1853 (California and Oregon to 1848)
  - 11th Military Department, 1848–1853 (Oregon)

=== 1853–1861 ===
After 31 October 1853 the division echelon was eliminated and the six western departments consolidated into four (Departments of Texas, New Mexico, the West, and the Pacific), whose department commanders employed their troops as they saw fit. The system returned to six departments in 1858 when the Department of Utah was created in January, and the Department of the Pacific split into the Departments of California and Oregon in September.

- Department of the East, 1853 – 17 August 1861
- Department of the West, 1853 – 3 July 1861
- Department of Texas, 1853 – 22 April 1861
- Department of the Pacific, 1853 – September 13, 1858; 15 January 1861 – 27 June 1865
- Department of New Mexico, 1853 – 27 June 1865
- Department of Utah, 30 June 1857 – 3 July 1861
- Department of the Platte, 4 April 1858 – 16 May 1859
- Department of California, 13 September 1858 – 15 January 1861
- Department of Oregon, 13 September 1858 – 15 January 1861

=== 1861–1865 Civil War ===
During the American Civil War, a department was a geographical command within the Union's military organization, usually reporting directly to the War Department. Many of the Union's departments were named after rivers, such as the Department of the Potomac and the Department of the Tennessee. The geographical boundaries of such departments changed frequently, as did their names. As the armies became larger, departments began to be subordinated to military divisions, and the departments were often subdivided into Districts and from 1862, subdistricts. Much information on Civil War departments can be found in Eicher & Eicher, Civil War High Commands.

- Union Army Divisions, Departments and Districts

=== 1865–67 ===
- Military Division of the Atlantic, 1865–66
  - Department of the East, 1865–73; independent 1866–68
  - Middle Military Department, 1866
  - Department of North Carolina, 1865–66; to Department of the Carolinas
  - Department of South Carolina, 1865–66; to Department of the Carolinas
  - Department of the Carolinas, May 1866; renamed Department of the South, June 1866; to Second Military District
  - Department of Virginia, 1865–66; to First Military District
- Military Division of the Tennessee, 1865–67
  - Department of Alabama, 1865–66
  - Department of Georgia, 1865–66
  - Department of the South, 1866; to Third Military District
  - Department of Kentucky, 1865–66
  - Department of Mississippi, 1865–66; to Fourth Military District
  - Department of Tennessee, 1865–66
  - Department of the Cumberland, 1866
  - District of Tennessee, 1866
    - Sub-district of Tennessee, 1866
- Military Division of the Missouri, 1865; to Military Division of the Missouri
  - Department of Arkansas, 1865; to Military Division of the Gulf
  - Department of the Missouri, 1865; to Military Division of the Mississippi
  - Department of the Northwest, 1865; merged into Department of the Missouri
- Military Division of the Mississippi, 1865–66
  - Department of the Ohio, 1865–66
  - Department of Arkansas, 1865–66; to Military Division of the Missouri
  - Department of the Missouri, 1865–66; to Military Division of the Missouri
  - Department of the Platte, 1866; to Military Division of the Missouri
- Military Division of the Gulf, 1865–66
  - Department of Arkansas, 1865; to Military Division of the Mississippi
  - Department of Louisiana, 1865–66; to Fifth Military District
  - Department of Texas, 1865–66; to Fifth Military District
  - Department of Florida, 1865–66; to Third Military District
  - Department of Mississippi, 1865; to Military Division of the Tennessee
- Military Division of the Pacific, 1865–68, Division of the Pacific 1869–91
  - Department of the Columbia, 1865–1913
  - Department of California, 1865–1913
    - Military District of Alaska, 18 October 1867 – 18 March 1868
  - Department of Alaska, 18 March 1868 – 1 July 1870; merged into Department of the Columbia
- Military Division of the Missouri, 1866–91
  - Department of Arkansas, 1866–67; to Fourth Military District
  - Department of Dakota, 1866–91
  - Department of the Missouri, 1866–91
  - Department of the Platte, 1866–91
  - Department of Texas, 1871–80

=== Military Reconstruction from 22 March 1867 ===
- First Military District, 1867–70 (Virginia)
- Second Military District, 1867–68 (North Carolina and South Carolina)
- Third Military District, 1867–68 (Georgia, Alabama and Florida)
- Fourth Military District, 1867–70 (Arkansas and Mississippi)
- Fifth Military District, 1866–70 (Texas and Louisiana)
- Military District of Georgia, 1870–71

=== 1868–1904 ===
- Division of the Atlantic, 1868–91
  - Department of the East, 1868–73
  - Department of the Lakes, 1868–73
  - Department of Washington, 1868–69
  - 1st Military District, 1869–70 (Virginia)
  - Department of Virginia, 1870
  - Department of the South, 1876–83
  - Department of the Gulf, 1877–78
  - Department of the East, 1877–91
- Division of the South, 1869–76
  - Department of the Cumberland, 1869–70
  - Department of the Gulf, 1871–75
  - Department of Louisiana, 1869–70
  - Department of the South, 1869–76
  - Department of Texas, 1870–71
  - 4th Military District, 1869–70 (Arkansas and Mississippi)
  - District of Baton Rouge, 1876
  - 1st Subdistrict of Georgia, 1870–71
- Division of the Pacific, 1869–91
  - Department of Alaska, 1869–70
  - District of Arizona, 1869–70
  - District of the Humboldt, 1869
  - Sub-district of Southern Arizona, 1869–70
  - Department of Arizona, 1870–91
  - Department of California, 1870–91
  - Department of the Columbia, 1870–91
- Department of the South, 1876–83
  - Fort Johnson, NC, 1876–81
- Military Division of the Gulf, 1881
  - Department of Arkansas, 1881
  - Department of Texas, 1881
- Department of Texas, 1882–1904
- Department of the East, 1891–1904
- Department of the Platte, 1891–98
- Department of the Missouri, 1891–1904
- Department of Dakota, 1891–1904
- Department of Arizona, 1891–1893
- Department of California, 1891–1904
- Department of the Columbia, 1891–1904
- Department of Colorado, 1893–1904
- Department of Alaska, 1900–01

=== 1898–99 Spanish–American War, Philippine Insurrection, Moro Rebellion ===
- Department of the Lakes, 1898–1913
- Department of the Gulf, 1898–99
- Department of California, 1898
  - Military District of Hawaii, 22 Sep – 7 November 1898
- Department of the Pacific and 8th Army Corps, 1898 – 20 March 1900
- Division of the Philippines, 20 March 1900 – 1911
  - Northern Luzon, 1900–02
  - Department of Southern Luzon, 1900–01
  - Department of Visayas, 1900–11
  - Department of Mindanao and Jolo, 1900–14
  - Department of North Philippines, 1901–02
  - Department of South Philippines, 1901–02
  - Department of Luzon, 1902–14

== 1900s ==
=== 1904–1911 ===
The Army departments were reorganized under new divisions until 1907, when the division echelon was disbanded.

- Atlantic Division, 1903–07
  - Department of the East, 1903–13
  - Department of the Gulf, 1904–13
- Northern Division, 1904–07
  - Department of Dakota, 1904–11
  - Department of the Lakes, 1904–11
  - Department of the Missouri, 1904–07
- Southwestern Division, 1904–07
  - Department of Colorado, 1904–11
  - Department of Texas, 1904–13
- Pacific Division, 1904–07
  - Department of California, 1904–13
    - District of Hawaii, 1910–1911
  - Department of the Columbia, 1904–13

=== Western Division (United States Army) 1911–1913 ===
The departments where again organized under new divisions.

- Eastern Division, 1911–13
  - Department of the East, 1911–13
  - Department of the Gulf, 1911–13
- Central Division, 1911–13
  - Department of the Lakes, 1911–13
  - Department of the Missouri, 1911–13
  - Department of Texas, 1911–13
- Western Division, 1911–13
  - Department of California, 1911–13
  - Department of the Columbia, 1911–13
  - District of Hawaii, 1911–13
- Philippines Division, 1911–1913
  - Department of Mindanao and Jolo, 1911–14
  - Department of Luzon, 1911–14

=== "Stimson Plan" 1913 – 1 May 1917 ===
- Eastern Department, 1913–1920
- Southern Department, 1913–1920
- Central Department, 1913–1920
- Western Department, 1913–1920
- Hawaiian Department, 1913–1920
- Philippine Department, 1913–1942
  - Department of Mindanao and Jolo, 1913–14
  - Department of Luzon, 1913–14
- North Atlantic, South Atlantic, and Pacific Coast Artillery Districts

=== 1 May 1917 – 1920 ===
- Northeastern Department
  - Northeastern Coast Artillery District
- Eastern Department
  - Eastern Coast Artillery District
- Southeastern Department
  - Southeastern Coast Artillery District
- Southern Department
  - Southern Coast Artillery District
- Central Department
- Western Department
  - Western Coast Artillery District
- Hawaiian Department
- Philippine Department
- Panama Canal Department, 26 June 1917 – 1920
  - Panama Coast Artillery District, 26 June 1917 – 1920

== See also ==
- Departments of the Continental Army
- Corps area
