= Union Army Divisions, Departments and Districts =

During the American Civil War, a department was a geographical command within the Union's military organization, usually reporting directly to the War Department. Many of the Union's departments were named after rivers or other bodies of water, such as the Department of the Potomac and the Department of the Tennessee. The geographical boundaries of such departments changed frequently, as did their names. As the armies became larger Departments began to be subordinated to Military Divisions, and the Departments were often sub divided into Districts and from 1862 Subdistricts. Much information on Civil War departments can be found in Eicher & Eicher, Civil War High Commands.

== Civil War ==
=== 1861 ===
==== Eastern Theater ====
- Department of the East, to August 17, 1861 (Discontinued)
- Department of Washington, April 9, 1861 - July 25, 1861 (Merged into Military District of the Potomac)
- Department of Pennsylvania, April 27, 1861 - July 25, 1861 (Merged into Department of the Potomac)
- Department of Annapolis, April 27, 1861, - July 19, 1861; renamed Department of Maryland, July 19, 1861 - July 25, 1861, (Merged into Dept. of Pennsylvania)
- Department of Virginia, May, 1861 - July 15. 1863 (Merged into Dept. of Virginia and North Carolina)
- Department of Northeastern Virginia, May 27, 1861 – July 25, 1861 (Merged into the Military District of the Potomac)
- Department of the Shenandoah July 19, 1861 - August 17, 1861 (Merged into the Department of the Potomac)
- Military District of the Potomac July 25 - August 15, 1861: renamed Department and Army of the Potomac, August 15, 1861 - June 27, 1865
  - Coast Division, 1861–62
  - Dix's Division, 1861–62
- Department of New England, Oct 1, 1861 - February 20, 1862. (Discontinued)
- Department of New York, October 26, 1861 - January 3, 1863 (Merged into Department of the East)
- Department of the Rappahannock, April 4, 1862 - June 26, 1862 (Merged into the Army of Virginia)
- Mountain Department, March 11, 1862 - June 26, 1862 (Merged into the Army of Virginia)

==== Lower Seaboard Theater ====
- Department of Florida, Apr. 13, 1861 - March 15, 1862 (Merged into Department of the South)
- South Carolina Expeditionary Corps, October 1861 - April 1862

==== Western Theater ====
- Department of the Cumberland, September–November 1861; Army of the Ohio, 1861 - October 24, 1862 (Renamed (Army of the Cumberland)
- Department of the Ohio and Department of the Ohio (Louisville), May 3, 1861 - March 11, 1862 (dissolved and merged into the Department of the Mississippi and the Mountain Department)
  - Army of Occupation of Western Virginia, June 14 - September 19, 1861
- Department of Kentucky, May 28, 1861 - August 15, 1861 (Merged into the Dept. of the Cumberland)
- Department of Western Virginia, October 11, 1861 - March 11, 1862. (Merged into Mountain Department)
  - District of the Kanawha, 1861-62 (Merged into Mountain Department)
  - Railroad District, 1861–62
  - Camp Carlisle, VA, later renamed Camp Willey, WV, 1861–64
  - Post at Grafton, WV, 1862
  - Post at Point Pleasant, WV, 1862

==== Trans-Mississippi Theater ====
- Department of the West, to July 3, 1861 (merged into the Western Department)
  - Army of the West, July 2 - August 10, 1861
- Western Department, July 3 - November 9, 1861
  - Kansas Brigade, 1861
  - Army of the West, July 2 - August 10, 1861
  - Western Army, September 14 - October 24, 1861
- Department of the Missouri, November 9, 1861–62
  - District of Cairo, 1861–62
  - District of Southeast Missouri, 1861
  - District of Central Missouri, 1861–65
  - Southwestern District, 1861–62
  - St. Louis District, 1861–65
  - Army of the West, 1861
- Department of Kansas, November 9, 1861–65
- Department of New Mexico, to July 3, 1861, (merged into Western Department); Restored November 9, 1861 - June 27, 1865
  - post at Albuquerque, NM, - 1865
  - District of Santa Fe, 1861–62
  - Eastern District of New Mexico, 1861–62
  - Southern District of New Mexico, 1861–62

==== Pacific Theater ====
- Pacific Department, January 15, 1861 - July 27, 1865
  - District of California, January 15, 1861–64
  - District of Oregon, January 15, 1861- July 27, 1865
  - District of Southern California, September 25, 1861 - July 27, 1865
  - California Volunteers, August 1861 - 1866
  - Column from California, December 9, 1861–62
  - District of Humboldt, December 12, 1861 - 1869

=== 1862 ===
==== Eastern Theater ====
- Department of North Carolina, January 7, 1862 - July 15, 1863 (Merged into Department of Virginia and North Carolina)
  - Burnside's North Carolina Expedition, February - June 1862
- Middle Department, March 22, 1862 - June 26, 1862; consolidated Middle Department and 8th Army Corps, June 26, 1862 - June 27, 1865
  - VIII Corps, July 12, 1862 - June 26, 1862
  - Railroad District, June 26, 1862 - Sept. 20, 1862
- Department of the Rappahannock, April 4, 1862 - June 26, 1862 (Merged into the Army of Virginia)
- Department of the Shenandoah, Recreated April 4, 1862 - June 26, 1862 (Merged into Army of Virginia)
- Army of Virginia, June 26, 1862 - September 12, 1862 (Merged into Army of the Potomac)
  - I Corps, Army of Virginia from Mountain Department, June 26, 1862 - September 12, 1862 (renamed XI Corps)
  - II Corps, Army of Virginia from Dept. of the Shenandoah, June 26, 1862 - September 2, 1862 (renamed XII Corps)
  - III Corps, Army of Virginia from Dept. of the Rappahannock, June 26, 1862 - September 2, 1862 (renamed I Corps)
- Department and Army of the Potomac, - 1865
  - Coast Division, - February 1862 (to Burnside's North Carolina Expedition)
  - Dix's Division, - March 22, 1862, (to Middle Department)
  - I Corps, March 3, 1862 - June 26, 1862 (to Army of Virginia)
  - I Corps, September 2, 1862 -
  - II Corps, March 3, 1862 - 1863
  - III Corps, March 3, 1862 - 1863
  - IV Corps, March 3, 1862 - August 1862, to Dpt. of Virginia
  - V Corps, March 3, 1862 - 1863
  - VI Corps, June 26, 1862 - 1863
  - IX Corps, July 22, 1862 - 1863
  - XI Corps, September 12, 1862 – 1864
  - Military District of Washington, 1862
    - Sturgis' Division - June 26, 1862 (Merged into Army of Virginia)
  - Defenses of Harpers Ferry, WV (Pleasant Valley, MD), 1862
  - Defenses of Washington, 1862-1863
    - Military Defenses, Southwest Potomac, 1862
- Department of Virginia, - July 15. 1863

==== Lower Seaboard Theater ====
- Department of Key West, February 1862 - March 15, 1862.(Merged into Department of the South)
- Department of the Gulf, February 23, 1862 - June 27, 1865
  - Army of the Gulf, February 23, 1862 - June 27, 1865
  - Troops in West Florida, August 8, 1862 - 1863 (from Dept. of the South)
- Department of the South, March 15, 1862 - June 28, 1865
  - South Carolina Expeditionary Corps - April 1862
  - Western District, 1862
  - Southern District, 1862
  - Northern District, 1862
  - U.S. Forces, Edisto and James Islands, SC, 1862
  - posts at Hilton Head, SC, 1862–64
  - posts at St. Augustine, FL, 1862–63
  - posts at Fort Taylor, FL, 1862
  - posts at Fort Pickens, FL, 1862
  - Troops in West Florida - August 8, 1862 - 63(annexed to Dept. of the Gulf)

==== Western Theater ====
- Department of the Ohio - August 19, 1862 - January 17, 1865 (Annexed to Department of the Cumberland)
  - District of Louisville, 1862
  - Railroad District of Western Virginia, Sept. 1862 - Jan 1863
  - District of Western Kentucky, 1862–63
  - Army of Kentucky, 1862–63
  - District of Central Kentucky, 1863
  - District of Ohio, 1863
  - Army of Ohio in the Field, 1863
  - (Military) District of Kentucky, 1863–65
- Department of the Cumberland, October 24, 1862 - June 27, 1865
  - Army of the Cumberland, October 24, 1862 - June 27, 1865
- Mountain Department March 11, 1862 - June 26, 1862 (Merged into Army of Virginia)
  - Cheat Mountain District, 1862.
  - District of the Kanawha, 1862.
  - Railroad District, March 11, 1862 - July 7, 1862
- Department of Mississippi March 15 - September 19, 1862
- Department and Army of the Tennessee, October 16, 1862 - August 1, 1865

==== Trans-Mississippi Theater ====
- Department of the Missouri, 1862–65
- Department of the Northwest September 6, 1862 - June 27, 1865 (merged with the Department of the Missouri)
- Department of Kansas, - 1865
- Department of New Mexico, to June 27, 1865
  - District of Santa Fe, - 1862
  - Eastern District of New Mexico, - 1862
  - Southern District of New Mexico, - 1862
  - post at Albuquerque, NM, - 1865
  - post at Fort Canby, NM, 1862–65
  - post at Fort Craig, NM, 1862–65
  - post at Las Cruces, NM, 1862–65
  - post at Los Pinos, NM, 1862–65
  - post at Fort Marcy, NM, 1862–65
  - post at Camp Mimbres, NM, 1862–65
  - post at Fort Sumner, NM, 1862–65
  - post at Fort West, NM, 1862–65

==== Pacific Theater ====
- Pacific Department, - July 27, 1865
  - District of California, - 1864
  - District of Oregon, - 1865
  - District of Southern California, - 1865
  - California Volunteers, - 1866
  - District of the Humboldt, - 1869
  - Column from California, - August 30, 1862
  - District of Arizona, (headquarters at Franklin, TX) August 30, 1862 - 1865
  - District of Utah August 6, 1862 - July 27, 1865

=== 1863 ===
==== Eastern Theater ====
- Department of the East, January 3, 1863 - 1873
  - District of Western New York, 1864–65
  - District of Northern New York, 1864–65
  - District of New Jersey, 1865
  - District of Rhode Island and Connecticut, 1865
  - District of Maine, 1865–66
  - District of Massachusetts, New Hampshire, and Vermont, 1865–66
  - District of Northern and Western New York, 1865–66
  - District of Champlain, 1866
- consolidated Middle Department and 8th Army Corps, June 26, 1862 - June 27, 1865
  - Defenses of the Upper Potomac, Jan 5 - Feb 1863. (Discontinued)
  - District of Delaware, 1863–65
- Department and Army of the Potomac, - 1865
  - I Corps, September 2, 1862 -
  - II Corps, March 3, 1862 - 1863
  - III Corps, March 3, 1862 - 1863
  - IV Corps, March 3, 1862 - August 1862, to Department of Virginia
  - V Corps, March 3, 1862 - 1863
  - VI Corps, June 26, 1862 - 1863
  - IX Corps, July 22, 1862 - April 2, 1863 to Department of Ohio
  - XI Corps, September 12, 1862 – 1864
- consolidated Department of Washington and XXII Corps, February 2, 1863 - 1865
- Department of the Susquehanna, June 9, 1863 - December 1, 1864 (Changed to Dept. of Pennsylvania)
- Department of Virginia - July 15, 1863
- Department of North Carolina - July 15, 1863
- Department of Virginia and North Carolina, July 15, 1863 - January 31, 1865

==== Lower Seaboard Theater ====
- Department of the South, 1863- June 28, 1865
  - X Corps (Union Army), 1863
  - posts at Hilton Head, SC, -1864
  - posts at St. Augustine, FL, - 1863

==== Western Theater ====
- Department of the Monongahela, June 9, 1863 - April 6, 1864 (Merged into Dept. of the Susquehanna)
- Department of West Virginia, June, 1863 - June 27, 1865
- Department of the Ohio - October 16, 1863
  - District of Indiana, March 23, 1863 - June 5, 1863
  - District of Indiana and Michigan, June 5, 1863 - September 11, 1863
  - District of Indiana, September 11, 1863 - November 16, 1863
  - Railroad District of Western Virginia, - Jan 1863
  - District of Western Kentucky, - 1863
  - Army of Kentucky, - 1863
  - District of Central Kentucky, 1863
  - District of Ohio, 1863
  - Army of Ohio in the Field, 1863
  - (Military) District of Kentucky, 1863–65
- Department of the Cumberland, 1863 - October 16, 1863
  - Army of the Cumberland, 1863 - June 27, 1865
- Department and Army of the Tennessee, 1863 - October 16, 1863
- Military Division of the Mississippi, October 16, 1863 – August 6, 1866
  - Department of the Cumberland, October 16, 1863–65
  - Department of the Ohio, October 16, 1863–65
  - Department of the Tennessee, October 16, 1863–64
  - XIX Corps, 1864
  - Department of North Carolina, 1865

==== Trans-Mississippi Theater ====
- Department of the Northwest, - June 27, 1865
- Department of the Missouri, - 1865
- Department of Kansas, - 1865
- Department of New Mexico, to June 27, 1865
  - post at Albuquerque, NM, - 1865
  - post at Fort Canby, NM, - 1865
  - post at Las Cruces, NM, - 1865
  - post at Los Pinos, NM, - 1865
  - post at Fort Marcy, NM, - 1865
  - post at Camp Mimbres, NM, - 1865
  - post at Fort Sumner, NM, - 1865
  - post at Fort West, NM, - 1865
  - District of Fort Craig, August 27, 1864 – November 23, 1864
    - post at Fort Craig, NM, August 27, 1864 – November 23, 1864
    - Fort McRae, NM, Oct. 1863 - 1876
  - post at Franklin, TX, 1863-64.

==== Pacific Theater ====
- Department of the Pacific - July 27, 1865

=== 1864 ===
==== Eastern Theater ====
- Middle Military Division, August 6, 1864 - June 27, 1865
  - consolidated Middle Department and 8th Army Corps, - June 27, 1865
    - District of Delaware, - 1865
    - District of Eastern Shore of Maryland, 1864–65
  - Department of Pennsylvania December 1, 1864–65
  - Department of the Susquehanna, 1864
  - Department of Washington, 1864–65
  - Department of West Virginia, 1864-65.
- Department and Army of the Potomac, 1864 - June 27, 1865
- Department of Virginia and North Carolina - January 31, 1865
  - Army of the James, April 28, 1864 - August 1, 1865
    - XVIII Corps, April 28, 1864 - December 3, 1864
    - X Corps, April 28, 1864 - December 3, 1864
    - XXV Corps, December 3, 1864 - May, 1865
    - XXIV Corps, December 3, 1864 - August 1, 1865
  - Expedition to Fort Fisher, December, 1864 - January 15, 1865

==== Lower Seaboard Theater ====
- Department of the South, 1864 - June 28, 1865
  - U.S. Forces, Morris Island, SC, 1864–65;
  - posts at Hilton Head, SC, -1864
  - Northern District, 1864–65
  - District of Florida, 1864–65
- Department of the Gulf, - May 7, 1864
- Military Division of West Mississippi May 7, 1864 - May 1865 (Discontinued)
  - consolidated Department of Arkansas and 7th Army Corps, May 7, 1864 - March 21, 1865 (transferred to Military Division of Missouri)
    - District of Little Rock, May 7, 1864 - March 21, 1865
    - Fort Smith and Indian Territory, May 7, 1864 - March 21, 1865
  - Department of the Gulf, May 7, 1864 - May, 1865

==== Western Theater ====
- Northern Department, January 12, 1864 - June 27, 1865
  - District of Illinois, 1864–65
    - Post at Camp Douglas (Post of Chicago), 1864–65
  - District of Indiana, 1864–65
    - Post at Rock Island Barracks, IL,
    - Post at Camp Carrington, 1864–65
    - Post at Evansville, 1864–65
    - Post at Indianapolis, 1864–65
    - Post at Madison, 1864–65
    - Post at Camp Morton, 1864–65
    - Post atBurnside Barracks (Indianapolis), 1864–65
    - Post at New Albany, IN, 1864–65
  - District of Michigan, 1864–65
    - Post of Detroit, MI, 1864–65
  - U.S. Forces, Johnson's Island, OH, 1864
  - Post at Johnson's Island, OH, 1864-65.
  - Post at Sandusky, OH, 1864-65.
- Military Division of the Mississippi, - August 6, 1866
  - Department of the Cumberland, - 1865
  - Department of the Ohio, - 1865
    - District of East Tennessee April 10, 1864 - Jan. 4, 1865 (to Dept. of the Cumberland)
  - Department of the Tennessee, - 1864; to Army of Georgia
  - XIX Corps, 1864
- Army of Georgia, November 1864 - June 1, 1865
  - XIV Corps November 1864 - June 1, 1865
  - XX Corps November 1864 - June 1, 1865

==== Trans-Mississippi Theater ====
- Department of the Northwest, - June 27, 1865
- Department of the Missouri, - 1865
- Department of Kansas, 1864–65
  - District of North Kansas, 1864–65
  - Districts of South Kansas, 1864–65
  - East Sub-district of Nebraska, 1864–65
- consolidated Department of Arkansas and 7th Army Corps, January 6, 1864 - May 7, 1864, to Military Division West Mississippi
  - District of Little Rock, January 6, 1864 - March 21, 1865
  - Fort Smith, April 17, 1864 - March 21, 1865
- Department of New Mexico, to June 27, 1865
  - District of Northern Arizona October 23, 1863 - 1864

==== Pacific Theater ====
- Department of the Pacific - July 27, 1865
  - District of California
    - Sub-district of Nevada (headquartered at Fort Churchill)
  - District of Oregon

=== 1865 ===
==== Eastern Theater ====
- Middle Military Division, - June 27, 1865
  - consolidated Middle Department and 8th Army Corps, - June 27, 1865
    - District of Delaware, - 1865
    - District of Eastern Shore of Maryland, - 1865
    - District of Delaware and Eastern Shore of Maryland, 1865
    - District of Western Maryland, 1865
    - District of West Virginia, 1865
    - District of Baltimore, 1865 - 1866
  - Department of Pennsylvania, - 1865
  - Department of Washington, - 1865
  - Department of West Virginia, - 1865
- Department and Army of the Potomac, 1864 - June 27, 1865
- Department of Virginia and North Carolina, - January 31, 1865
  - Army of the James, - January 31, 1865
    - XXV Corps, - January 31, 1865
    - XXIV Corps, - January 31, 1865
  - Expedition to Fort Fisher, - January 15, 1865
- Department of Virginia and Army of the James, January 31, 1865 - April 19, 1865
  - Army of the James, January 31, 1865 - August 1, 1865
    - XXV Corps, January 31, 1865 - May, 1865
    - XXIV Corps, January 31, 1865 - August 1, 1865
  - District of Eastern Virginia, 1865
    - Sub District of Appomattox, 1865
    - Sub District of Holston, 1865
  - Provost Marshal field organizations, Bermuda Hundred, Drummondtown, Camp Hamilton, Norfolk, Onancock, and Petersburg, VA, 1865
  - U.S. Forces, Petersburg, VA, 1865
  - Defenses of Norfolk and Portsmouth, VA, 1865
  - Camp of Distribution, Richmond, VA, 1865;
  - Libby Prison, Richmond, VA, 1865
  - Norfolk Military Prison, VA, 1865
  - post at Newport News, VA, 1865.
  - post at Petersburg, VA, 1865.
  - Department of North Carolina, January 31, 1865 - April 19, 1865
- Military Division of the James, April 19, 1865 - June 27, 1865
  - Department of Virginia, April 19, 1865 - June 27, 1865
  - Department of North Carolina, April 19, 1865 - June 27, 1865
  - Army of the James, April 19, 1865 - August 1, 1865
    - XXV Corps, April 19, 1865 - May, 1865
    - XXIV Corps, April 19, 1865 - August 1, 1865

==== Lower Seaboard Theater ====
- Department of the South, - June 28, 1865
  - U.S. Forces, Morris Island, SC, -1865
  - (Military) District of Eastern South Carolina, 1865
  - District of Savannah, 1865
  - posts at Jacksonville, FL, 1865

==== Western Theater ====
- Military Division of the Mississippi, - August 6, 1866
  - Department of the Cumberland, - 1865
    - District of East Tennessee, January. 4 - March. 17, 1865 (to Dept. of the Cumberland)
  - Department of the Ohio, - 1865
  - Department of North Carolina, 1865
- Army of Georgia, November 1864 - June 1, 1865
  - XIV Corps - June 1, 1865
  - XX Corps - June 1, 1865
- Department of Kentucky, February 10, 1865 - June 27, 1865

==== Trans-Mississippi Theater ====
- Department of the Northwest, - June 27, 1865
- Department of the Missouri, - June 27, 1865
- Department of Kansas, - June 27, 1865
  - District of North Kansas, - 1865
  - Districts of South Kansas, - 1865
  - East Sub-district of Nebraska, - 1865
- Department of New Mexico, to June 27, 1865 (became District of New Mexico, Department of California, Military Division of the Pacific)
- Military Division of the Southwest May 29, 1865 - June 27, 1865. (Territory in the Trans - Mississippi south of the Arkansas River - Major General Philip H. Sheridan. Merged into the Military Division of the Gulf)
  - Department of Louisiana and Texas, May 29, 1865 - June 27, 1865
  - Southern Division of Louisiana, May 29, 1865 - June 27, 1865.

==== Pacific Theater ====
- Department of the Pacific - July 27, 1865 (Merged into the Military Division of the Pacific)
  - District of Arizona (headquarters at Prescott) March 7, 1865 - July 27, 1865
- Military Division of the Pacific July 27, 1865 - July 3, 1891
  - Department of California, 1865-1913
  - Department of the Columbia, 1865-1913
    - U.S. Forces, San Juan Island, 1865–72
