= Military Division of the Missouri =

Division of the United States Army

The Military Division of the Missouri was an administrative formation of the United States Army that functioned through the end of the American Civil War and the Indian Wars that continued after its conclusion. It was created by the War Department on February 3, 1865, at the direction of General Ulysses S. Grant to bring all the military departments west of the Mississippi River under a single commander.

== History ==
=== Background ===
Following the successful conclusion of the Mexican–American War, the administration of the United States Army was theoretically directed, under the President of the United States, by the Secretary of War and the general in chief. In practice the Secretary of War and the heads of the army's staff agencies—who reported directly to him (adjutant general, quartermaster general, commissary general, inspector general, paymaster general, surgeon general, chief engineer, colonel of topographical engineers, and colonel of ordnance)—exercised full authority, leaving the general-in-chief a figurehead. With a lack of central direction, policy and strategy were de facto developed by the commanders of the numbered geographical departments and three division headquarters. After October 31, 1853, the division echelon was eliminated and the six western departments consolidated into four (Departments of Texas, New Mexico, the West, and the Pacific), whose department commanders employed their troops as they saw fit. The system returned to six departments in 1858 when the Department of Utah was created in January, and the Department of the Pacific split into the Departments of California and Oregon in September.

Military activity affecting one department often originated in another department, preventing efficient use of limited manpower and coordination of efforts. Friction between the Secretaries of War and the generals in chief, and particularly between Jefferson Davis and Winfield Scott, obstructed reforms in the staff system that might have brought unity of command and civilian control of the military. The expansion of the army during the Civil War saw a proliferation in the numbers of geographic departments and their subordinate districts, often changing names and areas under their individual control, some departments eliminated or renamed, only to be recreated again in altered form.

=== Departments of the Missouri and Kansas ===
The Department of the Missouri resulted from the reorganization and breakup the Department of the West on November 9, 1861, after Abraham Lincoln fired John C. Frémont when he would not rescind his order emancipating the slaves of Missouri and imposing martial law on the state. David Hunter served briefly as the last commander Department of the West. The new department included Missouri, Arkansas, Illinois, Kentucky west of the Cumberland River and at times, Kansas. It briefly merged with the Department of Mississippi in 1862, but was recreated September 19, now consisting of Missouri, Arkansas, Kansas, and the Indian Territory. Colorado and Nebraska were added on October 11, 1862, and the department became generally known as the Department of the Missouri. From 1862 to 1865 the department was primarily concerned with fighting Confederates in Missouri and Arkansas.

The Department of Kansas was created for a third time on January 1, 1864, removing major areas from the military jurisdiction of the Department of the Missouri. The new commander of the Department of Kansas, Maj. Gen. Samuel R. Curtis, had two districts (Colorado and Nebraska) wholly involved in Indian warfare, but Curtis was absorbed with fighting Confederates in the Indian Territory and bushwhackers in Kansas, allowing his other districts, but particularly Colorado, complete autonomy. Governor John Evans and Colorado district commander Col. John M. Chivington took advantage of this lack of oversight to aggressively attack Cheyenne villages in April 1864, igniting a major Indian war in July. Curtis created a new district, the Upper Arkansas, to wage the war but he was wholly incapable of locating his opponents. In his other district, Nebraska, the warfare was even more intense, but the forces there too weak to deal with it.

== Division of the Missouri ==
=== Creation ===
In December 1864 the Division of the Missouri was created to oversee the operations and administration of the Department of the Missouri, the Department of the Northwest (created in 1862), and the Department of Arkansas. Grant had the division created to allow for the movement of troops by a single commander between geographical departments on the frontier in order to deal quickly with military contingencies without the time-consuming approval of the War Department. The new division also created a higher command with which Grant could reward Maj. Gen. John Pope for his handling of Indian conflicts in the Department of the Northwest; and to replace William Rosecrans in command of the Department of the Missouri and Curtis in command of the Department of Kansas, both of whom had found disfavor with Grant. Pope took command of the Division of the Missouri on February 3, 1865, at Fort Leavenworth, Kansas, with headquarters moving soon after to St. Louis.

Major General Grenville M. Dodge took command of the existing Department of the Missouri on December 9, 1864. The Department of the Missouri expanded to include the Dakota Territory (formerly in the Department of the Northwest) and Utah, then had the Department of Kansas merged into it on January 30, 1865. Curtis was reassigned to command the much smaller Department of the Northwest on February 17, 1865. Maj. Gen. Joseph J. Reynolds remained in command of the Department of Arkansas.

The Department of the Northwest through the remainder of the Civil War consisted of the Districts of Wisconsin (Brig. Gen. Thomas A. Davies), Minnesota (Brig-Gen. Henry H. Sibley) and Iowa (Brig-Gen Alfred Sully). The Department of the Missouri expanded to eight districts: five in Missouri (St. Louis, Rolla, Central Missouri, North Missouri, and Southwest Missouri) and three on the Indian frontier, the Districts of North Kansas (Brig-Gen. Robert B. Mitchell), Upper Arkansas (Brig-Gen James H. Ford), and The Plains (Brig-Gen Patrick E. Connor), the last a new district that combined Nebraska (East Sub-District), Utah (West Sub District), Colorado (South Sub-District), and the area now Wyoming (North Sub-District).

=== Post-war reorganization ===
On June 27, 1865, the War Department issued General Order No. 118, reorganizing the United States (including those states formerly making up the Confederacy) into five military divisions and 18 geographical departments. The Department of the Northwest ceased to exist and its districts were merged into the Department of the Missouri with Pope now in command at Fort Leavenworth. The Division of the Missouri became the Military Division of the Mississippi, commanded by Maj. Gen. William T. Sherman in St. Louis. In addition to the Department of the Missouri and the Department of Arkansas, the Division of the Mississippi included the new Department of the Ohio (Maj. Gen. E.O.C. Ord, Detroit). Soon after Sherman and his staff arrived in St. Louis, however, the title of the division reverted to the Military Division of the Missouri, and the territory east of the Mississippi River was removed from it. However, the Division of the Missouri still included all states and territories west of the Mississippi River, north of Texas, and east of Idaho, Nevada, and Arizona.

On July 28, 1866, Congress enacted the peacetime establishment of the United States Army and Sherman was promoted to lieutenant general. The Military Division of the Missouri was reorganized into four geographical departments: the Department of Arkansas; the Department of the Missouri (Colorado, Kansas, New Mexico, and the Indian Territory); the Department of the Platte (Iowa, Nebraska, and the Territories of Wyoming, Utah, and Idaho east of the 114th meridian; March 5, 1866), and the Department of Dakota (Minnesota and the Territories of Montana and Dakota; August 11, 1866). Arkansas was withdrawn from the division on March 11, 1867.

In February 1868 Sherman was assigned by President Andrew Johnson to command the proposed Military Division of the Atlantic as Johnson struggled with Radical Republicans over Reconstruction policy and attempted to remove Secretary of War Edwin Stanton from office. However Sherman, who did not want to serve in Washington, D.C., advised Johnson that he would resign rather than carry out the order, which was then rescinded. Sherman remained in command of the Division of the Missouri until Grant was elected president, at which point Sherman was promoted to general and assumed command of the Army of the United States, March 4, 1869. Philip H. Sheridan was promoted to lieutenant general and assigned to command the Division of the Missouri with headquarters at Chicago. Texas was readmitted to the Union in 1870, and together with the Indian Territory, became the Department of Texas as an addition to the Division of the Missouri.

== Commanders ==
- John Pope (February 4, 1865 to June 27, 1865)
- William Tecumseh Sherman (June 27, 1865 to March 4, 1869)
- Philip Sheridan (March 4, 1869 to November 1, 1883)
- John Schofield (1883–1886)
- Alfred Terry (1886–1888)
- George Crook (1888–1890)
- Nelson A. Miles (1890–1894)
