= Battle of St. Johns Bluff =

Battle of the American Civil War

Coordinates: 30.3852°N 81.4998°W

Battle of Saint John's Bluff
- Part of the American Civil War
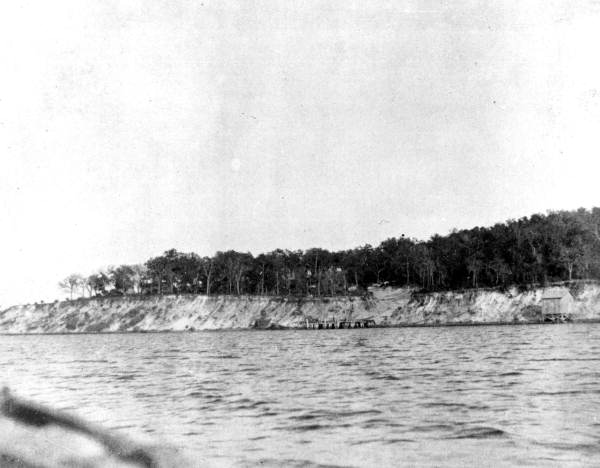
- St. Johns Bluff around 1900.
Date	October 1–3, 1862
Location	Duval County, Florida, now in Jacksonville
Result	Union victory Reoccupation of Jacksonville

Belligerents
United States (Union)	(Confederate States of America) CSA (Confederacy)

Commanders and leaders
John Milton Brannan	Charles F. Hopkins

Strength
1,573	1 artillery battery 1 cavalry company

Casualties and losses
None	None

The Battle of St. John's Bluff was fought from October 1–3, 1862, between Union and Confederate forces in Duval County, Florida, during the American Civil War. The battle resulted in a significant Union victory, helping secure their control of the Jacksonville area.

== History ==
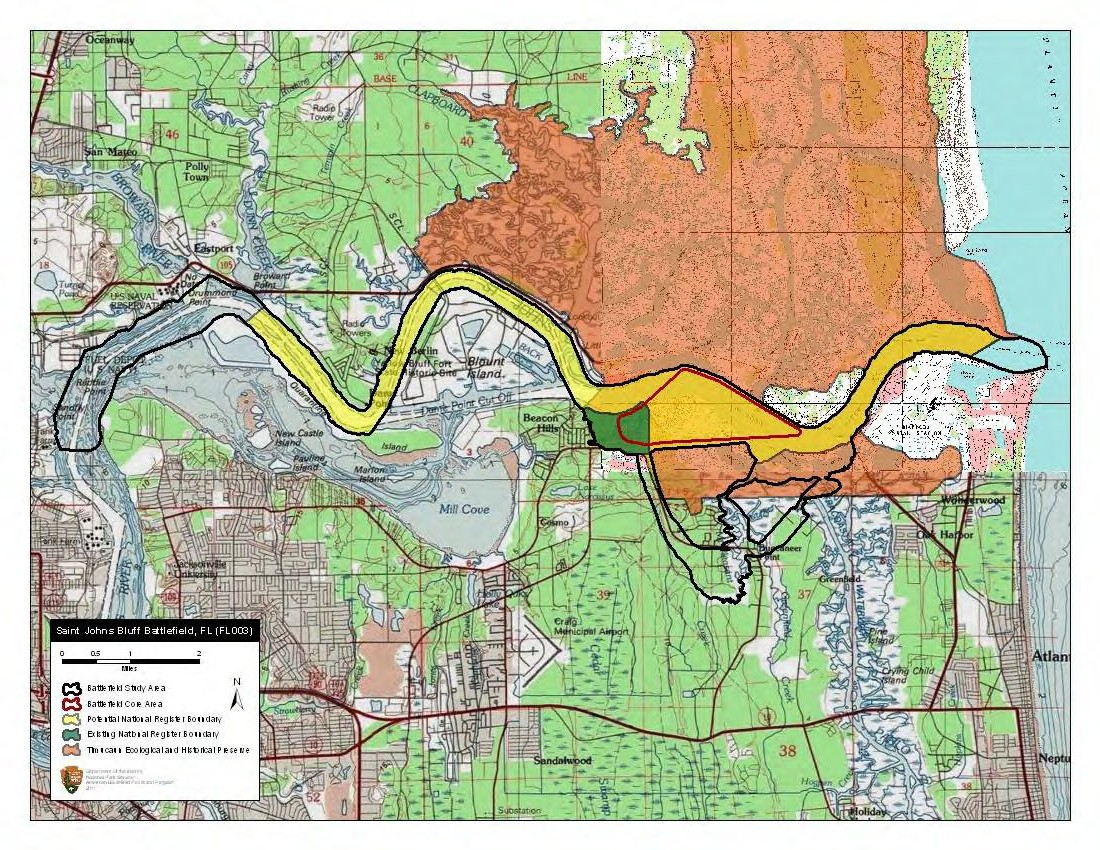
Map of Saint John's Bluff Battlefield core and study areas by the American Battlefield Protection Program.

The St. Johns River was important in the Union effort of taking Florida. If Federals controlled the St. Johns River then they could raid Confederate positions in the interior of Florida and also use the river as a barrier for control of the east. The Union wanted to control North Florida and use it as a haven for escaped slaves and use its position to initiate Reconstruction for Florida. Federals first occupied Jacksonville, Florida in March 1862. Federal gunboats stationed at Mayport Mills operated up and down the river.

Early in the war, in order to stop the movement of Union Navy ships up the St. Johns River, Confederate Brigadier General Joseph Finnegan established an artillery battery on St. Johns Bluff, on the south side of the river 18 miles downstream from Jacksonville, Florida. The Union victories at Fort Donelson and Fort Henry forced Florida Confederates to go to Tennessee to reinforce the Confederate Army. With few resources Finnegan managed to fortify St. Johns Bluff where Confederate troops used slave labor to construct defenses. This was part of a series of Confederate defensive works that had been constructed near Fort Caroline and Yellow Bluff Fort.

On September 11 Confederates opened fire on Union gunboat USS Uncas approaching the bluff. The USS Patroon joined the USS Uncas and opened fire on the bluff but failed to destroy the Confederate position. The Union dispatched over 800 soldiers to Florida from South Carolina to take the bluff expecting it to be a challenging obstacle. Union reinforcements arrived on October 1 at Mayport Mills. According to Brigadier General John Milton Brannan, the leader of the Union's expeditionary force, "On the 1st instant the gunboats made a reconnaissance on the river, and were immediately and warmly engaged by the batteries on Saint John’s Bluff, on which they withdrew." Among the Union Army regiments participating in this engagement was the 47th Pennsylvania Infantry Regiment, which landed on the bank of Buckhorn Creek at 7 a.m. on October 1 and marched toward "Parker's plantation," according to Colonel Tilghman H. Good, the regiment's commanding officer.

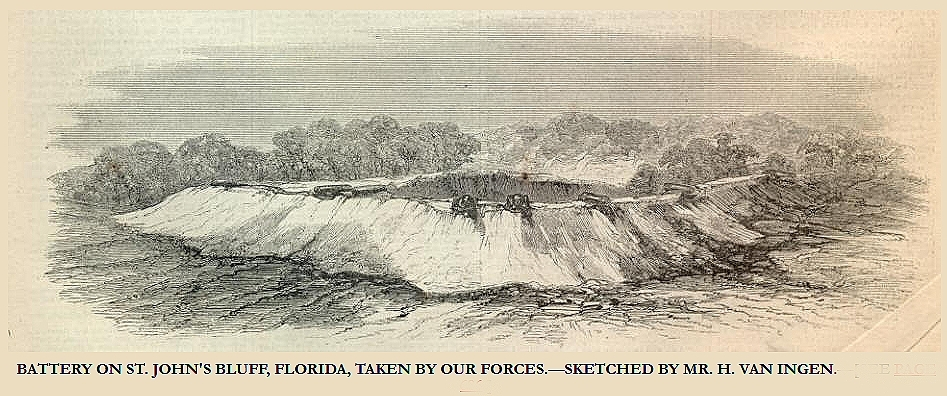
Confederate battery on St. John's Bluff, by Henry Van Ingen, Harper's Weekly, October 25, 1862

The next day, Union soldiers under Brannan approached the bluff from the rear. Brannan later reported that, on October 2, "a scouting party of the Forty-seventh Regiment Pennsylvania Volunteers, under Captain Keck, of that regiment, surprised a camp of the rebels, taking some camp equipage and about sixty stand of arms of all descriptions, but chiefly rifles. The men effected their escape, having horses and being much favored by the intricate nature of the ground."

Reportedly, Confederate Colonel Charles F. Hopkins was panicked by Union reinforcements approaching from the rear and Union gunboats firing on the bluff while Captain Winston Stephens believed the Confederate position could hold off the Federal assault. After Hopkins decided to order a retreat from the Confederate position on October 2–3, Union troops occupied the Confederate position and seized the cannons. Two days later, on October 5, the Federals moved on to nearby Yellow Bluff Fort, where Confederate troops had also retreated.

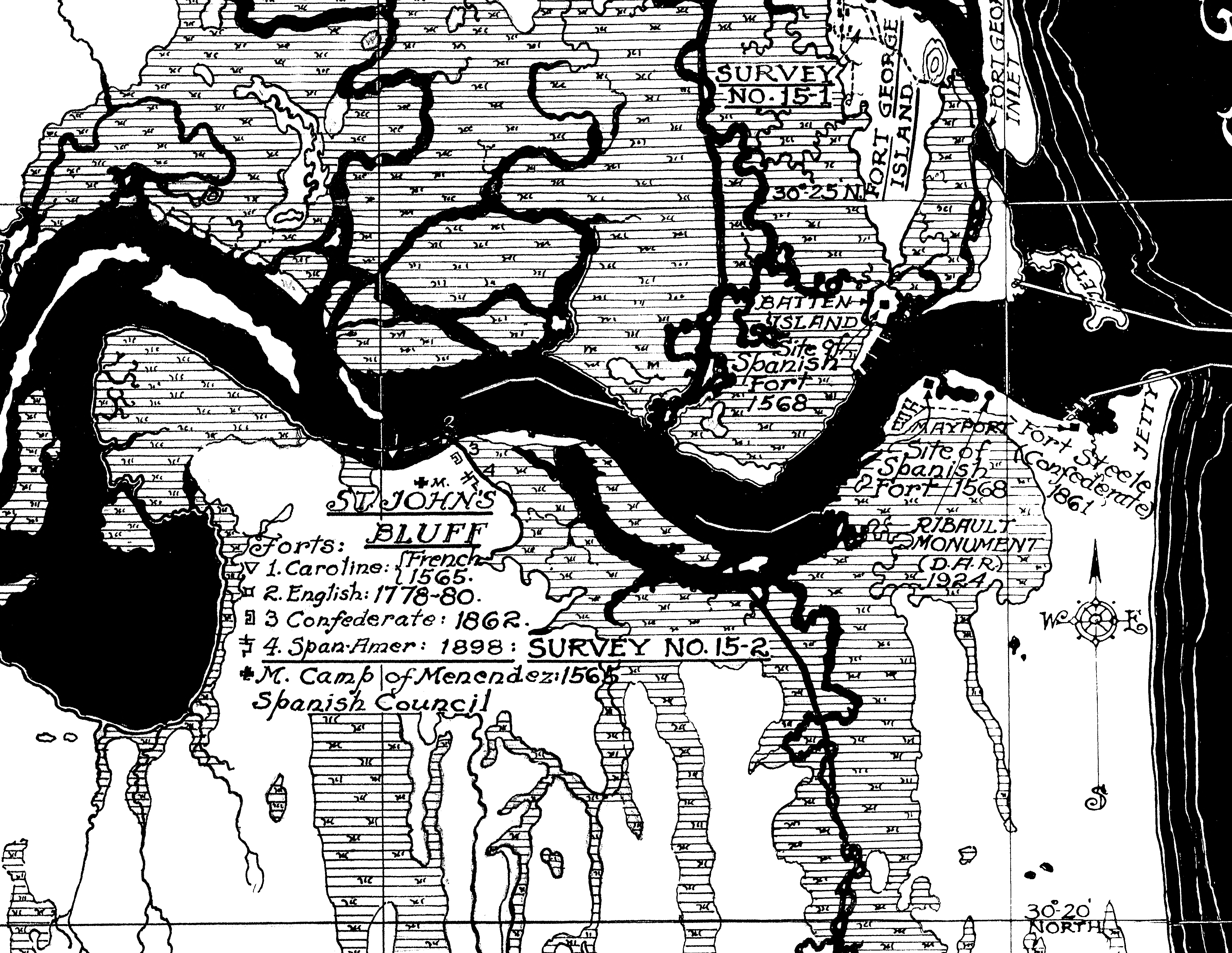
Map of St. John's Bluff

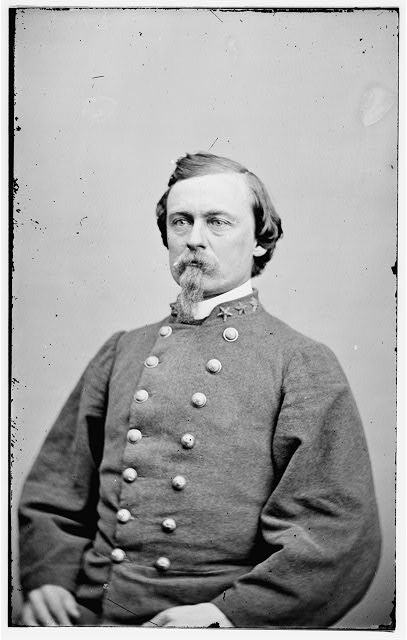
Brigadier General Joseph Finnegan

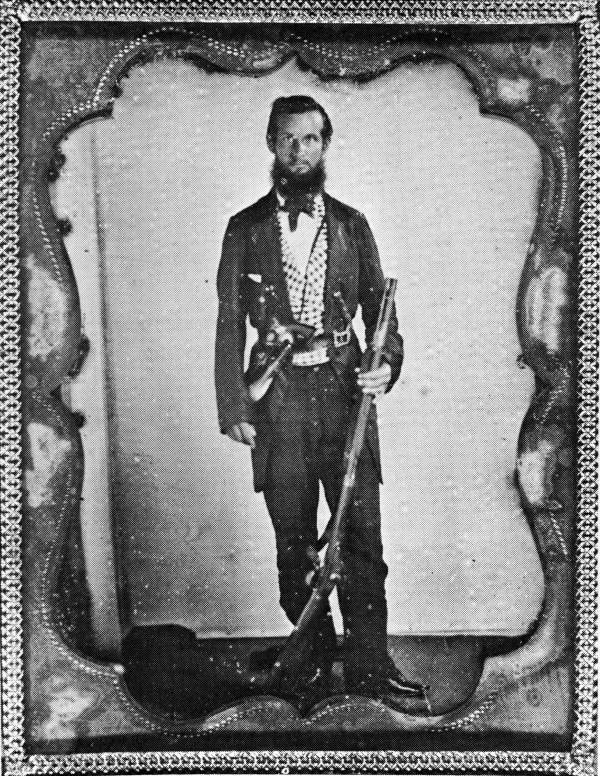
Confederate Captain Winston Stephens

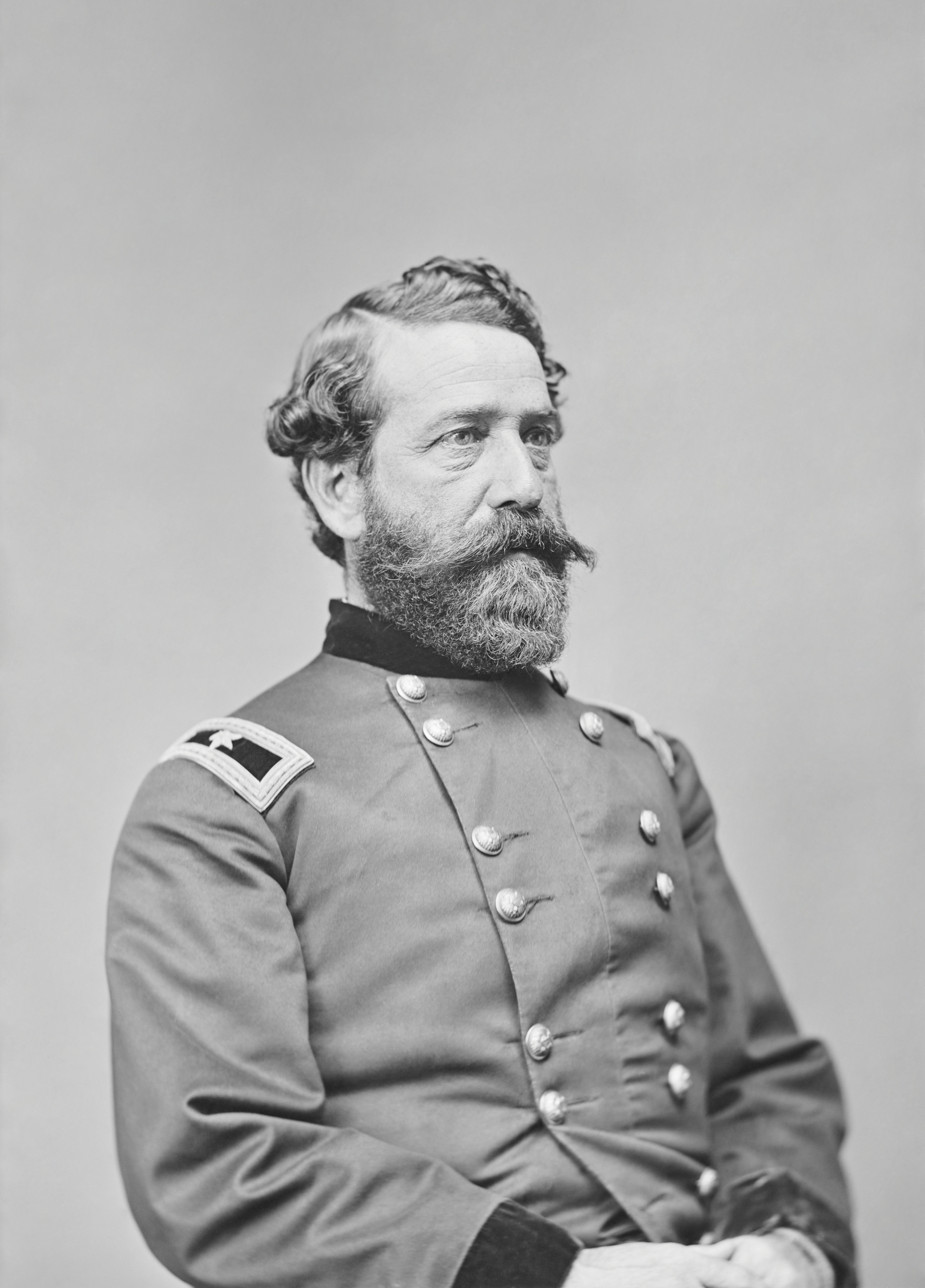
Brigadier General John M. Brannan

== Aftermath ==
Jacksonville was reoccupied on October 3 after the Union victory at St. Johns Bluff. Finnegan believed that Hopkins' retreat from St. Johns Bluff was a "gross military blunder" but Hopkins still defended his position for retreating. The Confederate threat in North Florida no longer prevented Federals from seizing the St. Johns River and Jacksonville.

== See also ==
- Florida in the American Civil War
