= John S. Mason =

John Sanford Mason
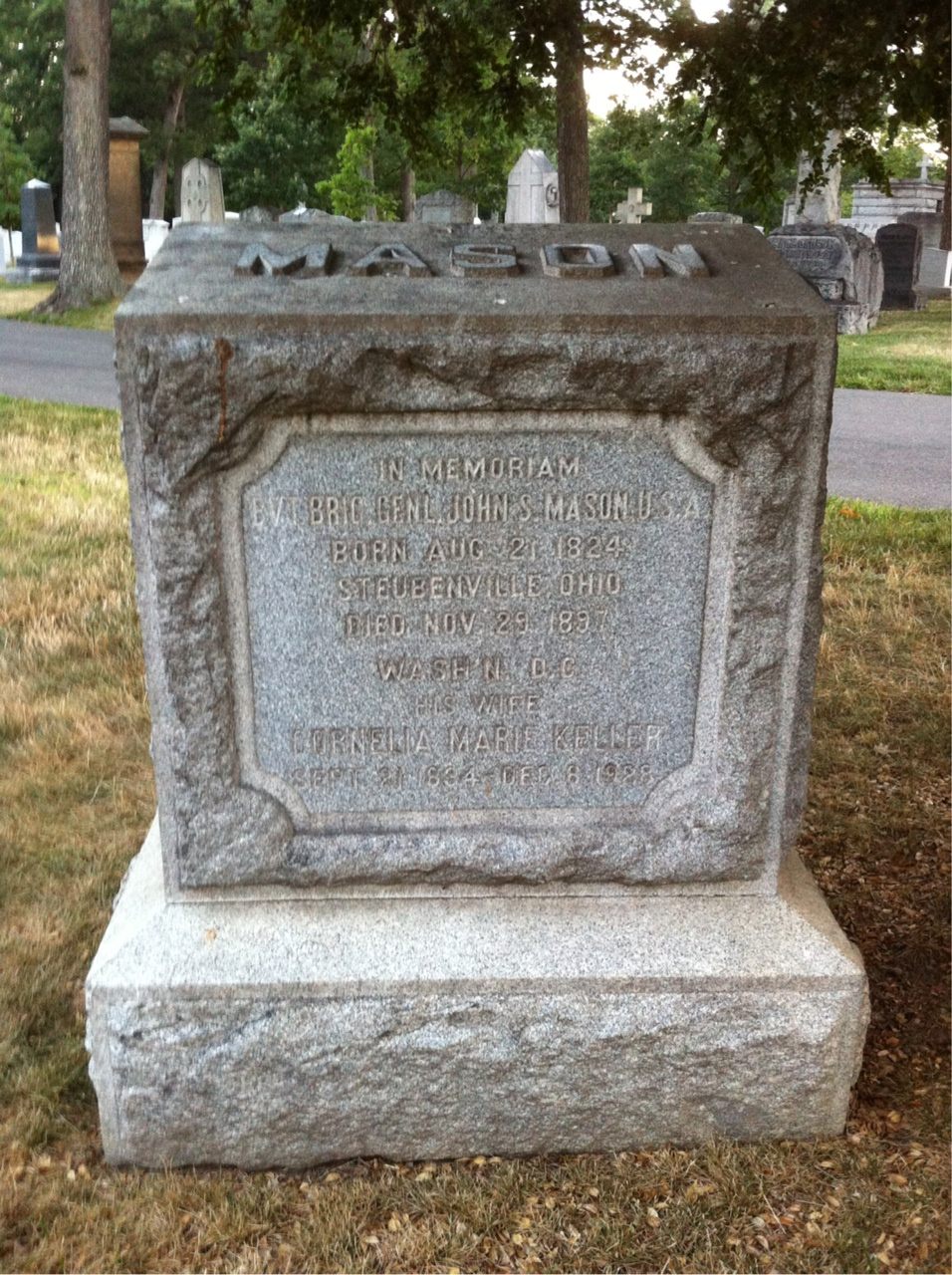
- Grave at Arlington National Cemetery
- Born: August 21, 1824; Steubenville, Ohio, US
- Died: November 29, 1897 (aged 73); Washington, D.C., US
- Burial place: Arlington National Cemetery
- Relatives: cousin of Lucretia Garfield
- Military career
- Allegiance: United States; Union
- Branch: United States Army; Union Army
- Service years: 1847–1888
- Rank: Brigadier General
- Commands: 4th Ohio Infantry; 9th Infantry Regiment
- Conflicts: Mexican-American War American Civil War: Operations in Western Virginia; Peninsula Campaign; Battle of Antietam; Battle of Fredericksburg; Indian Wars

John Sanford Mason (August 21, 1824 – November 29, 1897) was a career officer in the United States Army who served in the Indian Wars, Mexican-American War, and as a general in the Union Army during the American Civil War.

== Early life and career ==
John S. Mason was born in Steubenville, Ohio, in the late summer of 1824. His father was a prominent physician who had been a military surgeon during the War of 1812. He was educated in the local schools began his college studies at Kenyon College in Gambier. In the winter of 1842, he transferred to Washington College in Pennsylvania. However, he withdrew when he received an appointment to the United States Military Academy in West Point, New York, on July 1, 1843. He graduated 9th of 38 cadets in the Class of 1847 and was commissioned as a second lieutenant in the 3rd U. S. Artillery. Among his classmates were future Civil War generals A.P. Hill, Henry Heth, John Gibbon, and Ambrose Burnside.

With the Mexican War raging, he was assigned to garrison duty at Tampico, Mexico, where he contracted yellow fever. After spending time in Cincinnati, Ohio, recovering, he returned to Mexico to Puebla as a commissary officer. He survived a second severe bout with yellow fever in New Orleans at the end of the war. He later served in a variety of posts, including Fort Adams in Newport, Rhode Island, Fort Yuma, several garrisons in California, and finally at Fort Vancouver in the Washington Territory. He was a quartermaster from June 1854 until June 1858, and was promoted to first lieutenant in September 1860.

== Civil War ==
Lieutenant Mason was still at Fort Vancouver when news arrived in April 1861 of the outbreak of the Civil War and the bombardment of Fort Sumter in Charleston, South Carolina. After the departure of Edward O. C. Ord, Mason assumed the role of post commander at Fort Vancouver on May 7, 1861, and remained in that position until June 11, when relieved following the arrival of Capt. Henry K. Black of the 9th U.S. Infantry. . Later in May, he was promoted to a captaincy in the 11th U.S. Infantry. In October of that year, he was appointed as the colonel of the three-years' 4th Ohio Infantry. He joined 4th OVI in western Virginia, where they served during the fall and winter under command of Maj. Gen. James Shields.

In 1862, Mason's regiment participated in the Peninsula Campaign of Maj. Gen. George B. McClellan, where they guarded Harrison's Landing. He was involved in the Maryland Campaign and the Battle of Antietam. Late in the year, he commanded a brigade in Maj. Gen. John Sedgwick's II Corps' "Right Grand Division" and fought at the Battle of Fredericksburg. He was cited for gallantry in both of those actions and brevetted. On November 29, 1862, he was promoted to the rank of brigadier general of U. S. Volunteers.

His health, never robust following the two yellow fever bouts, again failed him and Mason asked for and received administrative duty. In April 1863, Mason was assigned to muster and recruit duty, first in Ohio (where he also commanded Camp Thomas for more than a year), and for the last two years of the war in California as an Adjutant General, and finally in the new state of Nevada. He was promoted to Major of the 17th U.S. Infantry in the Regular Army in 1864.

Mason was responsible for John Hunt Morgan and his raiders imprisoned in Columbus, OH at the time that seven escaped.

From March 7, 1865 - July 21, 1865 he was commander of the District of Arizona under the Department of the Pacific. In the omnibus promotions at the end of the Civil War in 1865, he was brevetted through the Regular Army grades to that of brigadier general.

== Postbellum career ==
Mason remained in the U.S. Army following the war (reverting to his Regular Army rank of major and transferring to the 35th U.S. Infantry in September 1866 as commander of the new District of Arizona). He subsequently performed garrison duty in a number of outposts on Western frontier in the 1870s and the 1880s. He was transferred to the 15th U.S. Infantry in March 1869. He was promoted to lieutenant colonel of the 4th U.S. Infantry in 1873 and to colonel of the 9th U.S. Infantry in 1883. His stations included the states and territories of Texas, New Mexico, Wyoming, Washington, D.C., Ohio, and Arizona. Mason was a cousin of President James A. Garfield’s wife Lucretia and during the Garfield administration was Deputy Governor of the Soldiers Home at Washington. He was married twice, first to Anna Worrell Judkins and then to Cornelia (Keller) Wilson.

Mason was active in veterans affairs, particularly in the Military Order of the Loyal Legion of the United States. He retired in 1888 as the colonel of the 9th U.S. Infantry at Fort Whipple, Arizona, and took up residence in Washington, D.C., where he died at home on November 29, 1897, from general paralysis brought about from a stroke. He was buried in Section 1, Grave 541, of Arlington National Cemetery.

One of his sons, Captain John S. Mason Jr., perished at the army post at the Pine Ridge Indian Reservation from exposure in the line of duty, and is also buried at Arlington National Cemetery. Another son, Charles, also served in the Army.

== See also ==
- List of American Civil War generals (Union)
