= District of Arizona =

Subordinate district of the Department of New Mexico territory

District of Arizona was a subordinate district of the Department of New Mexico territory created on August 30, 1862 and transferred to the Department of the Pacific in March 1865.

== District of Arizona (Dept. of New Mexico) commanders ==
Headquarters at Franklin, Texas, then Mesilla Post until 1864.

- James H. Carleton – August 30, 1862 – September 5, 1862
- Joseph R. West – September 5, 1862 – January 29, 1864
- George W. Bowie – January 29, 1864 – November 1864
- Joseph R. Smith – November 1864 – December 8, 1864

== District of Arizona (Dept. of the Pacific) commanders ==
Headquarters Prescott, Arizona

- John S. Mason – March 7, 1865 – July 27, 1865

On July 27, 1865 the Military Division of the Pacific was created under Major General Henry W. Halleck, replacing the Department of the Pacific, consisting of the Department of the Columbia and the expanded Department of California, that absorbed the District of Southern California and that consisted of the States of California and Nevada and the District of New Mexico in the Territory of New Mexico and District of Arizona in the Territory of Arizona.

Arizona remained a district until it became the Department of Arizona under the Military Division of the Pacific on April 15, 1870. Colonel George Stoneman transitioned from district to department commander, serving until June 4, 1871. The new department consisted of Arizona Territory and California south of a line from the northwest corner of Arizona to Point Conception so as to include most of Southern California.

== District of Arizona (Military Division of the Pacific) commanders ==
- Major John S. Mason – March 7, 1865 – April 30, 1866
- Lt. Col. Henry D. Wallen – June 10 – August 11, 1866
- Colonel Charles S. Lovell – August 11, 1866 – October 12, 1867
- Colonel Thomas L. Crittenden – October 12, 1867 – August 29, 1868
- Colonel Thomas C. Devin – August 29, 1868 – August 16, 1869
- Colonel George Stoneman – August 16, 1869 – May 3, 1870

== Posts ==
- Fort Buchanan – 1856–1861, 1862
- Fort Breckenridge – 1857–1861, Fort Stanford 1862, Camp Wright 1865, Camp Grant – 1865–1873
- Fort Mojave – 1858–1861, 1863–1890
- Fort Tucson – 1860–1862
  - Tucson Armory – 1862–1864
- Fort Barrett – 1862
- Fort Bowie – 1862–1894
- Mission Camp, near Nogales – 1862
- Fort Tubac – 1862–1865, 1866–1868
- Camp La Paz – September 1863 – 1864, sub post of Fort Mohave between Olive City and La Paz, Arizona.
- Camp at Bear Spring – 1863–1864
- Fort Cerro – 1863 – ?
- Fort Canby – 1863–1864
- Camp Clark – 1863–1864, renamed Fort Whipple – 1864–1869
- Camp Pomeroy – 1863
- Camp on the Colorado River, Camp Colorado – 1864–1871, near Parker
- Fort Verde – 1864–1866
- Yuma Depot – 1864–1891
- Post at Calabasas 1865, Fort Mason – 1865–1866, Camp McKee 1866 in Rio Rico, Arizona
- Camp Cameron – 1866–1867, in Madera Canyon
- Camp Alexander – 1867, 12 miles up river from Fort Mohave at a crossing on the Colorado River.
- Camp Willow Grove – 1867–1869, south of Valentine
- Camp Devin, renamed Camp Toll Gate until 1870, Camp Hualpai – 1869–1873, near Paulden

== See also ==
- California in the American Civil War
- New Mexico Territory in the American Civil War
- Arizona Territory in the American Civil War
