= Persifor Frazer Smith =

American military officer (1798–1858)

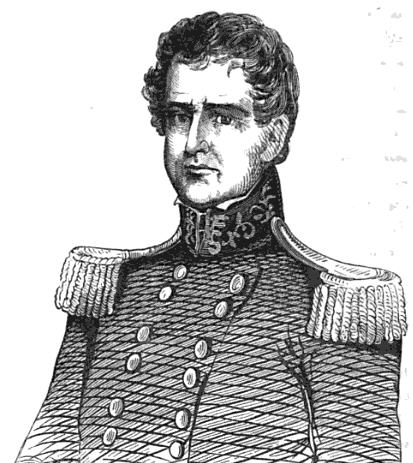

6th Military Governor of California
- In office February 28, 1849 – April 12, 1849
- Preceded by: Richard Barnes Mason
- Succeeded by: Bennet C. Riley

Personal details
- Born: November 16, 1798 Philadelphia, Pennsylvania, U.S.
- Died: May 17, 1858 (aged 59) Leavenworth, Kansas, U.S.
- Resting place: Laurel Hill Cemetery, Philadelphia, Pennsylvania, U.S.
- Spouses: Frances Jeanette Bureau (m. 1822; died 1852) Anne Monica Millard Armstrong (m. 1854)
- Children: Howard Smith (first marriage)
- Profession: Soldier

Military service
- Allegiance: United States of America
- Branch/service: United States Army
- Years of service: 1836–1838; 1846–1858
- Rank: Brigadier General; Bvt. Major General
- Commands: U.S. Regiment of Mounted Riflemen; P.F. Smith's Brigade; Pacific Division; Department of Texas; Department of the West
- Battles/wars: Second Seminole War; Mexican–American War; Battle of Monterrey; Siege of Veracruz; Battle of Cerro Gordo; Battle of Contreras; Battle for Mexico City; Bleeding Kansas

Persifor Frazer Smith (November 16, 1798 – May 17, 1858) was an American military officer. He served as an officer in the Louisiana State militia and as Louisiana State adjutant general. He led two regiments of Louisiana and Pennsylvania volunteers during the Second Seminole War. He served as a colonel in the United States Army during the Mexican–American War, was brevetted to major general, and became known as the "hero of Contreras". He commanded the Pacific Division from 1848 to 1849 including as the 6th Military governor of California from February to April 1849. He commanded the Department of Texas from 1850 to 1856 and the Department of the West from 1856 to 1858 during the Bleeding Kansas conflict. In 1858, he was appointed commander of the Department of Utah with orders to quell the Mormon Rebellion, but died at Fort Leavenworth before he could take command.

== Early life and education ==
Smith was born on November 16, 1798, in Philadelphia, Pennsylvania, to Jonathan and Mary Ann (Frazer) Smith. His maternal grandfather was Persifor Frazer, an army officer in the American Revolutionary War. In 1815, he graduated from the College of New Jersey (now known as Princeton University) and studied law.

== Career ==
In 1819, he moved to New Orleans, Louisiana, built a successful law practice and served in several elected offices. He was active in local militia activities and put in charge of a company and a battalion of Louisiana militia. After his political ally, Edward D. White Sr. was elected governor, Smith was appointed state adjutant general. On February 2, 1836, he was elected colonel of a Louisiana volunteer regiment that served in the second Seminole War from 1836 to 1838. His service impressed Generals Winfield Scott and Zachary Taylor and he remained in Florida and led a Pennsylvania volunteer regiment after the Louisiana volunteers returned home. After the war, he served as a judge in Lafayette, Louisiana, and Jefferson Parish.

At the onset of the Mexican–American War, he was made brigadier general of Louisiana volunteers on May 15, 1846, and accepted a commission as colonel in the United States Army on May 27, 1846. He commanded a brigade in Zachary Taylor's forces during the Battle of Monterrey. He was brevetted brigadier general on September 23, 1846, and joined Winfield Scott's army as commander of the newly created Regiment of Mounted Riflemen. He led his brigade at the battles of Veracruz, Cerro Gordo, and Contreras. He was brevetted major general for actions at Contreras and became knowns as "the hero of Contreras". He fought in the Battle for Mexico City and served on the armistice commission and as military governor of Mexico City. He was an original member of the Aztec Club of 1847 and served as president from 1848 to 1851.

After the war, Smith commanded the Pacific Division from 1848 to 1849 including as the 6th military governor of California from February to April 1849. He sent relief parties across the Sierra Nevada in the fall of 1849 to meet the last arrivals in the emigration, saving many lives.

Smith commanded the Department of Texas from 1850 to 1856. He established a series of forts to prevent raids from native Americans. He selected the site for Fort Davis and issued orders for the establishment of Fort Lancaster. In 1856, Smith was appointed commander of the Department of the West. He served during the Bleeding Kansas conflict and organized multiple sortees of soldiers from Fort Leavenworth to reduce the violence between pro-slavery and abolitionist groups.

He was promoted to brigadier general on December 30, 1856 and was appointed to command the Department of Utah to suppress the Mormon uprising but never took command. He died on May 17, 1858, at Fort Leavenworth, of dysentery. He was interred at Laurel Hill Cemetery in Philadelphia.

== Personal life ==
His maternal grandfather was Revolutionary War figure Persifor Frazer. Smith's cousin, also named Persifor Frazer Smith, was a lawyer in Philadelphia and a member of the Pennsylvania House of Representatives.

Smith married his first wife, Frances Jeanette Bureau, in 1822. Their only child, Howard Smith, became a physician and surgeon. After his first wife died in 1852, Smith married Anne Monica Millard Armstrong, mother of Confederate Army general Frank Crawford Armstrong.
