= Carlos Waite =

American general

Carlos Adolphus Waite (May 5, 1797 – May 7, 1866) was a career soldier in the United States Army who, in his retirement, received the brevet rank of Brigadier General.

== Biography ==
Carlos A. Waite was born in Plattsburgh, New York, on May 5, 1797. He entered the U.S. Army as 3rd lieutenant of infantry, 28 January 1820, became 1st lieutenant, 1 May 1828, and captain, 3 July 1836. From July 7, 1838, to May 8, 1845, he served as captain and assistant quartermaster. He was appointed major of the 8th U.S. Infantry, 16 February 1847, and served in the Mexican–American War, receiving the brevets of lieutenant colonel, 20 August 1847, for gallant and meritorious conduct at Contreras and Churubusco, and colonel, 8 September 1847, for gallant and meritorious conduct at Molino del Rey, where he was severely wounded. He was made lieutenant colonel of the 5th U.S. Infantry on 10 November 1851, and colonel of the 1st U.S. Infantry on 5 June 1860. On 19 February 1861, Waite superseded Brevet Major General David E. Twiggs as commander of the Department of Texas as Twiggs surrendered the department to the Confederates in the beginning of what would become the American Civil War (Twiggs would eventually be commissioned into the Confederate States Army). Waite commanded the department until it was officially abolished later in 1861. After returning east, he commanded the military post at Annapolis, Maryland. In 1864, he was placed on the retired list, owing to impaired health, and he resided in Plattsburgh until his death. After the war, he was brevetted Brigadier General, backdated to 13 March 1865, for long and faithful service in the U.S. Army; however, the confirmation wasn't issued before his death. Waite died in Plattsburgh on May 7, 1866.

== See also ==
- List of American Civil War brevet generals (Union)
