= Department of Key West =

Department of Key West, was a military department of the Union Army created in February 1862 from the Department of Florida. It had command over the posts that were newly captured by “Expeditionary Corps” combined of Army and Navy units under Brigadier General Thomas W. Sherman and Flag Officer Samuel Francis Du Pont. These were posts at Fernandina, St. Augustine and the forces investing Fort Pulaski and blockading the Savannah River on Tybee Island at the mouth of the river.

This department was merged into the Department of the South on March 15, 1862, before the capture of Fort Pulaski on April 11, 1862.

== Commander ==
- Brigadier General J. M. Brannan, February 21, 1862, to March 15, 1862.

== Posts of the Department of Key West ==
- Fernandina, Florida March 3, 1862 - March 15, 1862
  - Fort Clinch
- St. Augustine, Florida March 11, 1862 - March 15, 1862
  - Fort Marion March 11, 1862 - March 15, 1862
- Tybee Island, Georgia near Fort Pulaski Nov. 1861 - March 15, 1862
