= Department of Arizona =

Military department of the US Army

The Department of Arizona was a military department of the United States Army that existed from 1870 to 1893. It was subordinate to the Military Division of the Pacific and comprised posts in Arizona and Southern California. It was the successor to the District of Arizona within the Department of California. From 1870 to 1886, Fort Whipple, Arizona was the department's headquarters. Afterwards it was headquartered at Drum Barracks in Wilmington, California.

== Commanders ==
- Colonel George Stoneman, May 3, 1870, to June 4, 1871
- Lieutenant Colonel George Crook, June 4, 1871, to Mar. 22, 1875
- Major General August Kautz, Mar. 22, 1875 - Mar. 5, 1878
- Brigadier General Orlando B. Willcox, Mar. 5, 1878, to September 4, 1882
- Brigadier General George Crook, September 4, 1882 to April 11, 1886
- Brigadier General Nelson A. Miles, April 11, 1886 - November 26, 1888
- Colonel Benjamin Grierson November 26, 1888 - September 16, 1890
- Brigadier General Alexander McDowell McCook, September 16, 1890 to July 6, 1893

== Posts ==
- Fort Breckenridge 1857–1861, Fort Stanford 1862, Camp Wright 1865, Camp Grant 1865-1873
- Fort Mojave 1858–1861, 1863–1890
- Fort Bowie 1862–1894
- Fort Cerro 1863 - ?
- Fort Whipple, Arizona 1864-1913
- Camp on the Colorado River, Camp Colorado 1864 - 1871, near Parker
- Yuma Depot 1864 - 1891
- Camp Devin, renamed Camp Toll Gate until 1870, Camp Hualpai, 1869 - 1873, near Paulden
