= Eastern Division (United States Army) =

Eastern Division of the United States Army was one of its superior administrative organizations that existed during the mid-19th century and for a short time in the early 20th century.

== Eastern Division 1837 - 42 ==
Eastern Division of the U. S. Army was first created 1837, as the Army reorganized its administration. It had a subordinate 7th Military Department until 1841, and it was eliminated in 1842.

== Renewed Eastern Division 1844 - 53 ==
The Eastern Division was restored in 1844 with subordinate 5th Military Department until 1848 and the 8th Military Department until 1846.

From 1848 to 1853 the Eastern Division had 4 subordinate departments.

- 1st Military Department, 1848–53; consolidated 1st and 3d Military Departments, 1849–50
- 2nd Military Department, 1848–51; consolidated 1st and 2d Military Departments, 1848–49
- 3rd Military Departments, 1848, 1850–53
- 4th Military Departments, 1848–53; consolidated 3d and 4th Military Departments, 1848

In 1853, the Eastern Division was replaced, along with the whole division echelon, in favor of territorial Departments. The Department of the East absorbed the four numerated departments (1st-4th) of the Eastern Division, with boundaries encompassing all the states east of the Mississippi River.

== Renewed Eastern Division 1911 - 13 ==
The departments were again organized under new divisions in 1911, with the Eastern Division having the subordinate Department of the East and Department of the Gulf. In 1913, the “Stimson Plan” again eliminated the division administrative echelon. The Eastern Department and Southern Department absorbed most of the Eastern Division.

== See also ==
- Western Division (United States Army)
- Pacific Division (United States Army)
