= Department of the Rappahannock =

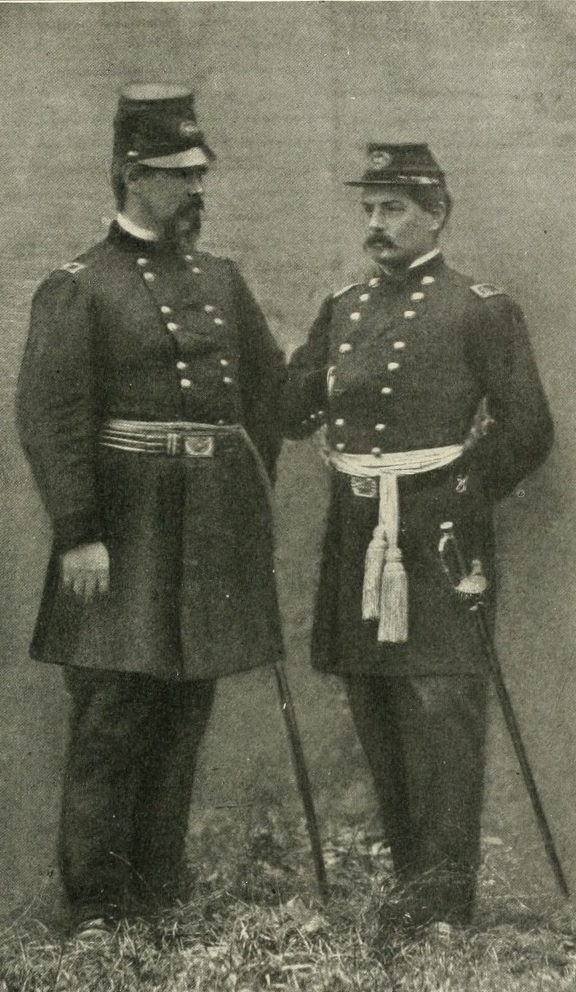
Brigadier General Irvin McDowell (left) with Major General George B. McClellan

The Department of the Rappahannock was a department of the Union Army in the Eastern Theater of the American Civil War that existed from April 4, 1862 to September 12, 1862.

On April 4, 1862, President Lincoln created the Department of the Rappahannock from the larger Department of the Potomac., The I Corps from the Army of the Potomac was detached to form the basis of the new department. Its territory consisted of Virginia “east of the Blue Ridge and west of the Potomac River, the Fredericksburg and Richmond Railroad, including the District of Columbia and the country between the Potomac and the Patuxent Rivers.” The commander of the I Corps, Irvin McDowell, was promoted to Major General and authorized to command the department. Northeastern Virginia was added to the department on June 1, 1862. The Department of the Shenandoah absorbed the Piedmont District and Bull Mountain Range on June 1, 1862. The District of Columbia became the Department of Washington on June 26, 1862.

On June 9, 1862, the department took part in its only engagement of the war, the Battle of Port Republic, during Jackson's Valley Campaign. Two brigades from the division of James Shields, commanded by Erastus B. Tyler, were outnumbered and defeated by forces led by Confederate Major General Stonewall Jackson. The federals lost 1,002 men, while the confederates lost 816. It was Jackson’s costliest battle of the campaign, but was both a tactical and strategic victory for the Confederates as it freed Jackson’s army to reinforce Robert E. Lee in the Seven Days Battles.

From June 26, 1862 to September 12, 1862, the troops of the Department of the Rappahannock were designated the III Corps of the Army of Virginia. On September 12, 1862, the III Corps became the I Corps of the Army of the Potomac. Brigadier General James B. Ricketts commanded III Corps on September 5–6, 1862. III Corps, then I Corps, was commanded by Major General Joseph Hooker from September 6, 1862 to September 17, 1862.
