= Department of Florida =

Union Army department, 1861 to 1862

Department of Florida, was the military administrative department established by the Union Army. The Department of Florida was established on April 13, 1861, to defend and administer the few remaining Federal installations remaining in Florida. Following the secession of Florida in January 1861, Florida troops seized most Federal property in the state with the exceptions of Fort Zachary Taylor at Key West and Fort Pickens at Pensacola. The Union Navy would use the port of Key West to establish a blockade of the Atlantic and Eastern Gulf coasts of the Confederacy, with the South Atlantic Blockading Squadron and the East Gulf Blockading Squadron.

On January 11, 1862, Key West and the coastline from Cape Canaveral to the Apalachicola River were detached from the Dept of Florida to form the Department of Key West under command of Brig. Gen. John M. Brannan, U.S. Army.

On March 15, 1862, the Department of Florida was merged into the Department of the South.

== Commanders ==
- Brevet Col. U.S. Army, Harvey Brown, April 13, 1861 - February 22, 1862.
- Brigadier General, L. G. Arnold, February 22. 1862 - March 15, 1862.

== Posts ==
- Post at Fort Pickens, FL, 1861-March 15, 1862
- Post at Fort Taylor, FL, 1861-January 11, 1862

== Department of Florida (1865-66) ==
At the end of the Civil War, a new Department of Florida, subordinate to the Military Division of the Gulf, (1865–66) was established by the United States Army on June 27, 1865. It remained until 1866 when it was merged into the Department of the Gulf, (1866–67).
