= Yellow Bluff Fort Historic State Park =

State park in Florida, United States

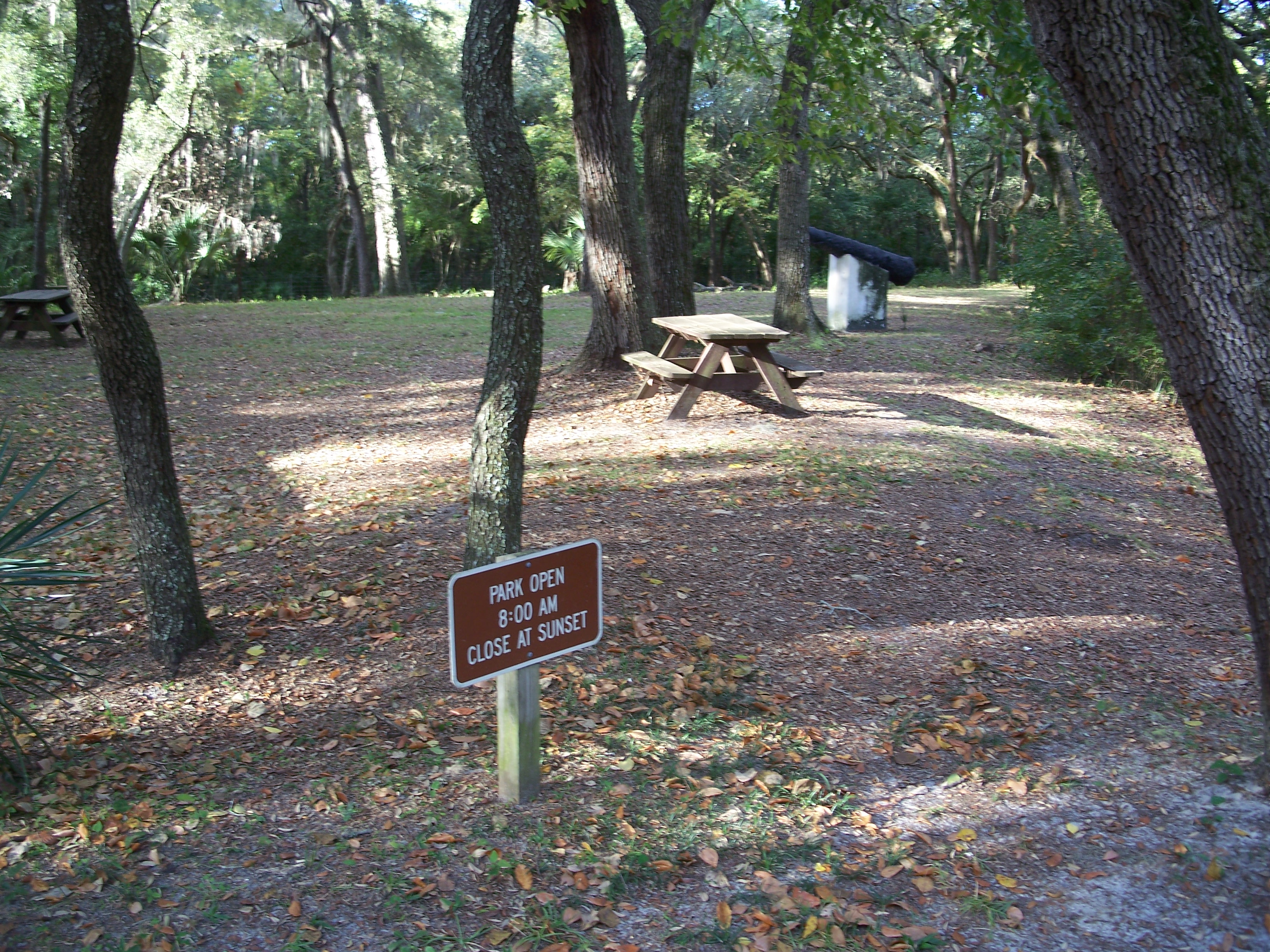
- Interactive map of Yellow Bluff Fort Historic State Park
- Location: Duval County, Florida, United States
- Nearest city: Jacksonville, Florida
- Established: September 29, 1970
- Governing body: Florida Department of Environmental Protection
- Yellow Bluff Fort
- U.S. National Register of Historic Places
- Location within Florida Location within the United States
- Nearest city: Jacksonville, Florida
- Coordinates: 30°23′58″N 81°33′22″W
- Area: 2 ha (4.9 acres)
- Built: 1862
- Architect: Confederate Army
- NRHP reference No.: 70000183
- Added to NRHP: September 29, 1970

Yellow Bluff Fort Historic State Park is a Florida State Park in Jacksonville, Florida. It is located near the mouth of the St. Johns River, a mile south of State Road 105 on New Berlin Road, in the cities Northside area. On September 29, 1970, it was added to the U.S. National Register of Historic Places.

== History ==
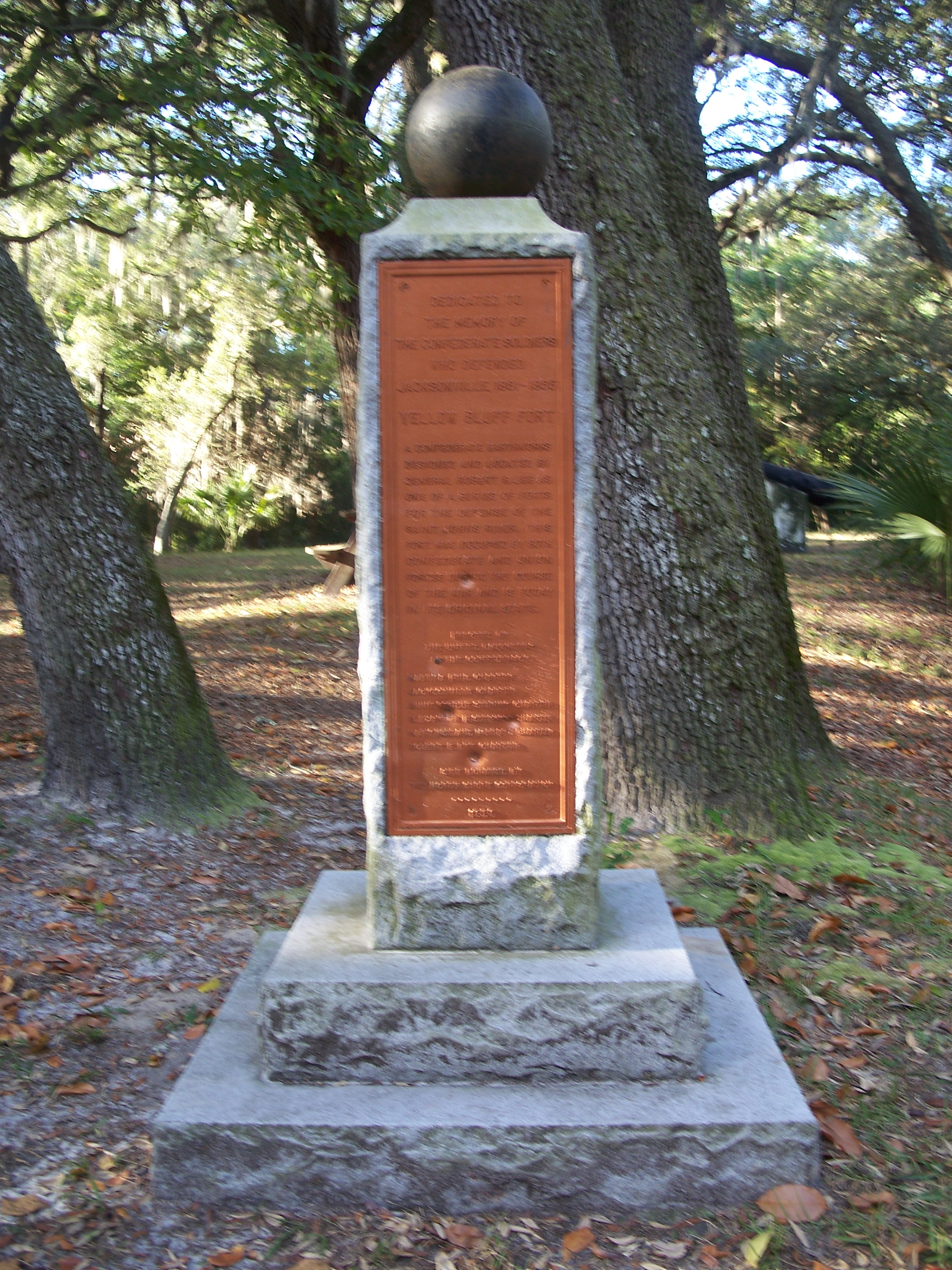
Monument in the park

Yellow Bluff 'Fort' was not a fort at all, but instead an armed and fortified camp constructed during the Civil War. It served to protect shipping supply lines to Jacksonville and through the St. Johns valley from Union attacks. The camp was built in early 1862, holding over 350 personnel at some points of its existence, which lasted until the end of the war.

The site preserves T-shaped earthworks covering about 1.3 acres (0.53 ha).

== Recreational activities ==
Visitors can picnic in an authentic reproduction of a Confederate and Union troop encampment.

== Special events ==
Every year, the park has a day of illustrated presentations and living history demonstrations showing the historical and cultural significance of the area.

== Admission and hours ==
Admission is free, and the park is open daily from 8 a.m. until sunset.
