= John Milton Brannan =

Union Army general (1819–1892)

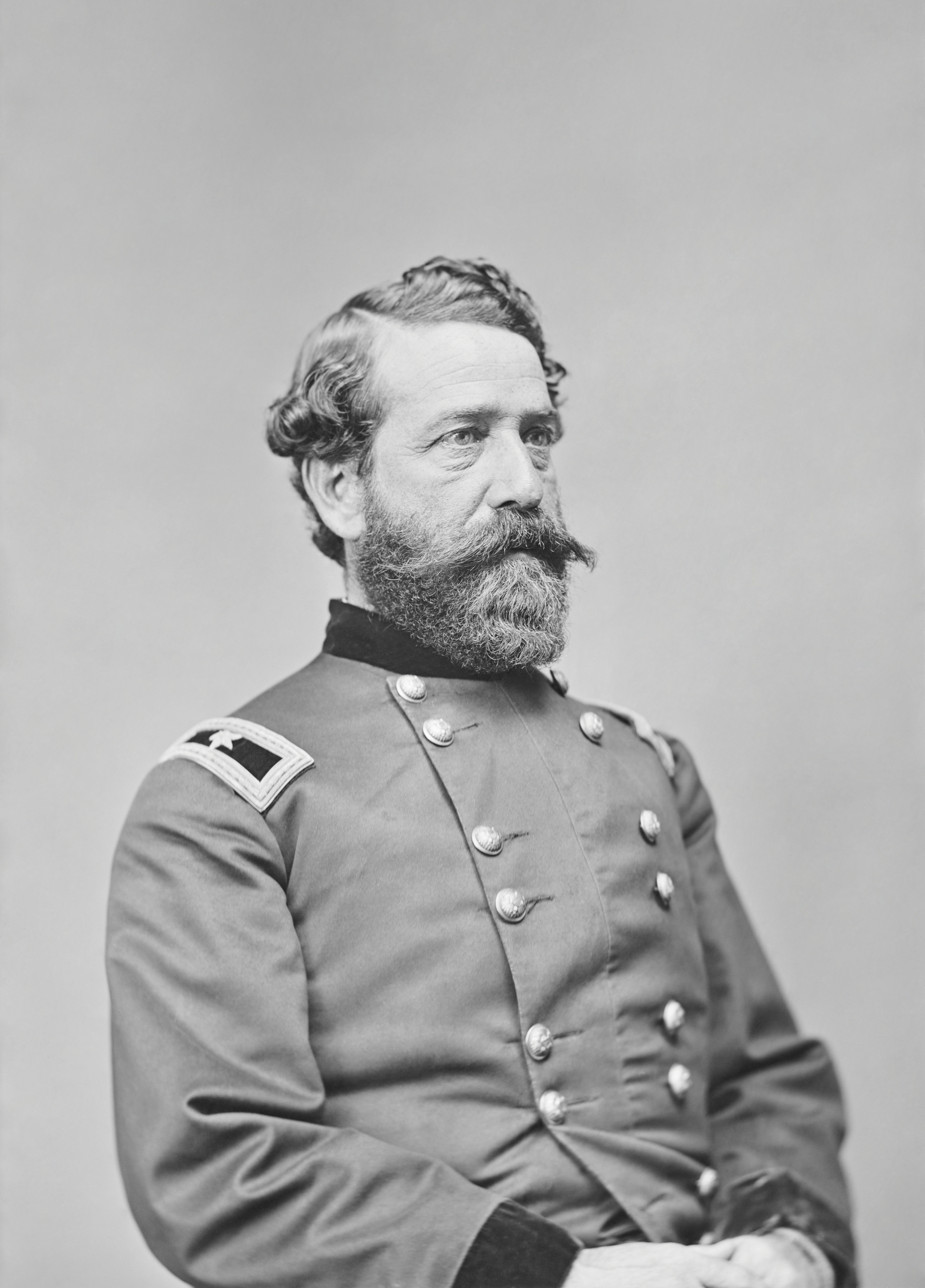
- Born: July 1, 1819; Washington, D.C., US
- Died: December 16, 1892 (aged 73); New York City, US
- Burial place: West Point Cemetery
- Relatives: Ichabod Bennet Crane (father-in-law)
- Military career
- Allegiance: United States; Union
- Branch: United States Army; Union Army
- Service years: 1841–1882
- Rank: Brigadier General; Brevet Major General
- Units: 1st U.S. Artillery; 4th U.S. Artillery
- Commands: Department of Key West; Department of the South; 3rd Division, XIV Corps; Chief of Artillery, Army of the Cumberland
- Conflicts: Mexican–American War; Battle of Cerro Gordo; Battle of Contreras; Battle of Churubusco; Battle of Mexico City; Third Seminole War; American Civil War; Battle of Saint John's Bluff; Battle of Chickamauga; Chattanooga campaign; Atlanta campaign; Fenian Raids; Great Railroad Strike of 1877

John Milton Brannan (July 1, 1819 – December 16, 1892) was an American military officer who served with distinction in the Mexican–American War as a United States Army artillery officer and as a Union Army brigadier general of United States Volunteers in the American Civil War. Brannan held command of the Department of Key West at Fort Zachary Taylor, Florida, part of the Union effort to hold federal installations within Confederate territories early in the war. Later, and most notably, he served as a division commander of the Union XIV Corps at the Battle of Chickamauga in 1863.

Brannan was scandalized by the highly publicized disappearance of his first wife, Eliza Crane Brannan, daughter of Colonel Ichabod B. Crane, in 1858; she mysteriously disappeared after taking a ferry from Staten Island to Lower Manhattan and was initially presumed to have committed suicide or been murdered, but it was later discovered that she had secretly fled to Europe and married another United States Army artillery officer, First Lieutenant Powell T. Wyman.

== Early life and education ==
Brannan was born in Washington, D.C., to John and Sarah Brannan, née Myers. Following the death of his father in 1828, the family remained in Washington, D.C., where his mother was remarried in 1833.

As a young man, Brannan served for about five years as a messenger in the United States House of Representatives. In 1837, he secured an appointment to the United States Military Academy at West Point, New York. His application was sponsored by Congressman Ratliff Boon, the United States representative from Indiana, with the support of numerous other representatives Brannan would have known from his work in the House chamber.

Four years later, Brannan graduated from West Point, ranked 23rd of 52 cadets in the Class of 1841, and was commissioned as a brevet second lieutenant in the 1st U.S. Artillery.

== Military career ==
Shortly after graduation from the military academy, Brannan joined his artillery company at Plattsburgh, New York, where he was present during the border dispute with Canada during that time. The regiment mostly remained in posts throughout the Northeastern United States until the time of the Mexican–American War.

Brannan was promoted to the rank of second lieutenant on May 16, 1842, and first lieutenant on March 3, 1847.

During the Mexican–American War, Brannan's artillery company joined the siege of Veracruz; from there, he participated in skirmishing at La Hoya and the battles of Cerro Gordo, Contreras and Churubusco. He was promoted to the rank of brevet captain for "gallant and meritorious conduct" during the battles of Contreras and Churubusco, and was severely wounded during the battle for Mexico City.

After the war, Brannan was appointed a staff officer, serving in the capacity of regimental adjutant of the 1st U.S. Artillery between April 1847 and November 1854. On November 4, 1854, Brannan was promoted to captain, assuming command of Battery B, 1st U.S. Artillery. He remained in the Southeastern United States at various forts and posts from 1856 until 1861.

His company served in Florida during the Third Seminole War, and was stationed at Key West, Florida, until the beginning of the American Civil War.

=== American Civil War service ===
Upon the outbreak of the Civil War in 1861, Brannan was appointed a brigadier general of United States Volunteers on September 28, 1861. He left his artillery company on detached service for the duration of the war, never returning before he was promoted to the Regular Army rank of major on August 1, 1863. Brannan commanded the Department of Key West during its brief existence (January–March 1862) before it was reorganized into the Department of the South.

In October 1862, he fought in the Battle of Saint John's Bluff where he led infantry troops in the expedition on the St. Johns River against Confederate positions for control of Jacksonville, Florida. Also in the same month, Brannan was placed in command of the Department of the South (which at that time was co-terminus with the command of the Union X Corps) after the death of Major General Ormsby Mitchel. He received a Regular Army brevet promotion to the rank of lieutenant colonel for his service during the battle for Jacksonville, Florida. He served as department commander until January 1863.

In 1863, Brannan led an infantry division under Major General William Rosecrans in the Tullahoma Campaign where he fought at Hoover's Gap. He then served under Major General George H. Thomas during the Chickamauga Campaign in the XIV Corps. At the Battle of Chickamauga, Brannan's division was heavily engaged and he subsequently lost 38 percent of his command in action. He received a Regular Army promotion to the rank of brevet colonel for meritorious service.

From October 1863 until June 1865, Brannan served as Chief of Artillery of the Department of the Cumberland, where he oversaw the defenses at Chattanooga. He was engaged in the Battle of Missionary Ridge and in the Atlanta campaign, where he participated in the battles of Resaca, Dallas and Kennesaw Mountain. He was also present during the siege and surrender of Atlanta. Brannan was promoted to the rank of brevet major general of United States Volunteers in January 1865.

At the close of the war, Brannan received Regular Army brevet promotions to the rank of brigadier general and major general for gallant and meritorious services during the Atlanta Campaign and throughout the war, respectively.

From July 10 to September 25, 1865, Brannan was in command of the District of Savannah and the 1st Division, Department of Georgia, and of the District of Savannah from October 5 to December 19, 1865, and of the Department of Georgia from December 19, 1865, to May 31, 1866.

=== Postwar and late career ===
Portrait

After the Civil War, Brannan was mustered out of the volunteer forces and reverted to his permanent Regular Army rank of major with the 1st U.S. Artillery. He was assigned to artillery duties at Fort Trumbull, Connecticut, Fort Wadsworth, New York, and Ogdensburg, New York.

Brannan declined a promotion to lieutenant colonel of the 22nd U.S. Infantry in July 1866, choosing to remain with the artillery.

While posted at Ogdensburg, he was part of the U.S. Army's response to the Fenian raids into Canada.

During the railroad labor riots of 1877, Brannan was briefly detached from his post at Fort Trumbull for duty in Philadelphia, Pennsylvania, where he was in command of three engineer companies, an artillery company (Battery C, 3rd U.S.), and a detachment of United States Marines. He left Fort Trumbull on July 23, 1877, and returned to command of the post on August 16, 1877.

Brannan was promoted to the rank of lieutenant colonel and transferred to the 4th U.S. Artillery on January 10, 1877, but returned shortly thereafter to the 1st U.S. Artillery.

He was promoted again to lead the 4th U.S. Artillery with the rank of colonel on March 15, 1881, and retired from the U.S. Army on April 19, 1882.

== Personal life ==
Brannan was married to Eliza Crane, daughter of Colonel Ichabod B. Crane (colonel of the 1st U.S. Artillery), on September 16, 1850. They had one daughter named Alida.

While Brannan was posted in Key West, Florida, from 1856, Eliza and their daughter lived in Staten Island, New York, with her mother.

On July 20, 1858, Eliza Brannan disappeared while she was out shopping in New York City. After days of searching, it was believed by officials that she was dead. John Brannan reportedly feared she had committed suicide in a moment of temporary insanity. In 1860, however, Eliza Brannan contacted her brother (Dr. Charles Crane) and notified him that she was, in fact, alive: having originally fled to Italy, she was now remarried and living in Paris, France. Dr. Crane notified Brannan of the news that his wife still lived. Brannan soon learned that the man who Eliza had remarried was Powell T. Wyman. A career artillery officer of the 1st U.S. Artillery, Wyman met Eliza Brannan through a mutual acquaintance and the two corresponded after her flight to Europe. In 1860, First Lieutenant Wyman was denied a leave of absence to visit his lover, and instead resigned his commission and traveled to Italy to join (and later marry) Eliza Brannan. At some point between 1860 and 1862, Wyman and Eliza Brannan returned to the United States, where they lived openly as a married couple.

With the advent of the American Civil War, the matter was set aside: John Brannan remained in Key West throughout 1860 and the first half of 1861, soon accepting a commission as a brigadier general of volunteers and engaged in action throughout the duration of the war. Meanwhile, Powell Wyman accepted a volunteer commission as colonel of the 16th Massachusetts Infantry in August 1861, and he was killed in action in June 1862 at the Battle of Glendale.

Brannan never reconciled with his wife; he obtained a decree of divorce in 1863.

In 1870, Brannan was remarried to Evelyn (Eva) Way; the couple lived in New York following Brannan's retirement.

Brannan died of heart failure in New York in 1892. He was buried temporarily at Woodlawn Cemetery, and later reinterred on the grounds of his alma mater at the West Point Cemetery.

== Legacy ==
Brannan was a member of the Military Order of the Loyal Legion of the United States.

An Endicott Era coast artillery M1890MI 12-inch coast defense mortar battery at Fort Worden was named in honor of Brannan in 1904.

== See also ==
- List of American Civil War generals (Union)
