= Cerro Colorado, Arizona =

Cerro Colorado
- Ghost town
- Location within Arizona Location within the United States
- Coordinates: 31°39′32″N 111°16′21″W
- Country: United States
- State: Arizona
- County: Pima
- Elevation: 3,668 ft (1,118 m)
- Time zone: UTC-7 (MST (no DST))
- Post Office Opened: April 17, 1872
- Post Office Closed: April 15, 1911

Cerro Colorado is a ghost town in southern Pima County, Arizona. The town is located off Arivaca Road, near Arivaca, and is best known for the massacre of mining employees by Mexican outlaws and buried treasure.

== History ==
Cerro Colorado was established around 1855 by Charles D. Poston, who owned the Sonora Exploring & Mining Company in Tubac, Arizona. The most prosperous mine in the area was the Heintzelman Mine, named after Major General Samuel P. Heintzelman, who was the first president of the mining company and later grew famous during the American Civil War. The post office was established on April 17, 1879, and closed on April 15, 1911.

In 1861, fifteen Mexican and Native American men were killed after being buried alive in their shaft when the roof caved in. The men were deep within the shaft so no rescue was possible or attempted. This frightened the Mexican employees, who felt the mine was haunted, so they left and went home to Sonora. Several German and American miners then became employed.

When the Civil War began, United States Army troops left the region to fight the rebels and the town became part of Confederate Arizona. Once again Cerro Colorado was surrounded by Apache land, leaving the settlement under constant threat. At about the same time in 1861, Charles Poston left the mine for business elsewhere, he left his brother John Poston in charge.

=== Cerro Colorado treasure ===
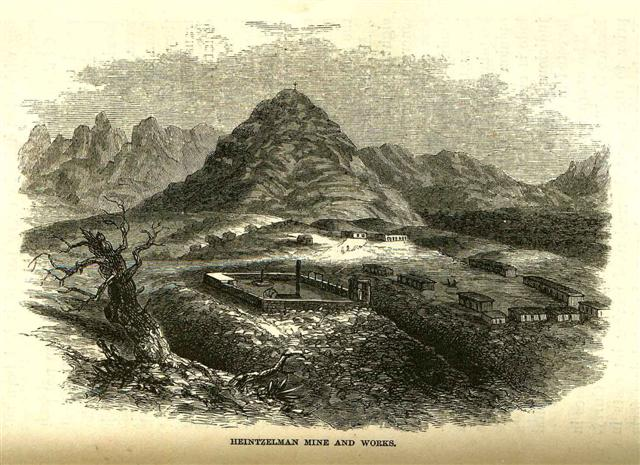
Cerro Colorado in 1864, by J. Ross Browne.

When Charles Poston left Cerro Colorado, the mining operations were constantly halted due to the Mexican employees who continually stole and took their plunder to Sonora. One day, Poston's foreman, known only as Juanito, was caught heading back to Sonora with a load of stolen silver bullion, so Poston had him executed as an example to other thieving employees. The silver was never recovered and was reportedly buried by Juanito somewhere near the mine. Juanito's death only made the matter worse. Within the next few nights, Mexicans stole "whatever they could" and took the property to Sonora, where several Mexican outlaws heard the story of the buried treasure.

The outlaws immediately headed into Arizona for the mine. Once there they won the support of the Mexican employees and destroyed the mine in hopes of finding the silver. After failing to find it they tortured and murdered John Poston and two German miners. As of 2023, nobody has ever found the treasure. When the massacre was over, the outlaws left for Mexico and the mine was rebuilt. By 1864 a walled stone fort was erected on a nearby hill and a guard tower was constructed in the town plaza. A few adobe buildings remain along with the concrete grave of John Poston, and his tombstone.
