= Pacific Division (United States Army) =

Pacific Division of the U. S. Army was one of its superior administrative organizations that existed during the early 19th century and for a short time in the early 20th century.

== Pacific Division 1848–1853 ==
The first Pacific Division of the U.S. Army was created on 10 October 1848, as the Army reorganized its administration for the new territories acquired during the Mexican–American War. 10th Military Department (California) and 11th Military Department (Oregon Territory) were subordinated to the new Division that had its headquarters at Monterey. In June 1849, the headquarters moved to San Francisco for a month then moved to Benicia and the Benicia Arsenal in July 1849.

On 17 May 1851, the Army merged Military Departments 10 and 11 into the Pacific Division as the Army again reorganized its administration on the West Coast. Both of those military departments merged into the Pacific Division ceased to exist. Division headquarters directly administered affairs in California and Oregon Territory. On 15 June 1852, Pacific Division headquarters was moved from Benicia to the San Francisco.

On 31 October 1853, the Pacific Division was replaced by the Department of the Pacific, with headquarters at San Francisco. It was created when the Army abandoned the system of divisions and numbered departments, establishing departments having a descriptive name, and reporting directly to Army Headquarters.

=== Commander of the Pacific Division ===
- Major General Persifor Frazer Smith 10 October 1848–1849
- Brevet Major General Bennet Riley 1849–1851
- Brevet Brigadier General Ethan A. Hitchcock 1851–1853

=== Posts in Military Department 10 ===
- Post at Monterey, Monterey, 1847–1852
  - Monterey Ordnance Depot 1852–1856
- Sonoma Barracks, Sonoma, 1847–1852.
- Camp Sonoma, near Sonoma, 1847–1851
  - Sonoma Post, near Sonoma, 1852–1858
- Camp San José, San Jose, 1848
- Camp Anderson, Sacramento, 1849
- Camp Stanislaus, Riverbank, California, 1849
- Camp Riley, near Otay, 1849
- Camp Salvation, Calexico, California, 1849
- Camp San Miguel, Mission San Miguel Arcángel, 1849–1851
- Benicia Barracks, Benicia, 1849–1898
- Fort Far West, near Marysville, 1849–1852.
- Angel Island Military Reservation, Angel Island 1850–1863
- Camp Rancho de Chino, Chino, 1850–1852
- Camp San Luis Rey, San Luis Rey, 1850–1852
- Camp Frederica, 7 miles from Durham's Ferry, near San Joaquin City, California, 1850
- Camp Vallecito, 1850, now Vallecito County Park
  - Vallecito Depot, 1851–1853
- Fort Defiance, near Winterhaven, 1850
- Camp Santa Isabel, Santa Ysabel, 1851–1852
- Camp McClear, Fresno, 1851
- New San Diego Depot, 1851–1866
- Fort Miller, 1851–1858
- Fort Yuma, 1851–1883
- Benicia Arsenal, Benicia, 1852–1964
- Camp Crane, Bass Lake, 1852
- Camp Fitzgerald, near Winterhaven, California 1852
- Camp Rancho del Jurupa, Rubidoux, 1852–1854
- Fort Reading, Redding, 1852–1856
- Fort Jones, Fort Jones, California, 1852–1858
- Fort Humboldt, 1853–1867

=== Posts in Military Department 11 ===
- Fort Colville, Washington Territory, 1859–1882
- Fort Steilacoom, Washington Territory, (1849–1868)
- Fort Dalles, Oregon, 1850–1867
- Fort Vancouver, Washington Territory, 1849-1889

== Pacific Division, 1904–07 ==
Several Departments were again organized under new Divisions in 1903. The previous Division of the Pacific (1869-91) was re-established and formally stood up in 1904 as the Pacific Division with subordinate or related commands, including the Department of California (to include the Hawaiian Islands) and the Department of the Columbia. The Pacific Division was headquartered at Fort Mason, San Francisco. By the end of 1907, the War Department, under Secretary of War William Howard Taft from 1 February 1904 – 30 June 1908, had eliminated the echelon of administrative units called Divisions and subsequently the Pacific Division that same year.

=== Commander of the Pacific Division ===
- Major General Arthur MacArthur 1903 - 1907
