= Department of Texas =

US Army organization

The Department of Texas was a military department of the United States Army that existed from 1850 to 1861, and again from 1865 to 1866, from 1870 to 1913 and during the First World War. It was subordinate to the Military Division of the Missouri.

== Commanders ==
First creation

- Brevet Major General Persifor Frazer Smith, 1850 to 1856
- Colonel Albert Sidney Johnston, April 1, 1856, to May 18, 1857
- Brevet Major General David E. Twiggs, May 18, 1857, to February 19, 1861
- Lt. Colonel Washington Seawell, December 10, 1859, to February 6, 1860. (temporary or acting)
- Colonel Robert E. Lee, February 6, 1860, to December 12, 1860. (temporary or acting)
- Colonel Carlos A. Waite, February 19, 1861. to April 23, 1861, when the officers of the U.S. Army's Department of Texas are all taken as prisoners of war at the department's headquarters in San Antonio, Texas.

Second creation

- Bvt. Major General Gordon Granger, June 19, 1865, to August 2, 1865
- Bvt. Major General Horatio G. Wright, July 20, 1865, to August 18, 1866

Third creation

- Colonel Joseph J. Reynolds, April 16, 1870, to January 29, 1872
- Brigadier General Christopher C. Augur, November 1871 to March 1875
- Brigadier General Edward Ord, April 11, 1875, to December 6, 1880
- Colonel David S. Stanley, December 7, 1880, to January 3, 1881
- Brigadier General Christopher Columbus Augur, January 2, 1881, to October 31, 1883
- Brigadier General Ranald S. Mackenzie, November 1 to December 19, 1883
- Brigadier General David S. Stanley, May 8, 1884 to June 1, 1892
- Brigadier General Zenas Bliss, April 25, 1895? to May 22, 1897
- Brigadier General Frederick Dent Grant, October 1902 to January 15, 1904
- Brigadier General Jesse M. Lee, February 1904 to January 1907

Fourth creation

- Brigadier General James Parker, May to August 1917
