= Department of the East =

US military administrative district

The Department of the East was a military administrative district established by the U.S. Army several times in its history. The first was from 1853 to 1861, the second Department of the East, from 1863 to 1873, and the last from 1877 to 1913.

== History ==
As part of a major reorganization of the Western Territories, after October 31, 1853, the division echelon was eliminated and the six western departments consolidated into four (Departments of Texas, New Mexico, the West, and the Pacific). The four departments (1st-4th) of the Eastern Division were similarly consolidated into the Department of the East, with boundaries encompassing all the states east of the Mississippi River. It remained thus until August 17, 1861, when the American Civil War created a need for a vast increase in the Union Army and more departments to administer them, leading to discontinuation of the Department of the East.

On January 3, 1863, the Department of the East was revived, to administer the many districts and posts created by the Civil War in New York, New Jersey and the states of New England. It became subordinate to the Military Division of the Atlantic, from 1865 to 1866 and the Division of the Atlantic, in 1868 until this department was discontinued in 1873.

Again the Department of the East was revived in 1877, once again subordinate to the Division of the Atlantic, until the Division was discontinued in 1891. In 1911, it became subordinate to a new Eastern Division, until the Department of the East was discontinued 1913, being replaced by the Eastern Department. The Panama Canal Department was created as a separate formation on 26 June 1917 by separation from the Eastern Department.

The 99th Aero Squadron was reactivated at Mitchel Field under the control of the Eastern Department on 2 July 1919.

The 24th Aero Squadron returned to the United States on or about 1 August 1919 and reported to Mitchel Field, on Long Island, New York. However, the squadron was sent to Park Field, near Memphis, Tennessee, where personnel were de-mobilized and returned to civilian life. It was carried as an administrative unit seemingly under the Eastern Department, however, it was not re-staffed and was finally inactivated on 1 October 1919.

The Eastern Department was discontinued when the Army's command was reorganized by the 1920 amendment to the 1916 Defense Act. It was replaced by the Second Corps Area.

== Headquarters ==
The headquarters of the 1853–1861 Department of the East in 1861 was Troy, New York, except for the few years under the command of Gen. Bankhead, when he made his headquarters at Fort McHenry, in Baltimore, Maryland.

The headquarters of the last Department of the East was originally located in leased office space in New York City until 1878, when the War Department relocated all headquarters functions across the country to army posts due to economic considerations. The headquarters was relocated to Fort Columbus, renamed Fort Jay in 1904 on Governors Island in New York Harbor.

== 1853–1861 Department of the East commanders ==
- Major. Gen. John E. Wool 1853–1854
- Bvt. Brig. Gen. James Bankhead 1854–1856
- Major. Gen. John E. Wool 1857 – Aug 17, 1861

== 1863–1873 Department of the East commanders ==
- Major. Gen. John E. Wool January 3, 1863 – July 18, 1863
- Major. Gen. John A. Dix, July 18, 1863 – June 27, 1865
- Major. Gen. Joseph Hooker June 27, 1865 – August, 1866
- Major. Gen. George Gordon Meade, August, 1866 – January 2, 1868
- Major. Gen. Thomas W. Sherman January 2, 1868 – July 16, 1868
- Major. Gen. Irvin McDowell July 16, 1868 – December 16, 1872

== 1877–1913 Department of the East commanders ==
In 1878, the War Department directed that all departmental commands, if not located on a post, were to give up leased office space and off-post housing allowances and relocate headquarters and staff to the nearest Army post. In New York City, the headquarters was moved to Fort Columbus on Governors Island in New York Harbor.

- 1878 Winfield S. Hancock
- 1886 John M. Schofield
- 1888 Oliver O. Howard
- 1891 John M. Schofield
- 1891 Oliver O. Howard
- 1894 Nelson A. Miles
- 1895 Thomas H. Ruger
- 1897 Wesley Merritt
- 1898 20 May to 2 July Royal T. Frank
- 1898 2 July to 24 October George L. Gillespie
- 1898 William R. Shafter
- 1899 Wesley Merritt
- 1900 John R. Brooke
- 1902 Arthur MacArthur
- 1902 Adna R. Chaffee
- 1903 Henry C. Corbin
- 1904 Frederick D. Grant
- 1904 James F. Wade
- 1907 Frederick D. Grant
- 1908 Leonard Wood
- 1910 Frederick D. Grant
- 1912 Tasker H. Bliss
- 1912 Thomas H. Barry

== 1913–1920 Eastern Department commanders ==
- 1913 Thomas H. Barry
- 1914 Robert K. Evans
- 1914 Leonard Wood
- 1917 J. Franklin Bell
- 1917 Eli D. Hoyle
- 1918 William A. Mann
- 1918 J. Franklin Bell
- 1919 Thomas H. Barry
- 1919 Charles Justin Bailey
