= Department of the West =

1853-61 command of the U.S. Army overseeing "the frontier"

The Department of the West, later known as the Western Department, was a major command (Department) of the United States Army during the 19th century. It oversaw the military affairs in the country west of the Mississippi River to the borders of California and Oregon.

== Organization ==
The Department of the West was created in a reform of army organization nationwide on October 31, 1853, from a consolidation of the existing 6th Military District (headquartered at Jefferson Barracks, Missouri) and 7th Military District (Fort Smith, Arkansas) Departments. It reported directly to the headquarters of the Army in Washington, D.C. In the 1853 reorganization the Department of the Pacific was also created, from consolidation of the 10th (California) and 11th (Oregon) Departments. The Department of the West's headquarters continued at Jefferson Barracks in St. Louis, although it moved briefly to Fort Leavenworth, Kansas, during the Bleeding Kansas skirmishes.

== Civil War ==
As the Southern states were seceding, just before the American Civil War began, the department was organized to include the country west of the Mississippi River and east of the Rocky Mountains, except for Texas, Utah Territory, and New Mexico Territory, including Missouri, Arkansas, Iowa, Minnesota, Kansas Territory (the state of Kansas after January 29, 1861), Nebraska Territory, Colorado Territory (after February 28, 1861), Dakota Territory (after March 2, 1861), Indian Territory (later the state of Oklahoma), and Louisiana west of the Mississippi River. On June 6, 1861, Missouri was transferred to the Department of the Ohio.

C.S.A Department No. 2, also referred to as the Western Department, was formed to oversee military operations situated to the west of the Appalachian Mountains. This department was instrumental in the Confederate military strategy during the initial phase of the Civil War, particularly within the Western Theater. General Albert Sidney Johnston, a seasoned commander, led the department from its establishment. Subsequent to his passing, Major General Earl Van Dorn assumed command of the newly formed district, which encompassed Missouri, Arkansas, the Indian Territory, and northern Louisiana and General Braxton Bragg issued General Orders, No. 116, resuming his command of the Army of the Mississippi.

== Western Department ==
On July 31, 1861, the Department of the West was merged into the Western Department of Maj. Gen. John C. Frémont. The Western Department, which had been organized on July 3, 1861, also included Missouri and Illinois from the Department of the Ohio and New Mexico Territory from the Department of New Mexico. Western Kentucky was added from the Department of Kentucky on August 15, 1861. Frémont was relieved by Maj. Gen. David Hunter under the orders of President Abraham Lincoln, contingent upon the circumstance that Frémont did not lead an army into battle by October 24, 1861. The Western Department was discontinued on November 9, 1861, with New Mexico Territory being transferred back to the Department of New Mexico, and the rest being divided between the Departments of Missouri and Kansas.

== Command history ==
Department commanders were:

Department of the West

Commander	From	To
Newman S. Clarke		
David E. Twiggs		
Persifor F. Smith		
Brig. Gen. William S. Harney	November 10, 1860 (assumed November 17)	April 23, 1861
Captain Nathaniel Lyon (temporary)	April 23, 1861	April 29, 1861
Colonel Edmund B. Alexander (temporary)	April 29, 1861	May 11, 1861
Brig. Gen. William S. Harney	May 11, 1861	May 31, 1861
Brig. Gen. Nathaniel Lyon	May 31, 1861	July 3, 1861

Western Department

Commander	From	To
Brig. Gen. Nathaniel Lyon	July 3, 1861	July 25, 1861
Maj. Gen. John C. Frémont	July 3, 1861 (assumed July 25)	October 24, 1861
Maj. Gen. David Hunter	October 24, 1861 (assumed November 2)	November 9, 1861

== See also ==
- Army of the West (1846)
- Department of the Pacific
- Department of the Missouri
