= Department of California =

Administrative department of the US Army

Coordinates: 38°N 119°W

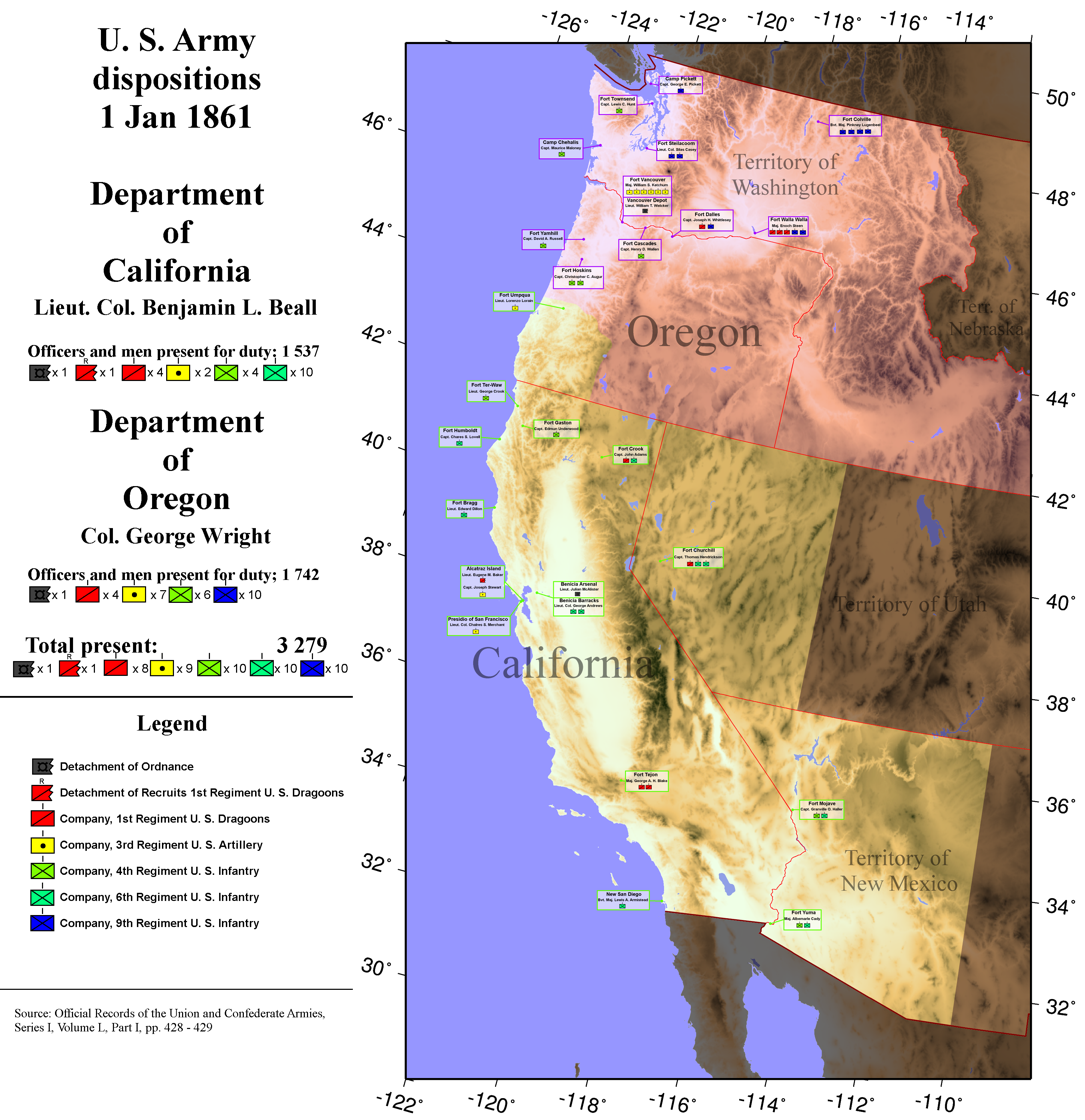
Garrisons of the Departments of California (in yellow) and Oregon, 1 January 1861

The Department of California was an administrative department of the United States Army. The department was created in 1858, replacing the original Department of the Pacific, and it was ended by the reorganizations of the Henry L. Stimson Plan implemented in February 1913. As with the preceding organization, headquarters were in San Francisco. Its creation was authorized by General Orders, No. 10, of the War Department, Adjutant-General's Office, September 13, 1858.

As first established, the department covered all territory within the latter-day state borders of Arizona, Nevada, California, and a sizable square of southwestern Oregon representing the Rogue River District and Umpqua District.

== Commanders ==
The Department of California was commanded first by Brevet Brigadier General Newman S. Clarke, Colonel U.S. 6th Infantry Regiment, until his death on October 17, 1860. It was next commanded by Lt. Colonel Benjamin L. Beall, U.S. 1st Dragoon Regiment, who had assumed command, by seniority of rank, on the death of General Clarke, on October 17, 1860. It was merged into the restored Department of the Pacific on January 15, 1861, as the District of California administering the same territories, commanded by Brevet Brigadier General Albert Sidney Johnston (1803-1862), from January 15, 1861.

== Reduction to District status 1861-1865 ==
When General Edwin Vose Sumner, relieved General Johnston during March 1861 he continued in command of the Department of California now renamed the District of California. His successor in October 1861 (six months after the beginning of the Civil War), Brigadier General George Wright (1803-1865), continued in command of the district even after losing command of the superior Department of the Pacific, on July 1, 1864, to Gen. Irvin McDowell (1818-1885), who had recently been embarrassingly defeated in the first major battle of the Civil War three years before in the First Battle of Bull Run (Manassas) in northern Virginia, just south of the national federal capital city of Washington, D.C., in July 1861.

== Department again June 1865 - February 1913 ==
During June 1865, Col. Edward McGarry (1820-1867), was ordered to succeed Brigadier General George Wright, (who was relocating to his new command of the Department of the Columbia, further north in Oregon, but died later that year of 1865), in command of the District of California until General McDowell could take command of the district, which was once again raised to department status under the larger Military Division of the Pacific, now commanded by Major General Henry W. Halleck (1815-1872), (and former general-in-chief during the previous early period of the Civil War at the U.S. War Department headquarters in Washington, D.C., under 16th President Abraham Lincoln). The territory encompassed by the new Department of California now consisted of the States of California and adjacent Nevada and further east of the District of Arizona and District of New Mexico in the adjacent federal Territories of Arizona and New Mexico. Maj. Gen. Irvin McDowell, of the U. S. Army, was assigned to command this Department of California.

The Department of Arizona was established as part of the Division of the Pacific on April 15, 1870. It consisted of the Arizona Territory and the adjacent state of California south of a line from the northwest corner of Arizona, west to Point Conception on the Pacific Ocean coast, so as to include most of Southern California.

From December 7, 1871, the one general officer at San Francisco commanded both the Division of the Pacific and the Department of California and the separate staffs were consolidated into one. On July 1, 1878, Division of the Pacific headquarters was relocated from the city of San Francisco to the Presidio of San Francisco, along the coastline of San Francisco Bay adjacent to the city.

The Department of Arizona lost Southern California to the Department of California further west on February 14, 1883, but regained California again south of the 35th parallel three years later on December 15, 1886. The Department of California then consisted of the state of California north of the 35th parallel of latitude and adjacent state of Nevada.

The Military Division of the Pacific was discontinued on July 3, 1891. Each of the three subordinate departments of Arizona, California, and the Columbia, then reported directly to the War Department. The Department of California, with its headquarters at San Francisco, consisted of California north of the 35th parallel and Nevada.

The Hawaiian Islands were added to the department July 12, 1898. It became the District of Hawaii in 1910 as part of the Department of California.

From 1904 to 1907, the Department of California, as well as the Department of the Columbia, were subordinate to a re-established Division of the Pacific known as Pacific Division. It became independent again after 1907 until they were subordinated to a new Western Division from 1911 to 1913.

On February 15, 1913 the Department of California, with all the mainland territorial departments, was disbanded for a new organization of the Army. The territory of the former departments of the Columbia and California were now controlled by the Western Department, except for the District of Hawaii that now became the independent Department of Hawaii.

== Commanders ==
=== Department of California 1865 to December 7, 1871 ===
- General Irvin McDowell, July 27, 1865 - March 31, 1868
- Major General Henry Halleck, (temp), March 31, 1868 - April 24, 1868
- Major General E. O. C. Ord, April 24, 1868 - November 18, 1871

=== Military Division of the Pacific and Department of California ===
- Major General John M. Schofield, December 7, 1871 - July 1, 1876
- Major General Irvin McDowell, July 1, 1876 - October 15, 1882
- Major General John M. Schofield, October 15, 1882 - November 30, 1883
- Major General John Pope, November 30, 1883 - March 16, 1886
- Major General Oliver Otis Howard, March 16, 1886 – 1888
- Brigadier General Nelson A. Miles, November 23, 1888 - September 1, 1890
- Brigadier General John Gibbon September 1, 1890 - April 20, 1891
- Brigadier General Thomas H. Ruger, April 20, 1891 - July, 1891

=== Department of California after July 3, 1891 - February 15, 1913 ===
- Brigadier General Thomas H. Ruger, July 3, 1891 - November 10, 1894
- Brigadier General James W. Forsyth, November 10, 1894 - 1897
- Major General William Rufus Shafter 1897 - May 1898
- ?, May 1898 - September 1898
- Major General William Rufus Shafter September 1898 - February 1901
- Major General Samuel B. M. Young February 1901 - March 1902
- Major General Robert P. Hughes March 1902 - April 1, 1903
- Major General Arthur MacArthur, Jr., April 1, 1903 - September 30, 1904
- Brigadier General Francis Moore, September 30, 1904 - March 31, 1905
- Brigadier-General Frederick Funston March 31, 1905 - 1907
- Col. Marion F. Maus, Aug. 10, 1908 -
- Brigadier General John Joseph Pershing, 1907 - October 1908
- Brigadier General Frederick A. Smith, October 1908 - January 13, 1909
- Major General John F. Weston, January 13, 1909 - June 30, 1909
- Major General Thomas H. Barry, June 30, 1909 - August 12, 1910
- Brigadier General Tasker H. Bliss August 12, 1910 - August 13, 1911
- Brig. Gen. Daniel H. Brush, from July 1, 1911, to April 7, 1912
- Colonel John P. Wisser, Coast Artillery Corps (temporary), May 2 to June 26, 1912
- Brig. Gen. Walter S. Schuyler, June 27, 1912 - January 2, 1913
- Colonel John P. Wisser, January 3, 1913 - February 15, 1913

== Posts in the Department of California ==
=== California ===
- Benicia Arsenal, Benicia, 1851–1964
- New San Diego Depot, San Diego, 1851-June, 1866.
- Fort Yuma, Fort Yuma Indian Reservation, 1851–1883
- Benicia Barracks, Benicia, 1852–1866
- Post of Alcatraz Island or Fort Alcatraz, 1853–1907
- Roop's Fort, Fort Defiance, Susanville 1853-1863
- Fort Humboldt, Eureka, 1853–1867
- Fort Point San José, San Francisco, 1853–1882
- Fort Point, San Francisco, 1853–1886
- Fort Tejon, near Lebec, 1854-1861, 1863-1864.
- Camp Burton, near San Diego, 1855
- Fort Crook 1857-1869
- Fort Bragg, 1857-1864.
- Fort Ter-Waw, 1857-1862
- Fort Mojave 1858-1861, 1863–1890
- Fort Beale 1859-1861
  - Fort Piute 1864-1868
- Fort Gaston, 1859–1892
- Fort Soda, Hancock's Redoubt 1860
  - Fort Soda Lake or Camp Soda Springs (present-day Zzyzx) 1863 - 1868
- Camp Cady 1860-1871 20 miles east of Barstow
- Camp Allen, Oakland 1860-?
- Camp Dragoon Bridge, 1860-1863
