= Military Division of the Pacific =

The Military Division of the Pacific was a major command (Department) of the United States Army during the late 19th century.

== Formation ==
On July 27, 1865, the Military Division of the Pacific was created under Major General Henry W. Halleck, replacing the Department of the Pacific, consisting of the Department of the Columbia that now consisted of the state of Oregon and the territories of Washington and Idaho and the expanded Department of California that now consisted of the states of California and Nevada and the Territory of New Mexico and Territory of Arizona. Headquarters for the Division of the Pacific and the Department of California remained in the City of San Francisco.

=== Events within the Division of the Pacific ===
On March 18, 1868, the Army established the Department of Alaska under the Division of the Pacific. Department of Alaska was discontinued on July 1, 1870, and Alaska was absorbed by the Department of the Columbia.

The Department of Arizona was established under the Division of the Pacific on April 15, 1870. It consisted of Arizona Territory and California south of a line from the northwest corner of Arizona to Point Conception so as to include most of Southern California.

From December 7, 1871, the one general officer at San Francisco commanded both the Division of the Pacific and the Department of California and the separate staffs were consolidated into one. On July 1, 1878, Division of the Pacific headquarters moved from San Francisco to the Presidio of San Francisco.

In June 1875, the part of the Territory of Idaho that lay east of the extension of the western boundary of Utah, and including Fort Hall, was detached from the Department of Columbia and added to the Department of the Platte.

On July 1, 1876, Gen. Irvin McDowell, formerly commander of the Department of the Pacific was for a second time assigned to the command of the Pacific coast Division, which comprised also the Department of the Columbia, commanded by Brig. Gen. Oliver O. Howard, and the Department of Arizona, commanded by Col. O. B. Willcox, 12th Infantry Regiment.

The Department of Arizona lost Southern California on February 14, 1883, but regained California south of the 35th parallel on December 15, 1886. The Department of California, consisted of California north of the 35th parallel and Nevada.

On November 30, 1885, the New Mexico Territory transferred from the Department of the Missouri to the Department of Arizona, coming under the Division of the Pacific.

Early in 1887, the headquarters of the Division of the Pacific, failed to secure an appropriation for a suitable administration building and moved from the Presidio of San Francisco back to the City of San Francisco.

== End of the Military Division of the Pacific ==
The Military Division of the Pacific was discontinued on July 3, 1891. Each of the three subordinate departments of Arizona, California, and the Columbia, then reported directly to the War Department. The Department of California, with its headquarters at San Francisco, consisted of California north of the 35th parallel and Nevada.

== Commanders of the Military Division of the Pacific ==
- Major General Henry W. Halleck, July 27, 1865 - June 1, 1869
- Major General George H. Thomas, June 1, 1869 - March 28, 1870
- Major General John M. Schofield, March 28, 1870 - July 1, 1876
- Major General Irvin McDowell, July 1, 1876 - October 15, 1882
- Major General John M. Schofield, October 15, 1882 - November 30, 1883
- Major General John Pope, November 30, 1883 - March 16, 1886
- Major General Oliver Otis Howard, March 16, 1886 – November 23, 1888
- Brigadier General Nelson A. Miles, November 23, 1888 - September 1, 1890
- Brigadier General John Gibbon September 1, 1890 - April 20, 1891
- Brigadier General Thomas H. Ruger, April 20, 1891 - July, 1891
