= Military Division of the Mississippi =

US Army Civil War administrative division

The Military Division of the Mississippi was an administrative division of the United States Army during the American Civil War that controlled all military operations in the Western Theater from 1863 until the end of the war.

== History ==
The division was originally created by President Abraham Lincoln to reorganize the Union troops in the Western Theater after the serious Union defeat at the Battle of Chickamauga. Its first commander, "with his headquarters in the field," was Major General Ulysses S. Grant. When Grant was called east, he was succeeded by William T. Sherman.

The division was organized on October 16, 1863, to consist of the Departments of the Ohio, the Tennessee, and the Cumberland, which embraced all of the Union armies stationed between the Mississippi River and the Appalachian Mountains. On January 31, 1865, the Department of North Carolina was added. On February 10, 1865, the Department of Kentucky was added. On April 19, 1865, the portions of the Department of North Carolina that were not occupied by William T. Sherman at the time were transferred to the Military Division of the James. The division was reconstituted on June 27, 1865, to include the Departments of the Ohio, the Missouri, and Arkansas. The Department of the Platte was added on March 26, 1866. The Military Division of the Mississippi was discontinued on August 6, 1866.

The Division of the Mississippi was victorious at the Battle of Chattanooga in November 1863, effectively routing the Confederate armies in Tennessee. When General Grant was called East by Lincoln to command all the Union armies, he was succeeded as head of the division by Maj. Gen. William Tecumseh Sherman. Under Sherman, the division invaded the state of Georgia, capturing Atlanta in September 1864 and then marching to the port of Savannah. As commander of the division, General Sherman issued his Special Field Orders, No. 15 in January 1865. He then led the march through the Carolinas that culminated with the successful Battle of Bentonville and the surrender in April 1865, by General Joseph E. Johnston, of all the Confederate armies in North Carolina, South Carolina, Georgia, and Florida.

== Command history ==
Commander	From	To	Major Battles, Campaigns
Major General Ulysses S. Grant	October 16, 1863 (assumed October 18)	March 18, 1864	Battle of Chattanooga
Major General William T. Sherman	March 18, 1864	August 6, 1866	Atlanta campaign, Savannah Campaign, Carolinas campaign, Franklin-Nashville Campaign
