= Military Division of the Atlantic =

Military Division of the Atlantic was one of the military divisions of the U.S. Army created by GENERAL ORDERS No. 118. on June 27, 1865, at the end of the American Civil War. President Andrew Johnson directed that the United States was to be divided into military divisions and sub-divided into military departments. This was a reorganization of the prevision divisions and departments. Among other things, the Military Division of the James was discontinued and most of the territory included in that division was included in the Military Division of the Atlantic.

Military Division of the Atlantic included the Department of the East, Department of the Lakes, Middle Department, Department of Virginia, Department of North Carolina and Department of South Carolina with its headquarters at Philadelphia. Following the disbanding of the Military Division of the South, the Department of the South was added to this command.

== Commanders of the Military Division of the Atlantic 1865–1866 ==
- Major General George G. Meade, June 27, 1865 – August 6, 1866

== Commanders of the Military Division of the Atlantic 1868–1891 ==
- Major General Winfield S. Hancock, March 28, 1868 – March 20, 1869
- Major General George G. Meade, March 20, 1869 – November 6, 1872
- Major General Winfield S. Hancock, December 16, 1872 – April 12, 1886
- Major General John M. Schofield, April 13, 1886 – December 12, 1888
- Major General Oliver O. Howard, December 12, 1888 – 1891
