= Military Division of the James =

Division of the United States Army in 1865

The Military Division of the James was an administrative division or formation of the United States Army which existed for ten weeks at the end of the American Civil War. This military division controlled military operations between April 19, 1865, and June 27, 1865, in parts of Virginia and North Carolina under control of two main Union armies, the Army of the Potomac and the Army of the James.

Due to the surrender of the main Confederate armies in these areas of Virginia and North Carolina on April 9, 1865, and April 18, 1865, and the collapse of Confederate civilian authority, the Military Division of the James and its constituent military departments and military districts were responsible for maintaining order and keeping the peace in the areas of States under its control until civilian government in those States as members of the Union could be restored. A few small military actions occurred in North Carolina during the existence of this military division.

== Background ==
The Confederate States Army was the military land force of the Confederate States of America (Confederacy) during the American Civil War (1861–1865) which fought in support of the effort of eleven Southern States to secede from the Union and establish the Confederate States of America as a separate nation. The Confederate States Army fought the United States Army forces organized as the Union Army, which fought to preserve the Union of all the States. The Union Army comprised the small Regular Army (United States) and the much larger temporary force of volunteers. About two percent of the soldiers of the volunteer force actually were conscripts. Another six percent of the soldiers were substitutes paid for by draftees. The Union Army and Confederate States Army were divided into several independent armies and departments operating in various geographic areas throughout the Confederacy and the "Border States".

The main Confederate army in Virginia as the war in that State ended, the Army of Northern Virginia under the command of General Robert E. Lee, surrendered to Union Army commander Lieutenant General Ulysses S. Grant, who had headquarters with Major General George G. Meade's Army of the Potomac, on April 9, 1865 (officially April 12, 1865). The main Confederate army in North Carolina as the war in that State ended, the remnants of the Army of Tennessee and various other units under the command of General Joseph E. Johnston, surrendered to the Union Army of the Tennessee under the command of Major General William T. Sherman on April 18, 1865 (officially April 26, 1865). Other Confederate military land forces still in the field in other parts of the Confederacy surrendered to Union Army forces, or simply disbanded, between April 16, 1865, and June 28, 1865.

== Organization ==
The Military Division of the James was organized under the command of Major General Henry W. Halleck on April 19, 1865, after the surrender of the main Confederate armies in Virginia and North Carolina. This military division included the Department of the Potomac (see Army of the Potomac), under the command of Major General John M. Schofield (since January 31, 1865), Department of Virginia under the command of Major General George G. Meade (since January 11, 1865), and that part of the Department of North Carolina (1865) not under the occupation of the troops under the command of Major General William T. Sherman. The part of the Department of North Carolina included in the Military Division of the James was under the command of Major General John M. Schofield (since January 31, 1865 until June 20, 1865) and then under the command of Major General Jacob Dolson Cox (until June 28, 1865).

In addition to maintaining order in the territory of the military division, Union troops were deployed to assist the impoverished population of the area.

In a law approved March 3, 1865, Congress established the Freedmen's Bureau (Bureau of Refugees, Freedmen, and Abandoned Lands), in the United States Department of War for "the supervision and management of all abandoned lands, and the control of all subjects relating to refugees and freedmen from rebel states, or from any district of country within the territory embraced in the operations of the army, under such rules and regulations as may be prescribed by the head of the bureau and approved by the President." The law also provided that "the Secretary of War may direct such issues of provisions, clothing, and fuel, as he may deem needful for the immediate and temporary shelter and supply of destitute and suffering refugees and freedmen and their wives and children, under such rules and regulations as he may direct." The law further provided that "the commissioner, under the direction of the President, shall have authority to set apart, for the use of loyal refugees and freedmen, such tracts of land within the insurrectionary states as shall have been abandoned, or to which the United States shall have acquired title by confiscation or sale, or otherwise.... The law provided for no additional staff other than a commissioner, 10 possible clerks and 10 possible assistant commissioners for States, and no additional funding from the federal government specifically for the bureau (other than for the commissioner's salary). In the absence of additional separate personnel or funding, the U.S. Army operating in the military divisions and their constituent departments and districts had to provide personnel for the bureau, including those needed for operations of the bureau in Virginia and North Carolina, in 1865.

== Discontinuance; Inclusion in Military Division of the Atlantic ==
The Military Division of the James was discontinued on June 27, 1865, the day before the official surrender date of the final large Confederate army in the Trans-Mississippi Department.

The departments of the Military Division of the James were among those included in the Military Division of the Atlantic, under the command of Major General George G. Meade, which was created by U.S. Army General Orders No. 118, on June 27, 1865.
