= Halleck: Lincoln's Chief of Staff =

Biography by Stephen E. Ambrose of Union Civil War general Henry W. Halleck

- First edition
- Author: Stephen E. Ambrose
- Language: English
- Subject: Military Biography
- Genre: Non-fiction
- Publisher: Louisiana State University Press
- Publication date: 1962
- Publication place: United States
- Media type: Print (hardcover and paperback)
- Pages: 226
- ISBN: 0-807-12071-5
- OCLC: 251908948

Halleck: Lincoln's Chief of Staff is the biography of Union Army General-in-Chief Henry Halleck written by Stephen E. Ambrose and published in 1962. In this book, which originated as a dissertation, Ambrose provides an interpretation contrary to previous assessments of this "controversial figure" from the American Civil War.
