= Department of the South =

Former military department in the US Army

The Department of the South was a military department of the United States Army that existed in several iterations in the 19th century during and after the American Civil War.

== 1862–65 ==
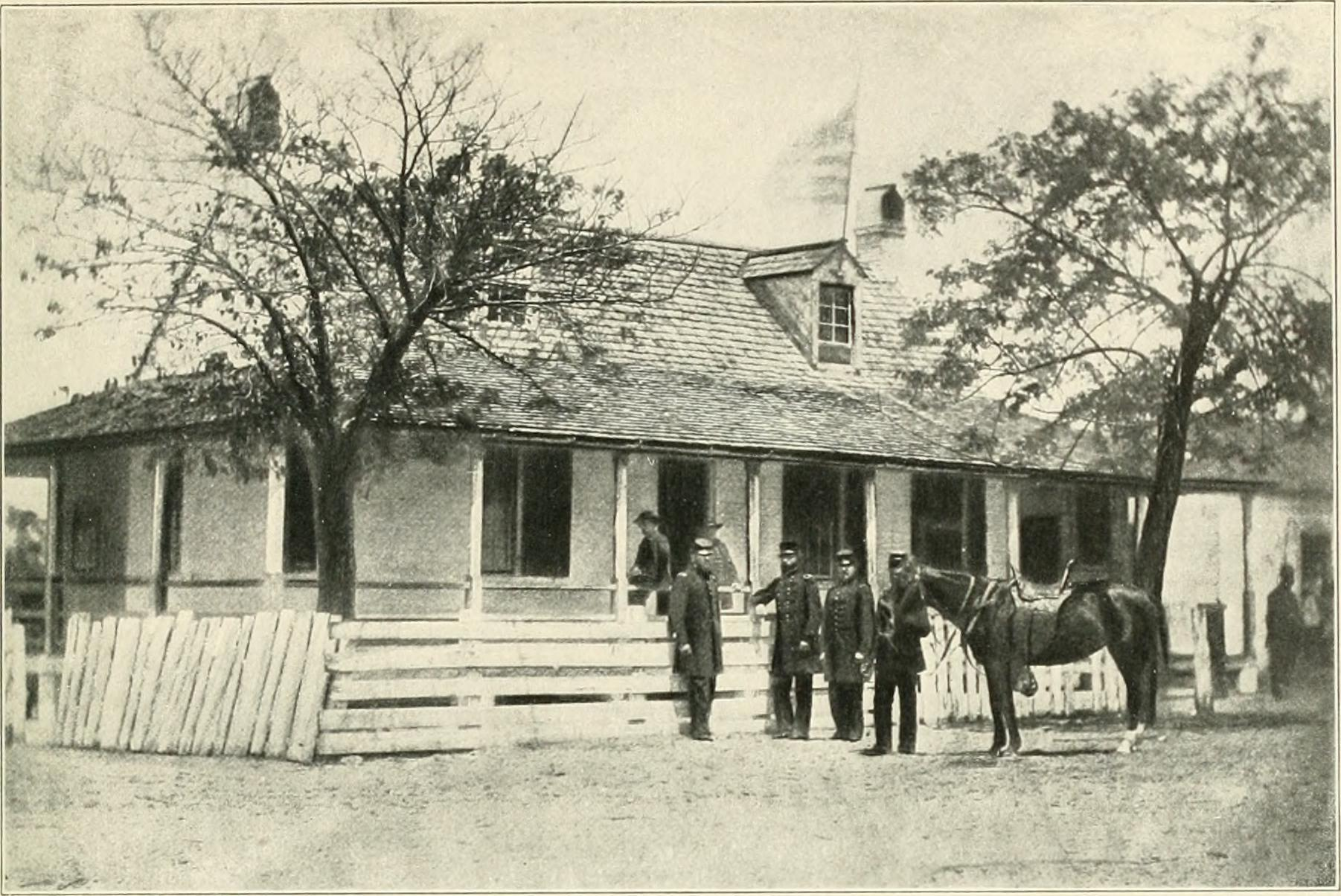
Gen. Gillmore's headquarters at Hilton Head

After the first 11 months of the American Civil War, starting March 15, 1862, the Department of the South comprised Union army troops occupying the states of Florida (March 15, 1862 to August 8, 1862 and thereafter only parts of the State of Florida), Georgia, and South Carolina. This included troops stationed at Hilton Head and Morris Island in South Carolina, along with Savannah, Georgia, and Pensacola, Florida. On August 8, 1862, Florida west of the Apalachicola River was detached to the Department of the Gulf. On March 16, 1863, Key West and the Dry Tortugas were transferred to the Department of the Gulf. Until 1864, the department's command was coterminous with that of the X Corps. North Carolina was added to the department briefly, from January 18, 1865 to January 31, 1865.

On May 17, 1865, that part of Florida remaining in the department was transferred to the Department of the Gulf. Under General Orders No. 118 on June 27, 1865, the States of Georgia and South Carolina were merged into the Department of Georgia and the Department of South Carolina. This order ended this iteration of the Department of the South until it was reconstituted with different territory on May 19, 1866.

=== Commanders ===
- Major General David Hunter, March 31 to September 3, 1862
- Major General Ormsby M. Mitchel, September 3, 1862 to October 30, 1862 (died of yellow fever)
- Brigadier General John M. Brannan, October 30, 1862 to January 21, 1863
- Major General David Hunter, January 21 to June 3, 1863
- Major General Quincy Adams Gilmore, June 12, 1863, to May 1, 1864
- Brigadier General John P. Hatch, May 1, 1864 to May 26, 1864
- Major General John G. Foster, May 26, 1864 to February 11, 1865
- Major General Quincy Adams Gilmore, February 9 to November 17, 1865.

== 1866-1867 ==
This iteration of the Department of the South, organized on May 19, 1866, comprised posts in Georgia and Alabama. On August 6, 1866, it was reorganized to include North Carolina and South Carolina from the Department of the Carolinas. Georgia and Alabama were moved to the Department of Tennessee. On May 11, 1867, this iteration of the department was merged into the Second Military District.

== 1868 ==
This iteration of the Department of the South comprised posts in North Carolina and South Carolina from the Second Military District and posts in Alabama, Florida and Georgia from the Third Military District. It was commanded by General George G. Meade from July 28, 1868 to March 13, 1869.

== 1869–1883 ==
In this iteration, the Department of the South comprised reconstructed states in the former Confederacy. It was subordinate to the Military Division of the South until 1876, and the Military Division of the Atlantic after that.

=== Commanders ===
...

- Brigadier General Thomas Howard Ruger, September 8, 1876–July 1, 1878
- Brigadier General Christopher Columbus Augur, July 1, 1878–December 26, 1880
- Colonel Henry Jackson Hunt, January 6, 1881–September 14, 1883
