= Military Division of the South =

Military Division of the South was a U.S. Army unit established in 1869 during the Reconstruction era, but had an earlier life after the War of 1812 through 1821 when Andrew Jackson held that command and the military division was discontinued.

Major General H. W. Halleck was assigned to the command of the military division of the South, which was composed of the Departments of the South and Louisiana, of the Fourth Military District (Mississippi and Arkansas), and the Department of the Cumberland (composed of the States of West Virginia, Tennessee, and Kentucky), with its headquarters at Louisville, Kentucky. As the former Confederate states were reconstructed, they were added to this military division. Major General Halleck, in command of the Military Division of the Pacific proceed to his new command as soon as he was relieved by Major General George Henry Thomas. The division was merged into the Military Division of the Atlantic in 1876.

== Commanders ==
- Major General Henry Wager Halleck, 1869 – January 9, 1872 (died in office)
- Major General George Gordon Meade, 1872 – November 6, 1872 (died in office)
- Major General Irvin McDowell, December 16, 1872 – June 30, 1876
