= Henry Halleck =

General in Chief of the Union Armies in the American Civil War (1815-1872)

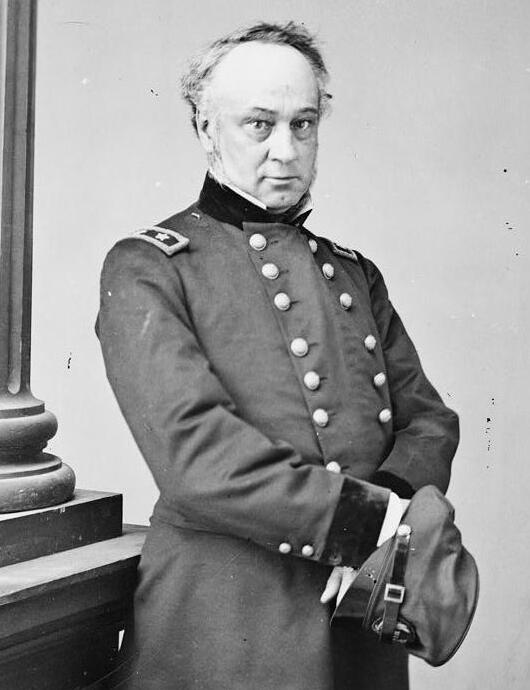
- Halleck c. 1860–1865

General in Chief of the Armies of the United States
- In office July 23, 1862 – March 9, 1864
- President: Abraham Lincoln
- Preceded by: Edwin Stanton
- Succeeded by: Ulysses S. Grant

Personal details
- Born: Henry Wager Halleck; January 16, 1815 Westernville, New York, U.S.
- Died: January 9, 1872 (aged 56) Louisville, Kentucky, U.S.
- Resting place: Green-Wood Cemetery
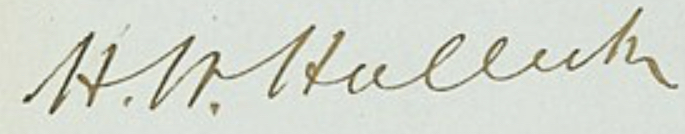
- Signature
- Nickname: "Old Brains"

Military service
- Allegiance: United States
- Branch/service: United States Army
- Years of service: 1839–1854, 1861–1872
- Rank: Major-General
- Commands: Military Division of the Pacific; United States Army; Western Theater; Department of the Missouri; General-in-Chief of the Union Armies; Chief-of-Staff of the Union Armies; Military Division of the James; Military Division of the Pacific; Military Division of the South
- Battles/wars: Mexican–American War; American Civil War; Siege of Corinth

Henry Wager Halleck (January 16, 1815 – January 9, 1872) was a senior United States Army officer, scholar, and lawyer. A noted expert in military studies, he was known by a nickname that became derogatory: "Old Brains". He was an important participant in the admission of California as a state and became a successful lawyer and land developer. Halleck served as the General-in-Chief of the Armies of the United States from 1862 to 1864, and then became Chief of Staff for the remainder of the Civil War when Ulysses S. Grant was appointed to that position.

Early in the American Civil War, Halleck was a senior Union Army commander in the Western Theater. He commanded operations in the West from 1861 until 1862, during which time, while the Union armies in the East were repeatedly defeated and held back, the troops under Halleck's command won many important victories. However, Halleck was not present at those battles, and his subordinates earned most of the recognition. The only operation in which Halleck exercised field command was the so-called siege of Corinth in the spring of 1862, a Union victory which he conducted with unnecessary caution, which allowed the Confederate force to escape. Halleck also developed rivalries with several of his subordinate generals, such as Grant and Don Carlos Buell. In July 1862, following Major General George B. McClellan's failed Peninsula Campaign in the Eastern Theater, Halleck was promoted to general-in-chief. Halleck served in this capacity for about a year and a half.

Halleck was a cautious general who believed strongly in thorough preparations for battle and in the value of defensive fortifications over quick, aggressive action. He was a master of administration, logistics, and the politics necessary at the top of the military hierarchy, but exerted little effective control over field operations from his post in Washington, D.C. As general-in-chief he refused to give orders to his subordinate commanders, instead offering advice, but leaving the final decisions up to the generals in the field. As a result, his subordinates frequently criticized him and often ignored his instructions. Still, Halleck's earlier contributions to military theory are credited with encouraging a new spirit of professionalism in the army.

In March 1864, Grant was promoted to general-in-chief, locating his headquarters with the Army of the Potomac in the field, while Halleck was relegated to serving as chief of staff in Washington, providing the necessary administrative support to fulfill Grant's orders to the various armies. Without the pressure of having to control the movements of the armies, Halleck performed capably in this task, ensuring that the Union armies were as well-equipped and supplied as possible.

== Early life ==
Halleck was born on a farm in Westernville, Oneida County, New York, the third child of 14 of Joseph Halleck, a lieutenant who served in the War of 1812, and Catherine Wager Halleck. Young Henry detested the thought of an agricultural life and ran away from home at an early age to be raised by an uncle, David Wager of Utica. He attended Hudson Academy, Union College in Schenectady, New York, then the United States Military Academy. He became a favorite of military theorist Dennis Hart Mahan and was allowed to teach classes while still a cadet. He graduated in 1839, third in his class of 31 cadets, as a second lieutenant of engineers. After spending some time as a member of the teaching staff at the academy, and a few years improving the defenses of New York Harbor, he wrote a report for the United States Senate on seacoast defenses, Report on the Means of National Defence, which pleased General-in-Chief Winfield Scott, who rewarded Halleck with a trip to Europe in 1844 to study European fortifications and the French military. Returning home as a first lieutenant, Halleck gave a series of twelve lectures at the Lowell Institute in Boston that were subsequently published in 1846 as Elements of Military Art and Science. His work, one of the first expressions of American military professionalism, was well received by his colleagues and was considered one of the definitive tactical treatises used by officers in the coming Civil War. His scholarly pursuits earned him the later derogatory nickname "Old Brains".

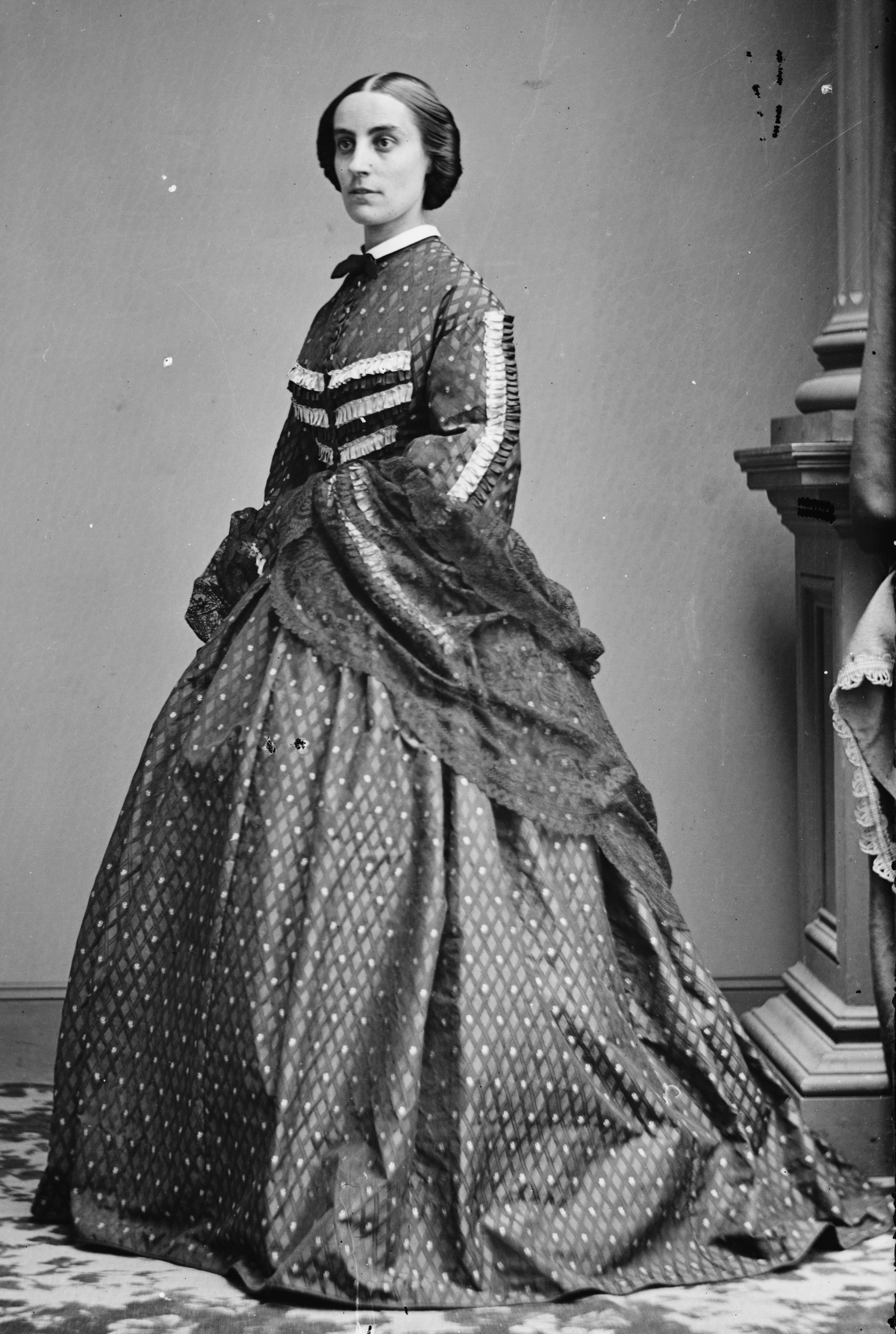
Elizabeth Hamilton

During the Mexican–American War, Halleck was assigned to duty in California. During his seven-month journey on the transport USS Lexington around Cape Horn, assigned as aide-de-camp to Commodore William Shubrick, he translated Henri Jomini's Vie politique et militaire de Napoleon ("Political and Military Life of Napoleon"), which further enhanced his reputation for scholarship. He spent several months in California constructing fortifications, then was first exposed to combat on November 11, 1847, during William Shubrick's capture of the port of Mazatlán, Lt. Halleck served as lieutenant governor of the occupied city. He was awarded a brevet promotion to captain in 1847 for his "gallant and meritorious service" in California and Mexico, and would later be appointed captain in the regular army on July 1, 1853. He was transferred north to serve under General Bennet Riley, the governor general of the California Territory. Halleck was soon appointed military secretary of state, a position which made him the governor's representative at the 1849 convention in Monterey where the California state constitution was written. Halleck became one of the principal authors of the document. The California State Military Museum writes that Halleck "was [at the convention] and in a lone measure its brains because he had given more studious thought to the subject than any other, and General Riley had instructed him to help frame the new constitution." He was nominated during the convention to be one of two men to represent the new state in the United States Senate, but received only enough votes for third place. In 1851, he served as the Judge Advocate for Joseph Hooker's court martial in Sonoma, CA. Hooker had been charged with conduct unbecoming an officer and a gentleman for profiteering off the army. During his political activities, Halleck found time to join a law firm in San Francisco, Halleck, Peachy & Billings, which became so successful that he resigned his commission in 1854. The following year, he married Elizabeth Hamilton, granddaughter of Alexander Hamilton and sister of Union general Schuyler Hamilton. Their only child, Henry Wager Halleck Jr., was born in 1856, and died in 1882.

Halleck became a wealthy man as a lawyer and land speculator, and a noted collector of "Californiana". He obtained thousands of pages of official documents on the Spanish missions and colonization of California, which were copied and are now maintained by the Bancroft Library of the University of California, Berkeley the originals having been destroyed in the 1906 San Francisco earthquake and fire. He built the Montgomery Block, San Francisco's first fireproof building, home to lawyers, businessmen, and later, the city's Bohemian writers and newspapers. He was a director of the Almaden Quicksilver (Mercury) Company in San Jose, president of the Atlantic and Pacific Railroad, a builder in Monterey, and owner of the 30,000 acre (120 km^{2}) Rancho Nicasio in Marin County. But he remained involved in military affairs and by early 1861 he was a major general of the California Militia.

== Civil War ==
=== Western Theater ===
As the Civil War began, Halleck was nominally a Democrat and was sympathetic to the South, but he had a strong belief in the value of the Union. His reputation as a military scholar and an urgent recommendation from Winfield Scott earned him the rank of major general in the regular army, effective August 19, 1861, making him the fourth most senior general, after Scott, George B. McClellan, and John C. Frémont. He was assigned to command the Department of the Missouri, replacing Frémont in St. Louis on November 9, and his talent for administration quickly sorted out the chaos of fraud and disorder left by his predecessor. He set to work on the "twin goals of expanding his command and making sure that no blame of any sort fell on him."

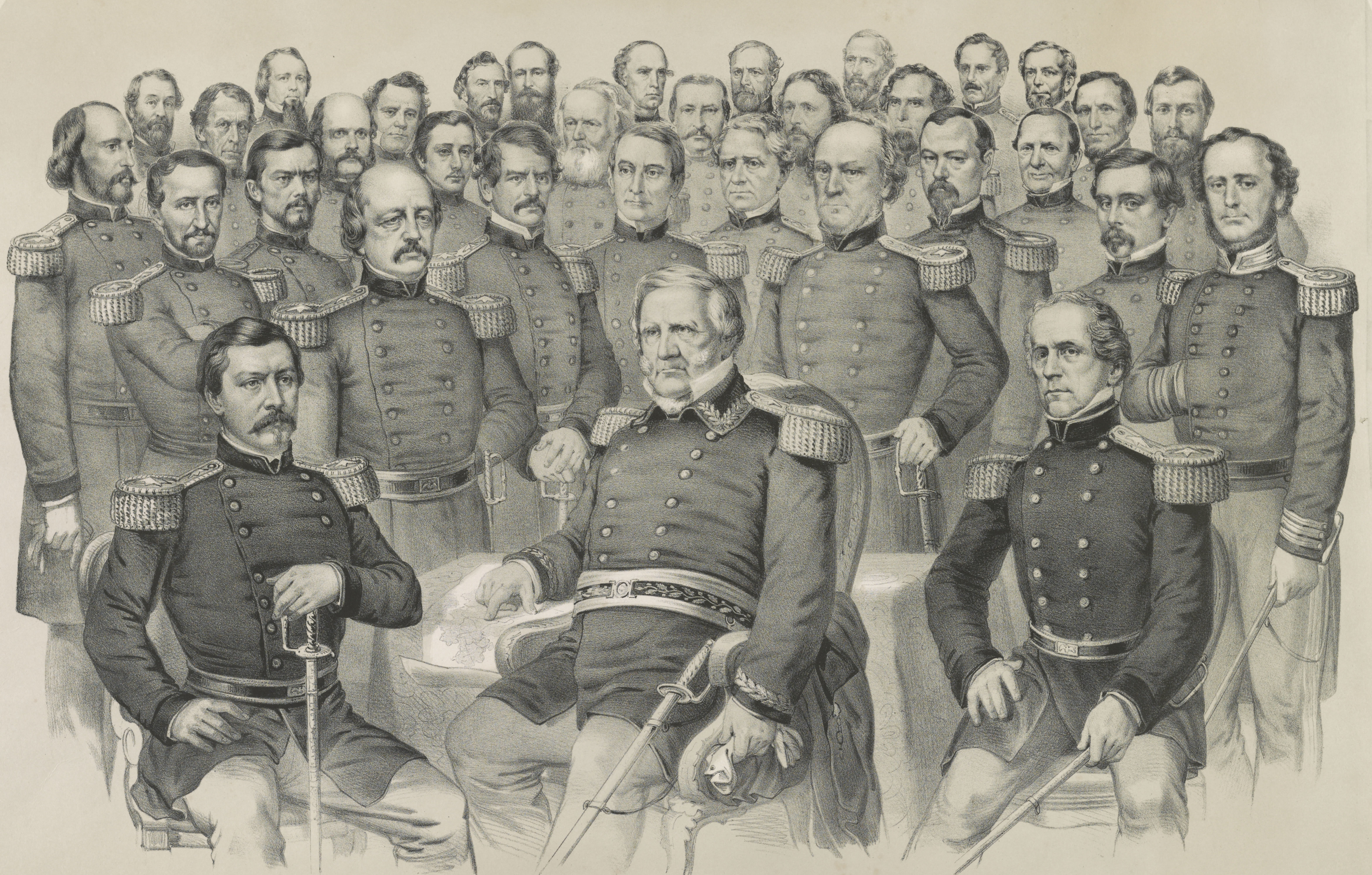
Gen. Halleck in The champions of the Union, lithograph by Currier & Ives, 1861

Halleck established an uncomfortable relationship with the man who would become his most successful subordinate and future commander, Brig. Gen. Ulysses S. Grant. The pugnacious Grant had just been repulsed at the minor, but bloody, Battle of Belmont but had ambitious plans for amphibious operations on the Tennessee and Cumberland Rivers. Halleck, by nature a cautious general, but also judging that Grant's reputation for alcoholism in the prewar period made him unreliable, twice rejected Grant's plans. However, under pressure from President Lincoln to take offensive action, Halleck reconsidered and Grant conducted operations with naval and land forces against Forts Henry and Donelson in February 1862, capturing both, along with 14,000 Confederates.

Grant had delivered the first major Union victory of the war. Halleck obtained a promotion for him to major general of volunteers, along with some other generals in his department, and used the victory as an opportunity to request overall command in the Western Theater, which he currently shared with Maj. Gen. Don Carlos Buell, but which was not granted. He briefly relieved Grant of field command of a newly ordered expedition up the Tennessee River after Grant left his district to meet Buell in Nashville, failed to provide returns of his force, and allegedly did not immediately stop looting at the two captured forts. It was later determined that the requests from Halleck about Grant's force never made it to Grant. Halleck also cited rumors of renewed alcoholism, but then restored Grant to field command – pressure by Lincoln and the War Department may have been a factor in this about-face. Explaining the reinstatement to Grant, Halleck portrayed it as his effort to correct an injustice, not revealing to Grant that the injustice had originated with him. When Grant wrote to Halleck suggesting "I must have enemies between you and myself," Halleck replied, "You are mistaken. There is no enemy between you and me."

Halleck's department performed well in early 1862, driving the Confederates from the state of Missouri and advancing into Arkansas. They held all of West Tennessee and half of Middle Tennessee. Grant, not yet aware of the political maneuvering behind his back, regarded Halleck as "one of the greatest men of the age" and Maj. Gen. William T. Sherman described him as the "directing genius" of the events that had given the Union cause such a "tremendous lift" in the previous months. This performance can be attributed to Halleck's strategy, administrative skills, and his good management of resources, and to the excellent execution by his subordinates – Grant, Maj. Gen. Samuel R. Curtis at Pea Ridge, and Maj. Gen. John Pope at Island Number 10. Military historians disagree about Halleck's personal role in providing these victories. Some offer him the credit based on his overall command of the department; others, particularly those viewing his career through the lens of later events, believe that his subordinates were the primary factor.

On March 11, 1862, Halleck's command was enlarged to include Ohio and Kansas, along with Buell's Army of the Ohio, and was renamed the Department of the Mississippi. On April 6, Grant's Army of the Tennessee at Pittsburg Landing, Tennessee, was the victim of a surprise attack but both sides suffered heavy casualties in the ensuing Battle of Shiloh. With the arrival of the bulk of the Army of the Ohio, Grant and Buell managed to repulse the Confederate Army on April 7. General P. G. T. Beauregard had taken command of the Confederates after General Albert Sidney Johnston died on the first day. Pursuant to his earlier plan, Halleck arrived to take personal command of the massive army in the field for the first time. Grant was under public attack over the slaughter at Shiloh, and Halleck replaced Grant as a wing commander and assigned him instead to serve as second-in-command of the entire 100,000 man force, a job with virtually no responsibilities, which Grant complained was a censure and allegedly akin to an arrest. Halleck, disliking the volunteer generals who ranked just behind Grant, covered up the surprise attack for Grant's sake. Halleck proceeded to conduct operations against Beauregard's army in Corinth, Mississippi, called the siege of Corinth because Halleck's army, twice the size of Beauregard's, moved so cautiously and stopped daily to erect elaborate field fortifications. The army waited so long to begin and their movement was so slow that by the time they reached the city, Beauregard had already abandoned Corinth without a fight, deceiving Halleck into thinking that Confederate reinforcements were arriving by train, when, in fact, the trains were taking away the Rebel army's materiel.

=== General-in-Chief ===
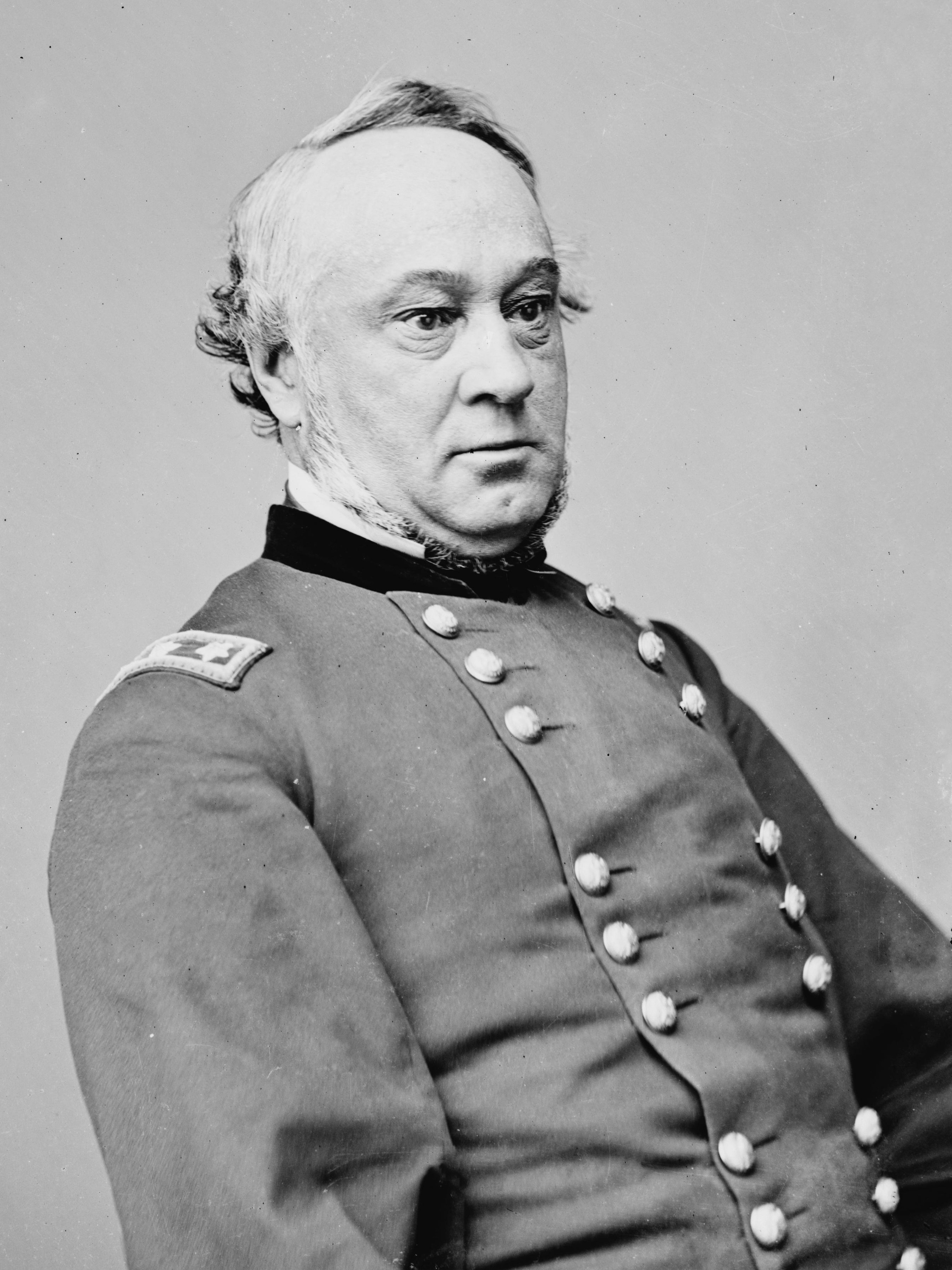
General Henry Wager Halleck

In the aftermath of the failed Peninsula Campaign in Virginia, President Lincoln summoned Halleck to the East to become General-in-Chief of the Armies of the United States, as of July 23, 1862. Lincoln hoped that Halleck could prod his subordinate generals into taking more coordinated, aggressive actions across all of the theaters of war, but he was quickly disappointed, and was quoted as regarding him as "little more than a first rate clerk." Grant replaced Halleck in command of most forces in the West, but Buell's Army of the Ohio was separated and Buell reported directly to Halleck, as a peer of Grant. Halleck began transferring divisions from Grant to Buell; by September, four divisions had been moved, leaving Grant with 46,000 men.

In Washington, Halleck continued to excel at administrative issues and facilitated the training, equipping, and deployment of thousands of Union soldiers over vast areas. He was unsuccessful, however, as a commander of the field armies or as a grand strategist. His cold, abrasive personality alienated his subordinates; one observer described him as a "cold, calculating owl." Historian Steven E. Woodworth wrote, "Beneath the ponderous dome of his high forehead, the General would gaze goggle-eyed at those who spoke to him, reflecting long before answering and simultaneously rubbing both elbows all the while, leading one observer to quip that "the great intelligence he was reputed to possess must be located in his elbows." This disposition also made him unpopular with the Union press corps, who criticized him frequently.

Halleck, more a bureaucrat than a combat soldier, was able to impose little discipline or direction on his field commanders. Strong personalities such as George B. McClellan, John Pope, and Ambrose Burnside routinely ignored his advice and instructions. A telling example of his lack of control was during the Northern Virginia Campaign of 1862, when Halleck was unable to motivate McClellan to reinforce Pope in a timely manner, contributing to the Union defeat at the Second Battle of Bull Run. It was from this incident that Halleck fell from grace. Abraham Lincoln said that he had given Halleck full power and responsibility as general-in-chief. "He ran it on that basis till Pope's defeat; but ever since that event he has shrunk from responsibility whenever it was possible."

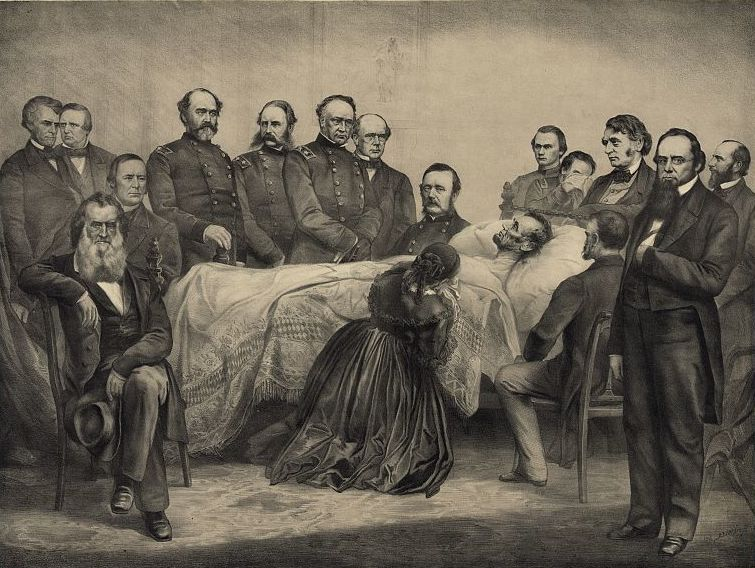
Halleck (standing, fifth from left) was present at the death of Abraham Lincoln

In Halleck's defense, his subordinate commanders in the Eastern Theater, whom he did not select, were reluctant to move against General Robert E. Lee and the Army of Northern Virginia. Many of his generals in the West, other than Grant, also lacked aggressiveness. And despite Lincoln's pledge to give the general in chief full control, both he and Secretary of War Edwin M. Stanton micromanaged many aspects of the military strategy of the nation. Halleck wrote to Sherman in February 1864, "I am simply a military advisor of the Secretary of War and the President, and must obey and carry out what they decide upon, whether I concur in their decisions or not. As a good soldier I obey the orders of my superiors. If I disagree with them I say so, but when they decide, it is my duty faithfully to carry out their decision." However, biographer John F. Marszalek points out that this role was one that Halleck had crafted for himself by his failure to take responsibility and issue orders to his subordinates. Lincoln and Stanton had brought Halleck to Washington to command the Union armies and get results such as he had in the West, but Halleck drew back from the task.

That Lincoln and Stanton were serious in their willingness to cede control to Halleck – after removing McClellan as general-in-chief, the two has performed that role between themselves – can be seen by their behavior with Grant when he came East to take the same role. Although they offered advice and broad strategic goals, they left Grant alone, and Grant took to the challenge in a way that Halleck never did.

=== Chief of staff ===
On March 12, 1864, after Ulysses S. Grant, Halleck's former subordinate in the West, was promoted to lieutenant general and general-in-chief, Halleck was relegated to chief of staff, responsible for the administration of the vast U.S. armies. Grant and the War Department took special care to let Halleck down gently. Their orders stated that Halleck had been relieved as general-in-chief "at his own request."

Now that there was an aggressive general in the field, Halleck's administrative capabilities complemented Grant's field operations and they worked well together. Throughout the arduous Overland Campaign and Richmond-Petersburg Campaign of 1864, Halleck saw to it that Grant was properly supplied, equipped, and reinforced on a scale that wore down the Confederates. Grant had also transferred responsibility to Halleck for oversight of operations outside of Virginia during this campaign. Halleck agreed with Grant and Sherman on the implementation of a hard war toward the Southern economy and endorsed both Sherman's March to the Sea and Maj. Gen. Philip Sheridan's destruction of the Shenandoah Valley. However, the 1864 Red River Campaign, a doomed attempt to occupy Eastern Texas, had been advocated by Halleck, over the objections of Grant and Nathaniel P. Banks, who commanded the operation. When the campaign failed, Halleck claimed to Grant that it had been Banks' idea in the first place, not his – an example of Halleck's habit of deflecting blame.

=== Richmond ===
Following the assassination of Abraham Lincoln, Secretary of War Edward M. Stanton took it upon himself to reassign Halleck to head the Army's department in the defeated Confederate capital, Richmond; by doing so Halleck lost his position as chief-of-staff.

In April 1865, after Sherman exceeded his authority and offered generous surrender terms to Joseph E. Johnston – Sherman apparently believed that he was following Lincoln's desires as expressed at a meeting at City Point, Virginia – it was very badly received in official Washington. Newspapers and officials – including Stanton – began to talk about Sherman possibly being a traitor. Probably to ingratiate himself with Stanton, Halleck took up this position, and instructed other generals to ignore orders coming from Sherman. This enraged Sherman, resulting in a vituperative exchange of letters in which Halleck attempted to explain away his behavior. This caused a rift between Halleck and Sherman, who, up until this time, had publicly and privately lauded Halleck, ever since Sherman had a mental breakdown while he was in charge of the Department of Kentucky, and was transferred into Halleck's department, where he was given the chance to work his way back into being of service to the country.

The rift between the two generals was so strong that when Sherman's army marched from North Carolina to Washington to take part in the final grand review of the Union armies and passed through Richmond, where Halleck was in command, Halleck ordered one of Sherman's corps to pass him in review, an order that an insubordinate Sherman countermanded. Sherman ordered his troops to pass through Richmond "with colors flying and drums beating as a matter of right and not by H's leave." No salute of any kind was offered to Halleck as the troops passed by his house, even though Halleck was standing on the porch.

Halleck, realizing that losing Sherman's friendship was more important to him than gaining Stanton's regard, wrote a letter to Sherman in which he completely humbled himself, but Sherman remained incensed, in particular at Halleck's telling Sherman's subordinates not to follow his orders. He rejected Halleck entreaties, and the two men remained estranged. Still, when Sherman wrote his memoirs in the 1880s he praised Halleck to the extent he thought was deserved.

=== Evaluation by others ===
General George B. McClellan, who, when he was General-in-Chief, appointed Halleck to replace Frémont in the West, said of Halleck:

Of all the men who I have encountered in high position, Halleck was the most helplessly stupid. It was more difficult to get an idea through his head than can be conceived by anyone who never made the attempt. I do not think he ever had a correct military idea from beginning to end.

McClellan told his wife that although Halleck had some good qualities as a soldier, "he does not understand strategy and should never plan a campaign."

Historian Kendall Gott described Halleck as a department commander:

Although he had impressive credentials, Henry Halleck was not an easy man to work for. The nature of his job and his personality often provoked antagonism, hatred, and contempt. Halleck's strengths were organizing, coordinating, planning, and managing. He could also advise and suggest, and he sometimes ordered subordinates where and when to make a move, but he never was comfortable doing it himself. Halleck seldom worked openly, and as a department commander, he was always at headquarters, separated and aloof from the men. His decisions were the result of neither snap judgments nor friendly discussion, but calculated thinking. He was also prone to violent hatred and never cultivated close relationships. Overall, he generated no love, confidence, or respect.

British general and military historian J. F. C. Fuller described Halleck as "a cautious, witless pedant who had studied war, and imagined that adherence to certain strategical and tactical maxims constituted the height of generalship." Fuller approvingly quotes W. E. Woodward's description of Halleck as "a large emptiness surrounded by an education." Fuller also opines that Halleck, after the Siege of Corinth, when he was in direct command of an army of 115,000 men, could have, and should have, crushed P. G. T. Beauregard's army, taken Vicksburg, and occupied Chattanooga, being then in a position to threaten Richmond via the Allegheny Mountains. Instead, by taking so long to move from Pittsburg Landing to Corinth, Halleck allowed the Confederates to escape, then chose to break up his army into small pieces and spread them around the Western theatre. Therefore, according to Fuller, Halleck's being called to Washington by Lincoln to be General-in-Chief was a blessing to the North, because it eliminated from the field a sub-standard general (Halleck) and left Grant free to develop his strategic thinking, and, by taking Vicksburg and opening the Mississippi River, to deal the Confederacy a blow from which it never recovered.

However helpful it was to the Union for Grant to be free of Halleck's supervision in the West, in Washington, D.C. Halleck did not perform well in his role as General-in-Chief. President Abraham Lincoln, growing tired of Halleck's inability to control the Union's generals and make them obey Lincoln's wishes, once described him as "little more than a first rate clerk." Lincoln's Secretary of the Navy, Gideon Welles, who kept a diary throughout the war, said of him "Halleck originates nothing, anticipates nothing to assist others; takes no responsibility, plans nothing, suggests nothing, is good for nothing." Welles later commented that although Halleck was intelligent and educated, he was "a moral coward, worth but little except as a critic and director of operations..." When Jubal Early's army was threatening Washington from the Shenandoah Valley and the city was panicking, Welles described Halleck as contributing to the chaos. He was "in a perfect maze, bewildered, without intelligent decision or self-reliance." Count Adam Gurowski, a Radical Republican Polish émigré who was a minor State Department official, as well as a member of the editorial staff of the New York Tribune, agreed, saying "All the incapacity, all the blunderings are exclusively Halleck's work ... History has not on record military conduct so below any honor or manhood as that of Halleck..."

Secretary of the Treasury Salmon P. Chase, who had begun by being a supporter of Halleck, said during the Siege of Chattanooga that Halleck was "good for nothing, and everybody knew it but the President."

Historian John F. Marszalek, the author of the only complete biography of Halleck – Stephen E. Ambrose's Halleck: Lincoln's Chief of Staff is an expansion of his dissertation – writes:

Halleck saw himself as a subordinate, not a decision maker, a follower, not a leader. This was a deeply felt sentiment, long present in his character, but made conspicuous under the stress of war. ...

Halleck's personality and his performance as a Civil War general were largely the result of deeply ingrained psychological factors and the physical ailments that developed as a result. [His] drive to succeed, his many accomplishments, and his eventual failure to reach his potential all stemmed from deeply embedded conscious and unconscious forces. The powerful man of success was also the tormented child, and, under the stress of war, the torment won out over the power. Indecision became his surrender to, his way of coping with, the turmoil he felt all his life.

== Postwar career ==
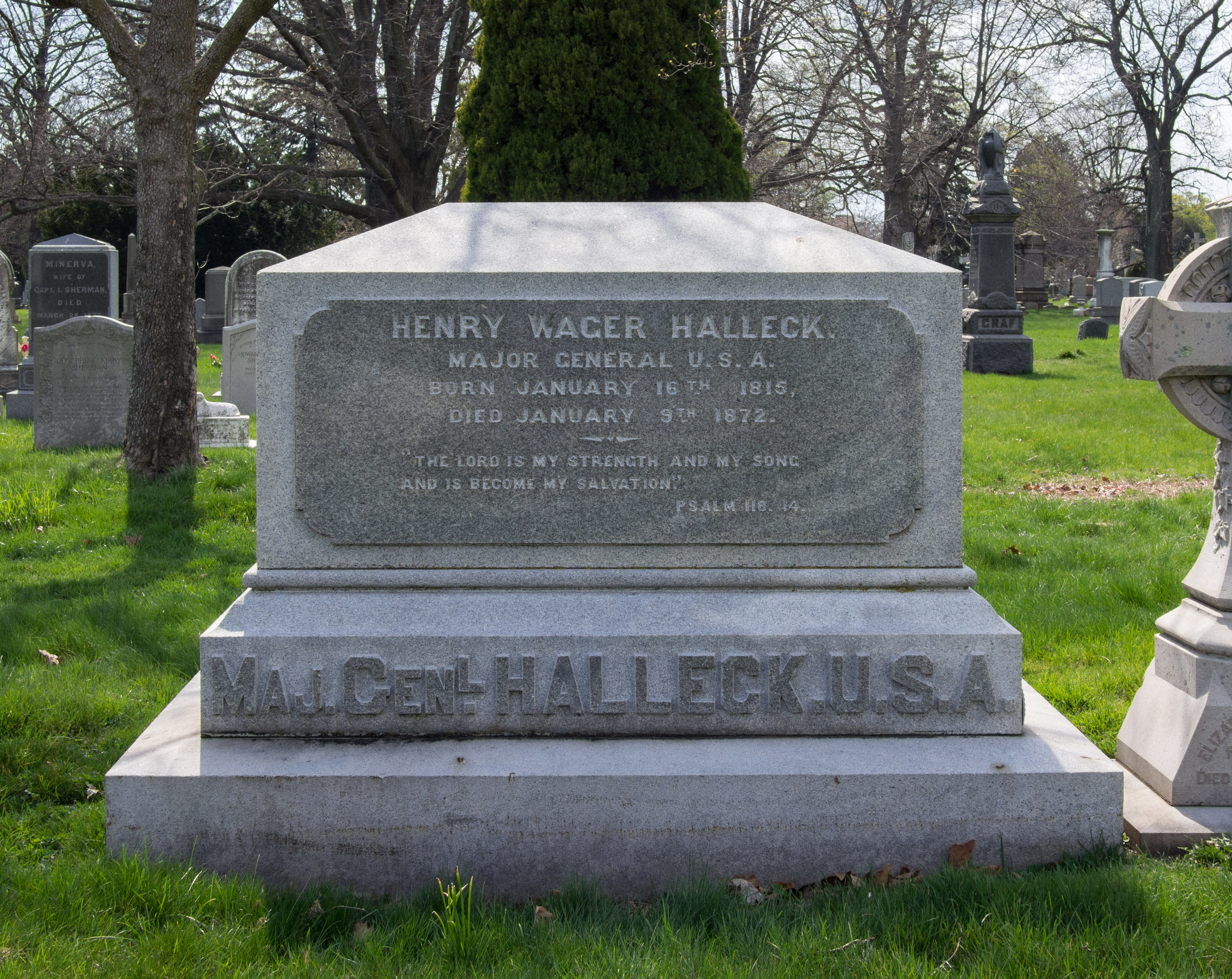
Burial site at Green-Wood Cemetery in Brooklyn, New York

After Grant forced Lee's surrender at Appomattox Court House, Halleck was assigned to command the Military Division of the James, headquartered at Richmond. Prior to that, he was present at Lincoln's death and was a pall-bearer and representative of the military at Lincoln's funeral. In August 1865 he was transferred to the Division of the Pacific in California, essentially in military exile. While holding this command he accompanied photographer Eadweard Muybridge to the newly purchased Russian America (Alaska). He and Senator Charles Sumner are credited with applying the name "Alaska" to that region. In March 1869, he was assigned to command the Military Division of the South, headquartered in Louisville, Kentucky.

== Death ==
Halleck became ill in January 1872 and his condition was diagnosed as edema caused by liver disease. He died at his post in Louisville on January 9, just 7 days short of his 57th birthday. He was buried in the family plot in Green-Wood Cemetery, in Brooklyn, New York, on January 25.

Halleck is commemorated by a street named for him in San Francisco and a statue in Golden Gate Park. He left no memoirs for posterity and apparently destroyed his private correspondence and memoranda. His estate at his death showed a net value of $474,773.16 ($12,759,528.68 in 2025 dollars). His widow, Elizabeth, married Halleck's best friend, Col. George Washington Cullum in 1875. Cullum had served as Halleck's chief of staff in the Western Theater and then on his staff in Washington.

== Family ==
David Wager was Halleck's uncle. Henry Benjamin Whipple was his first cousin, and Charles H. Whipple was his first cousin once removed.

== Dates of rank ==
Insignia	Rank	Component	Date
No insignia	Cadet, USMA	Regular Army	1 July 1835
	Second Lieutenant	Regular Army	1 July 1839
	First Lieutenant	Regular Army	1 January 1845
	Brevet Captain	Regular Army	1 May 1847
	Captain	Regular Army	1 July 1853
	Major General	Regular Army	19 August 1861

== Selected works ==
- (editor) Bitumen: Its Varieties, Properties, and Uses (1841)
- Report on the Means of National Defence (1843)
- Elements of Military Art and Science (1846)
- (translator) A Collection of Mining Laws of Spain and Mexico (1859)
- International law, or, Rules regulating the intercourse of states in peace and war (1861)
- (translator) Life of Napoleon by Baron Antoine-Henri Jomini (1864) published by David Van Nostrand, link from Google books
- The Mexican War in Baja California: the memorandum of Captain Henry W. Halleck concerning his expeditions in Lower California, 1846–1848 (posthumous, 1977)

== Legacy ==
- A statue of Halleck by sculptor Carl H. Conrads is located in Golden Gate Park in San Francisco. On JFK Drive near the tennis courts, it was a gift of Halleck's good friend George W. Cullum.
- Halleck Street in San Francisco near the Presidio.
- Fort Halleck (1862–66): Military outpost in Dakota Territory built to protect travelers on the Overland Trail.
- Halleck, Nevada, an unincorporated community founded in 1869, which took its name from Camp Halleck (1867–1879) – later Fort Halleck (1879–1886) – which was built to protect the California Trail. Both were named after General Halleck. With the closing of the fort and the consolidation of small ranches into larger corporate ones, the town began its decline; it now consists of two buildings, one of which is the post office.
- Halleck Cottage was the name given to one of the homes at the San Francisco Protestant Orphanage (current name: Edgewood Center) in remembrance to a donation made to Mrs. Haight and Mrs. Waller who served as board managers at the time for the San Francisco Orphan Asylum Society (SFOA).

== In popular culture ==
- Halleck is a character in some American Civil War alternate histories, including the novels Stars and Stripes Forever (1998) by Harry Harrison and Gettysburg: A Novel of the Civil War (2003) by Newt Gingrich and William R. Forstchen. In Harrison's novel, while Halleck's role is fairly important, he does not personally appear.
- In the 1941 film They Died with Their Boots On, Sydney Greenstreet plays General Winfield Scott, however, the fictionalized Scott is a conflation partly based on Halleck.
- In 1862 Septimus Winner wrote the march "Gen. Halleck's Grand March".

== See also ==
- Halleck: Lincoln's Chief of Staff
- List of American Civil War generals (Union)

Military offices
Preceded by George B. McClellan	Commanding General of the United States Army; 1862–1864	Succeeded by Ulysses S. Grant
