= Zevely =

Zevely may refer to:

- Zevely, West Virginia
- Lebbeus Zevely, American politician and founder of the Unterrified Democrat
- Eli Marcellus Zevely, American politician and owner of the Unterrified Democrat, son of Lebbeus

== See also ==
- Zevely House
