= Unterrified Democrat =

American newspaper

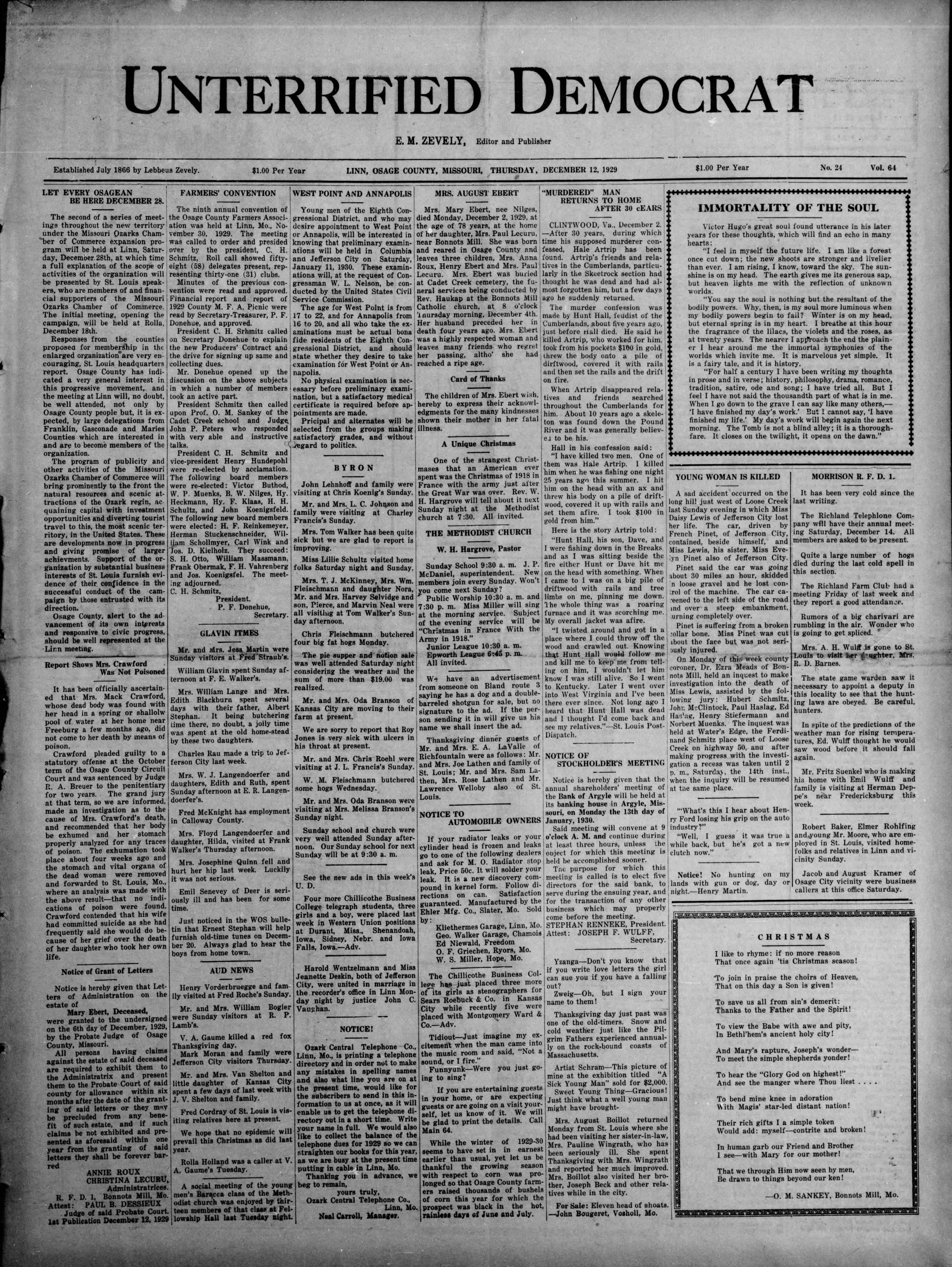
- Unterrified Democrat front page on December 12, 1929
- Type: Weekly newspaper
- Owner: Warden Publishing
- Founder: Lebbeus Zevely
- Founded: 1866; 160 years ago
- Headquarters: Linn, Missouri
- Country: United States
- Circulation: 2500 (as of 2020)
- Website: unterrifieddemocrat.com

The Unterrified Democrat (UD) is a weekly newspaper published in Linn, Missouri, for the city and surrounding Osage County, Missouri. Founded in 1866, it has frequently gained attention due to its unique name.

== History ==
Lebbeus Zevely was a Democratic member of the Missouri General Assembly for Osage County during the American Civil War. In the 1860 presidential election he had supported Northern Democratic nominee Stephen Douglas. Although Zevely had been born in North Carolina and was friendly with many southerners, he opposed the Confederacy. In 1865, Radical Republicans led by Charles D. Drake were able to get Missouri to adopt a new constitution that abolished slavery and required all Missourians sign the Ironclad Oath in order to vote, stripping the franchise from supporters of the Confederacy. Zevely opposed the new constitution, with one source reporting that Zevely declared he was "unterrified" in fighting the new constitution, and the UD reporting that he said "You know, people in Osage County don't lie, and my county was split [between supporters of the Union and supporters of the Confederacy], and at least half my people will be disenfranchised because they won't lie and take the oath", with another member of the assembly then declaring that Zevely was an "unterrified Democrat". In 1866, to better enable him to fight the new constitution, Zevely created the Unterrified Democrat. In its August 18, 1866, issue, the paper declared:

Distrust, dismay, and confusion have enveloped the land, to a greater or less extent, ever since the Democratic Party went out of power, and in our judgment, will continue to do so until it comes in again.

After Lebbeus Zevely died in 1873, the paper was published by his widow, then his daughter Mollie Zevely, then his nephew James William Zevely, and then his brother-in-law Fleming Stratton. In 1900, Lebbeus' son Eli Marcellus Zevely, who had been six when his father died, bought half of the paper, buying the other half in 1910. After his death in 1939, the paper was published by his widow Ida Zevely. Their son William Lebbeus Zevely took over the paper in 1942; Ida Zevely continued to work on the paper until her death in 1958. Under the Zevelys, the paper was a very partisan pro-Democratic paper, even for strongly Democratic Missouri; the paper's editorials were sometimes reprinted minutes from state party meetings. However, Osage County was strongly Republican, which led one of the paper's editors to quit and open up business in, friendlier, strongly Democratic Monroe County, Missouri. For a time, the paper's motto was a quote from Thomas Jefferson: "A jealous care of the right to election by the people", though it was retired by 1955.

After 102 years and three generations of Zevely ownership, the paper was sold to Norman and Mary Troesser in 1969. Norman Troesser had worked for the paper since 1956. William Zevely said "I hated to sell it; hated it down to my bones", but he was a bachelor and his family was disinterested in operating it. Zevely had lost the use of his left arm in a 1954 accident and required assistance for many tasks. He sold the paper to try and convince Norman Troesser to continue working on it. Zevely continued to work at the paper after selling it and died in 1974. Norman Troesser noted how he would always endorse Democrats who he knew and could say something nice about, staying silent otherwise.

In 1979, the Troessers sold the paper to WNBC-TV anchorman Jack Cafferty, Columbia Daily Tribune reporter Donald Keough, and Osage County prosecutor and former KMMJ radio director Bradley Lockenvitz. In May 1980, Lockenvitz bought out the other owners; he said he did so because he wanted to "keep the paper in the hands of a Democrat". Lockenvitz said that he put lots of money into the paper to repay its debts and that his legal career prevented him from taking an active role in its daily operation. In September, Lockenvitz sold the paper to Ralph and Jerrilyn "Jerry" Voss, who had owned the Osage County Observer since 1969. Lockenvitz said "as much as I want to keep the U.D. in Democratic hands, I can no longer sacrifice the financial well-being of my family to support the paper." He reserved the right to put tabloid inserts in the paper, planning to insert them around elections, and regretted that a deal to give him a commentary section had not been reached. Jerry Voss said she initially wanted to change the paper's name but that her husband had talked her out of it; they merged the Observer into the UD.

In the 1980 presidential election – weeks after it had been acquired by the Vosses – the UD gave a brief endorsement to Republican nominee Ronald Reagan, the first time in its history that it had endorsed a Republican for president. In the 1984 presidential election, the paper gave an enthusiastic endorsement to Reagan. Jerry Voss said that she thought Lebbeus Zevely would have approved, praising Reagan for making people "proud to be American" and criticizing the Democratic Party as "the party of the gays [and] the welfare types". On the party's ticket, she would say that "Everybody's who's looking for a handout is looking to [presidential nominee] Walter Mondale", and that the selection of Geraldine Ferraro as vice-presidential nominee, marking the first time a major-party nominated a woman, was "tokenism run rampant". Voss would identify herself as a Republican.

In 2007, Ralph Voss wrote a column in the UD where he advocated for school vouchers and said that liberals had run the public school system so poorly that it would be indistinguishable from a system designed by the Ku Klux Klan to sabotage Black children. In 2012, Voss' column gained widespread notice when the multimillionaire Republican donor Rex Sinquefield referenced the column to say that the Klan had, in fact, created the public school system to sabotage Black children. Voss' column was criticized by Democratic State Representative Chris Kelly as "silly and easily refutable but not racist". James D. Evans, President of Lindenwood University (where Sinquefield made the claim), criticized Voss' column as derogatory and did not criticize Sinquefield. Sinquefield's remarks were widely ridiculed and he apologized for "my reference to a quote from Ralph Voss of the Unterrified Democrat."

In 2018, the Vosses sold the paper to Warden Publishing, which had owned the nearby Gasconade County Republican since 1963.
