= Henry Winter Davis =

American politician (1817–1865)

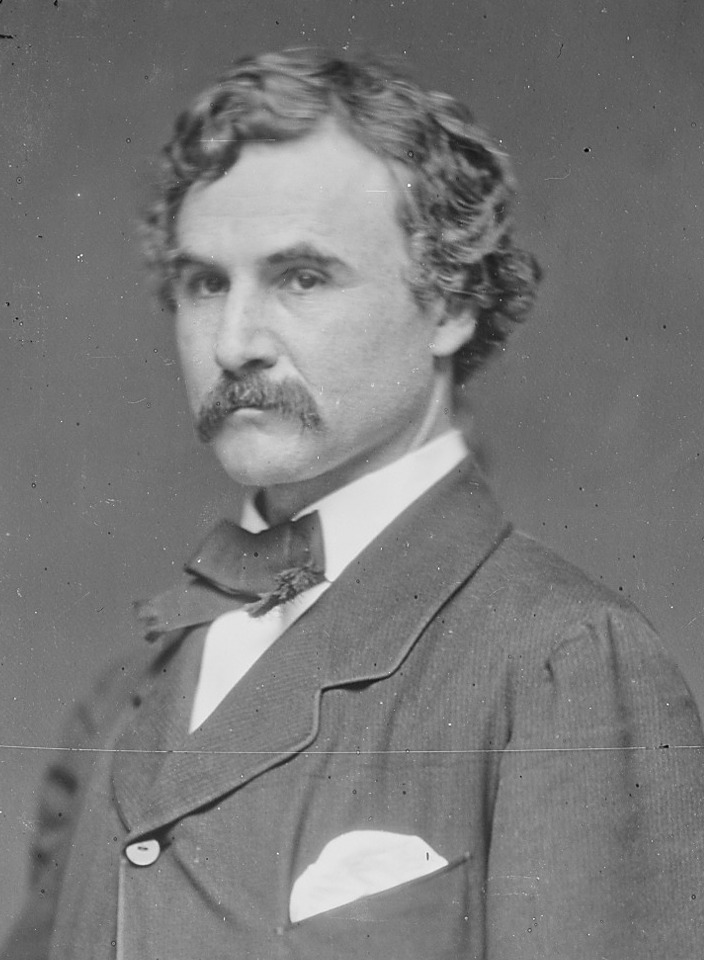
- c. 1860–1865

Member of the U.S. House of Representatives from Maryland
- In office March 4, 1855 – March 3, 1861
- Preceded by: William Thomas Hamilton
- Succeeded by: Henry May
- Constituency: 4th district
- In office March 4, 1863 – March 3, 1865
- Preceded by: Cornelius Lawrence Ludlow Leary
- Succeeded by: Charles Edward Phelps
- Constituency: 3rd district

Personal details
- Born: August 16, 1817 Annapolis, Maryland, U.S.
- Died: December 30, 1865 (aged 48) Baltimore, Maryland, U.S.
- Party: Whig (before 1855); Know Nothing (1855–60); Union (1861–63); Unconditional Union (1863–65)
- Education: Kenyon College; University of Virginia

Henry Winter Davis (August 16, 1817 – December 30, 1865) was a United States representative from the 4th and 3rd congressional districts of Maryland, well known as one of the Radical Republicans during the Civil War. He was the driving force behind the abolition of slavery in Maryland in 1864, and it was largely because of him that Maryland did not secede. He was an author and primary sponsor of the failed Wade–Davis Bill of 1864, which President Abraham Lincoln vetoed for going beyond his plans for Reconstruction.

== Early life and career ==
Henry Winter Davis was born in Annapolis, Maryland, on August 16, 1817. His father, the Reverend Henry Lyon Davis (1775–1836), was a prominent Maryland Episcopal clergyman, and was for some years president of St John's College at Annapolis. The son graduated at Kenyon College at Gambier, Ohio in 1837, and from the law department of the University of Virginia in 1841, and began the practice of law in Alexandria, Virginia, but in 1850 removed to Baltimore, Maryland, where he won a high position at the bar.

He wrote an elaborate political work entitled The War of Ormuzd and Ahriman in the Nineteenth Century (1853), in which he described the American Republic and the Russian Empire as the ultimate opponents in the struggles of humanity; it also dismissed the Southern contention that slavery was a divine institution.

== Career in Congress ==
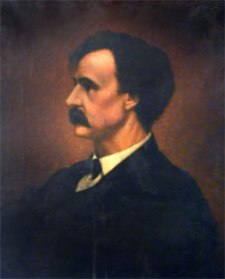
Henry Winter Davis

Early becoming imbued with strong anti-slavery views, though by inheritance he was himself a slaveholder. He began political life as a Whig. After the Whig Party disintegrated, he became a Know Nothing, and served as a member of the Know Nothing–influenced American Party in the House of Representatives from 1855 to 1861. In 1856 he told Congress the unamerican Irish Catholic immigrants were to blame for the election of Democrat James Buchanan, stating:

The recent election has developed in an aggravated form every evil against which the American party protested. Foreign allies have decided the government of the country -- men naturalized in thousands on the eve of the election. Again in the fierce struggle for supremacy, men have forgotten the ban which the Republic puts on the intrusion of religious influence on the political arena. These influences have brought vast multitudes of foreign-born citizens to the polls, ignorant of American interests, without American feelings, influenced by foreign sympathies, to vote on American affairs; and those votes have, in point of fact, accomplished the present result.

In the contest over the speakership at the opening of the 36th United States Congress in 1859 he voted with the Republicans, incurring a vote of censure from the Maryland Legislature, which called upon him to resign.

In the 1860 presidential election, not yet ready to become a Republican, he declined to be a candidate for the Republican nomination for Vice President of the United States, instead supported the Constitutional Union ticket of John Bell and Edward Everett. Defeated that year for reelection to Congress, in the winter of 1860 and 1861―between the secession of some Southern states and the beginning of the Civil War with the assault on Fort Sumter―Davis was involved in compromise measures.

After Abraham Lincoln was elected and the Civil War began, Davis emerged as the leader of Maryland's Unconditional Unionists. He was re-elected in 1862 to the U.S. House of Representatives and quickly aligned himself with the Radical Republicans.

From December 1863 to March 1865 Davis served as chairman of the Committee on Foreign Affairs. In 1864, unwilling to leave the delicate questions concerning the French intervention in Mexico entirely in the hands of President Lincoln and Secretary of State William H. Seward, Davis brought in a report very hostile to France, which was adopted by the House but not by the Senate.

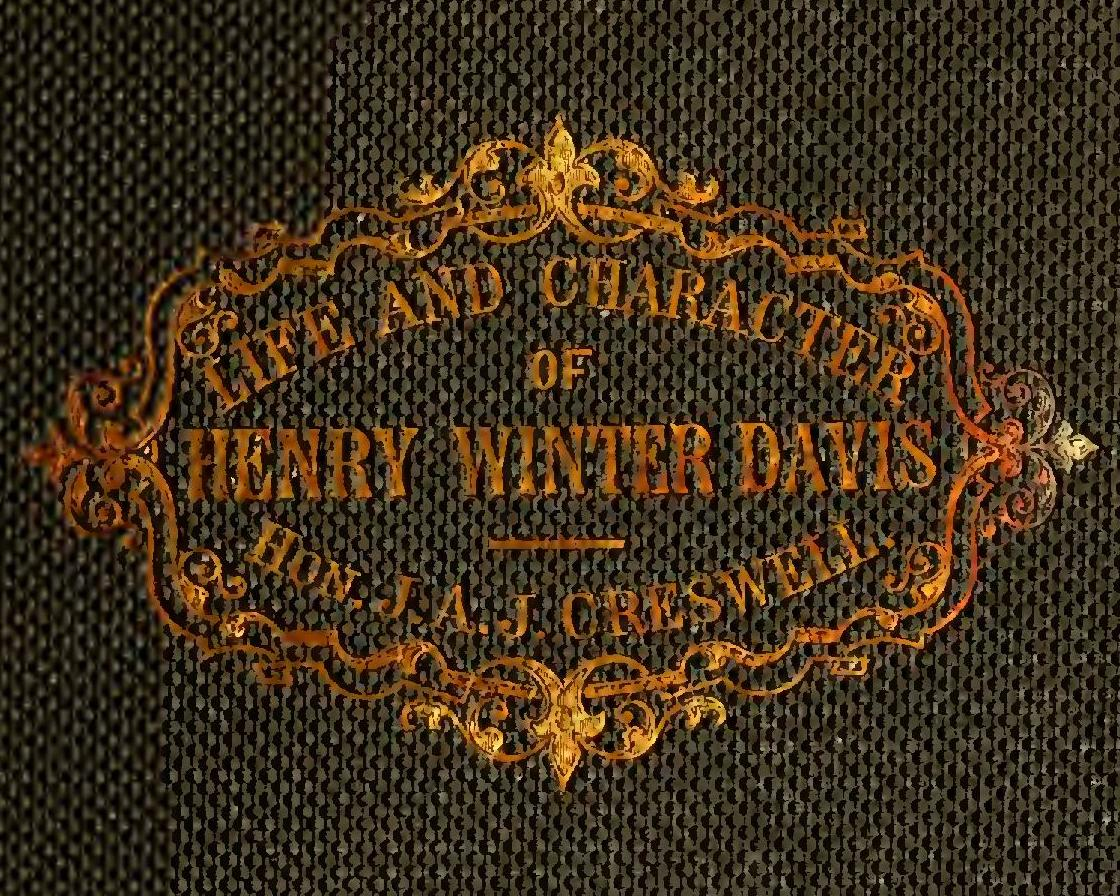
Oration on the life and character of Henry Winter Davis book of 1866

With other congressional Radicals, Davis was a bitter opponent of Lincoln's plan for the Reconstruction of the Southern states, which he thought too lenient. On February 15, 1864, he reported from committee a bill (known as the Wade–Davis Bill, after Davis and Senator Benjamin Wade) which would place the process of Reconstruction under the control of Congress, and stipulated that the Confederate states, as a condition of being re-admitted to the Union, would disfranchise all important civil and military officers of the Confederacy, abolish slavery, and repudiate all debts incurred by or with the sanction of the Confederate government. In his speech supporting this measure, Davis declared that until Congress should recognize a government established under its auspices, there was no government in the rebel states save the authority of Congress. The bill, the first formal expression by Congress with regard to Reconstruction, did not pass both Houses until the closing hours of the session, on July 2, 1864.

President Lincoln disapproved of the bill, and as he did not sign it, it did not become law; on July 8, Lincoln issued a proclamation defining his position. Soon afterward, on August 4, 1864, Davis joined Senator Benjamin Wade of Ohio, who had piloted the bill through the Senate, in issuing a manifesto, "To the Supporters of the Government," which violently denounced President Lincoln for encroaching on the domain of Congress and insinuated that the presidential policy would leave slavery unimpaired in the reconstructed states.

In a debate in Congress some months later he declared, "When I came into Congress ten years ago this was a government of law. I have lived to see it a government of personal will." He was one of the radical leaders who preferred John C. Frémont to Lincoln in the 1864 election, but subsequently withdrew his opposition and supported the President for re-election. He early favored the enlistment of African-Americans, and in July 1865 publicly advocated the extension of the suffrage to them. He was not a candidate for re-election to Congress in 1864. On Election Night, 1864, during a discussion, Lincoln said: "It has seemed to me recently that Winter Davis was growing more sensible to his own true interests and has ceased wasting his time by attacking me. I hope for his own good he has. He has been very malicious against me but has only injured himself by it. His conduct has been very strange to me. I came here, his friend, wishing to continue so. I had heard nothing but good of him; he was the cousin of my intimate friend Judge Davis. But he had scarcely been elected when I began to learn of his attacking me on all possible occasions."

Davis died in Baltimore on December 30, 1865. His remains were interred in Greenmount Cemetery.

Henry W. Davis was a cousin of David Davis, an Associate Justice of the Supreme Court of the United States and later a U.S. Senator from Illinois. He was also a first cousin of Brevet Brigadier General Moses B. Walker who served as an associate justice of the Texas Supreme Court.

== See also ==
- Anna Ella Carroll
- James Morrison Harris
- Thomas Holliday Hicks
- Henry William Hoffman
- Anthony Kennedy
- John Pendleton Kennedy
- Cornelius Leary
- Plug Uglies
- James Barroll Ricaud
- Rip Raps
- Edwin Hanson Webster

== Bibliography ==
- The Speeches of Henry Winter Davis (New York, 1867), to which is prefixed an oration on his life and character delivered in the House of Representatives by Senator John A. J. Creswell of Maryland.
- Tracy Matthew Melton, Hanging Henry Gambrill: The Violent Career of Baltimore's Plug Uglies, 1854-1860, Baltimore: Maryland Historical Society (2005). Details political activities in Davis' district during his tenure as an American Party congressman. A great deal of information on Davis is included in the narrative.

U.S. House of Representatives
Preceded by William T. Hamilton	Member of the U.S. House of Representatives from Maryland's 4th congressional district 1855–1861	Succeeded by Henry May
Preceded by Cornelius Leary	Member of the U.S. House of Representatives from Maryland's 3rd congressional district 1863–1865	Succeeded by Charles E. Phelps
