= Albert Nilges =

American politician (1929–2014)

Albert J. Nilges

Member of the Missouri House of Representatives

Personal details
- Born: March 14, 1929 Linn, Missouri
- Died: October 10, 2014 (aged 85)
- Party: Democratic

Albert J. Nilges (March 14, 1929 – October 10, 2014) was an American politician who served in the Missouri House of Representatives.

== Career ==
He was first elected to the Missouri House of Representatives in 1972. Nilges was raised in Linn, Missouri, and graduated from Linn High School in 1947. Between 1948 and 1952, he served in the U.S. Air Force. He was stationed at Guam as a radio operator during the Korean War. After serving in the military, he worked with the Missouri Highway Patrol and as an owner of an auto store. He retired from politics in 1992.
