= Lebbeus Zevely =

American politician (died 1873)

Lebbeus Zevely (died April 14, 1873) was an American politician and newspaper owner. He was born in what would eventually be part of the Confederate States of America. A member of the Democratic Party, he supported Stephen Douglas and opposed secession. During the American Civil War, he served in the Missouri legislature and as a colonel in the Missouri Home Guard. He was a staunch opponent of the Ironclad Oath instituted in Missouri's 1866 constitutional convention, which disenfranchised admitted supporters of the confederacy. For this opposition, he became known as an "unterrified Democrat". In 1866, he founded a newspaper, the Unterrified Democrat. His only son, Eli Marcellus Zevely, also served in the Missouri legislature. The Unterrified Democrat remained a family business until it was sold in 1967.
