= Wade–Davis Bill =

1864 bill on readmittance of states to the US

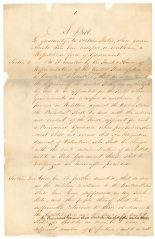
Excerpt of the final version of the Wade–Davis Bill of 1864

The Wade–Davis Bill of 1864 (H.R. 244) was a bill "to guarantee to certain States whose governments have been usurped or overthrown a republican form of government," proposed for the Reconstruction of the South. In opposition to President Abraham Lincoln's more lenient ten percent plan, the bill made re-admittance to the Union for former Confederate states contingent on a majority in each ex-Confederate state to take the Ironclad Oath to the effect they had never in the past supported the Confederacy. The bill passed both houses of Congress on July 2, 1864, but was pocket vetoed by Lincoln and never took effect. The Radical Republicans were outraged that Lincoln did not sign the bill. Lincoln wanted to mend the Union by carrying out the ten percent plan. He believed it would be too difficult to repair all of the ties within the Union if the Wade–Davis bill passed.

== Background ==
The Wade–Davis Bill emerged from a plan introduced in the Senate by Ira Harris of New York in February, 1863.

It was written by two Radical Republicans, Senator Benjamin Wade of Ohio and Representative Henry Winter Davis of Maryland, and proposed to base the Reconstruction of the South on the federal government's power to guarantee a republican form of government. The Bill was also important for national and congressional power. Although federally imposed conditions of reconstruction retrospectively seem logical, there was a widespread belief that southern Unionism would return the seceded states to the Union after the Confederacy's military power was broken. This belief was not fully abandoned until later in 1863. The provisions, critics complained, were virtually impossible to meet, thus making it likely there would be permanent national control over the states formerly in rebellion.

== Legislative history ==
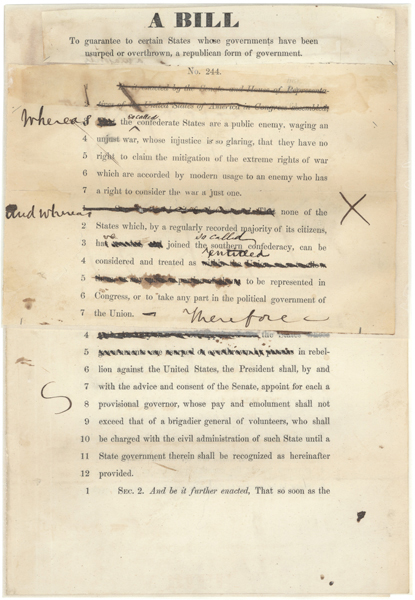
Excerpt of a draft version of the Wade–Davis Bill of 1864

=== House of Representatives ===
The bill was formally introduced February 15, 1864, as H.R. 244. The final vote of the house was 73–59.

=== Senate voting ===
Vote to adopt the measure
February 15, 1864	Party			Total votes
February 15, 1864	Democratic	Unionist	Republican	Total votes
Yea	0	0	18	18
Nay	6	4	4	14
Not Voting	1	1	3	5
Roll call vote on the report: Senator / Party / State / Vote; Henry B. Anthony / R / Rhode Island / Yea; B. Gratz Brown / UU / Missouri / Not Voting; Charles R. Buckalew / D / Pennsylvania / Nay; John S. Carlile / U / Virginia / Nay; Zachariah Chandler / R / Michigan / Yea; Daniel Clark / R / New Hampshire / Yea; John Conness / R / California / Yea; Garrett Davis / UU / Kentucky / Nay; James Dixon / R / Connecticut / Not Voting; James Rood Doolittle / R / Wisconsin / Nay; La Fayette Foster / R / Connecticut / Not Voting; Solomon Foot / R / Vermont / Yea; James W. Grimes / R / Iowa / Not Voting; James Harlan / R / Iowa / Yea; Ira Harris / R / New York / Yea; John B. Henderson / UU / Missouri / Nay; Thomas A. Hendricks / D / Indiana / Nay; Timothy O. Howe / R / Wisconsin / Yea; Henry S. Lane / R / Indiana / Nay; James Henry Lane / R / Kansas / Yea; James A. McDougall / D / California / Nay; Edwin D. Morgan / R / New York / Yea; Samuel C. Pomeroy / R / Kansas / Yea; Lazarus W. Powell / D / Kentucky / Nay; Alexander Ramsey / R / Minnesota / Yea; William A. Richardson / D / Illinois / Not Voting; George R. Riddle / D / Delaware / Nay; John Sherman / R / Ohio / Yea; William Sprague IV / R / Rhode Island / Yea; Charles Sumner / R / Massachusetts / Yea; Willard Saulsbury / D / Delaware / Nay; John C. Ten Eyck / R / New Jersey / Nay; Lyman Trumbull / R / Illinois / Nay; Peter G. Van Winkle / UU / West Virginia / Nay; Benjamin Wade / R / Ohio / Yea; Morton S. Wilkinson / R / Minnesota / Yea; Henry Wilson / R / Massachusetts / Yea

== Lincoln's veto ==
One of Lincoln's objections was to the idea that seceded states needed to "re-join" the Union (an idea that permeated the whole bill). From Lincoln's point of view, states were not constitutionally allowed to secede in the first place, so the ordinances of secession were null and void from the moment they passed. Thus the war was being fought to "compel the obedience of rebellious individuals,” not of rebellious states per se. The language of the bill undermined this argument, as the possibility of Confederate states being “readmitted” implied those states in rebellion were not part of the Union anymore. Moreover, the bill compelled those states to draft new Constitutions banning slavery, which was arguably unconstitutional at the time (as Congress had no power to deal with slavery within individual states).

On a more pragmatic level, Lincoln also feared the bill would sabotage his own reconstruction activities in states like Louisiana, Arkansas, and Tennessee, all of which had passed ordinances of secession but were under Federal occupation and controlled by pro-Union governments. He believed that Wade–Davis would jeopardize state-level emancipation movements in loyal border states like Missouri and, especially, Maryland. The bill threatened to destroy the delicate political coalitions which Lincoln had begun to construct between Northern and Southern moderates. More broadly, it underscored how differently Lincoln and Radical Republicans viewed Confederates: Lincoln believed they could be coaxed back into peaceful coexistence, while Radical Republicans believed the Confederates were traitors and therefore could not be trusted. Lincoln ended up killing the bill with a pocket veto, and it was not resurrected.

== The aftermath ==
Davis was a bitter enemy of Lincoln because he believed that the President was too lenient in his policies for the South. Davis and Wade issued a manifesto "To the Supporters of the Government" on August 4, 1864, accusing Lincoln of using reconstruction to secure electors in the South who would "be at the dictation of his personal ambition," and condemning what they saw as his efforts to usurp power from Congress ("the authority of Congress is paramount and must be respected"). The Manifesto backfired, however, and while it initially caused much debate on the nature of the Reconstruction to come, Winter Davis was not renominated for his Congressional seat in Maryland. Its ideas, particularly that Congress should be the main driver of the post-war process and that the Presidency should be a weaker office (the President "must confine himself to his executive duties – to obey and execute, not to make the laws –, to suppress by arms armed rebellion, and leave political reorganization to Congress"), did influence Congressional Republicans during the following years, however, eventually leading to Andrew Johnson's impeachment trial.

Lincoln survived their attacks and greatly strengthened his position with a landslide victory in the 1864 election, and national passage of the Thirteenth Amendment in February, 1865. He momentarily marginalized the Radicals in terms of shaping Reconstruction policy. After Lincoln's death, Radical Republicans battled President Andrew Johnson, who tried to implement a version of Lincoln's plan. The midterm elections of 1866 turned into a referendum on the Fourteenth Amendment and the trajectory of Reconstruction policy. With the Republicans' victory, Congress took control of Reconstruction. The radicals wanted a much harsher plan, but they did not try to reimpose the terms of Wade-Davis. Instead they implemented the Reconstruction Acts and took control of the former rebel states with the United States Army, which registered black men as voters and barred some former Confederate leaders from running for office.
