= Linn High School =

Public high school in Missouri

Coordinates: 38.4638°N 91.8087°W

- 1212 E Main St, Linn, MO 65051

Information
- Type: Public High School
- School district: Osage County R-II School District
- Superintendent: Bob James
- NCES School ID: 291908001030
- Principal: Erin Sassmann
- Teaching staff: 27.55 (FTE)
- Grades: 6–12
- Enrollment: 317 (2024–2025)
- Student to teacher ratio: 11.51
- Campus type: Rural
- Colors: Red and White
- Mascot: Wildcat
- Rival: Fatima High School
- Feeder schools: Osage County Elementary, Linn Middle
- Website: Official website

Linn High School is the only high school in Osage County R-II School District in Linn, Missouri. It is one of three high schools in Osage County, the other two being Chamois High School and Fatima High School.

== About ==
Linn High School is majority white at 97%. The average ACT is 19.4, slightly lower than the Missouri average of 20.8. The student to teacher ratio is 13:1. 32% of the student body is economically disadvantaged. The high school is currently unranked in national and state rankings.

== Activities ==
- Archery
- Baseball
- Basketball
- Cross Country
- Chess
- Drama Club
- Esports
- Football
- Golf
- Scholar Bowl
- Softball
- Track
- Volleyball
