= Dr. Enoch T. and Amy Zewicki House =

Historic house in Missouri, United States

- U.S. National Register of Historic Places
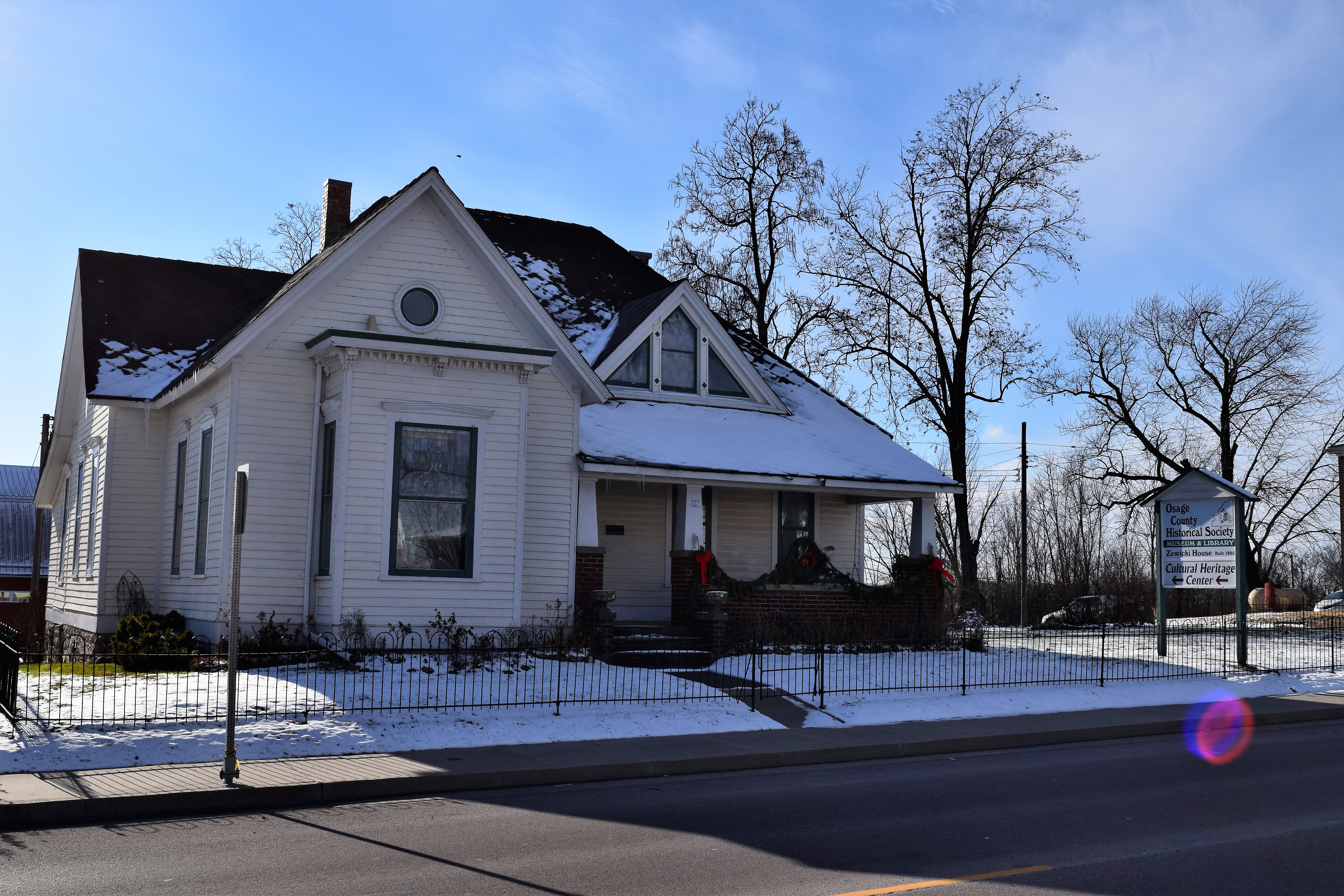

- Location within Missouri Location within the United States
- Interactive map showing the location of Dr. Enoch T. and Amy Zewicki House
- Location: 402 E. Main St., Linn, Missouri
- Coordinates: 38°29′6″N 91°51′2″W
- Area: less than one acre
- Built: c. 1895
- Built by: Oldtmann, Thedore; Laughlin, Samuel
- Architectural style: Late Victorian
- NRHP reference No.: 02000121
- Added to NRHP: February 27, 2002

The Dr. Enoch T. and Amy Zewicki House, also known as the Osage County Historical Society Museum, is a historic home located at Linn, Osage County, Missouri. It was built about 1895, as a typical vernacular Queen Anne frame residence, and it was "updated" with an American Craftsman style front porch in the late 1930s. Also on the property are the contributing frame washhouse and pump and a large frame woodshed.

It was listed on the National Register of Historic Places in 2002.
