= Benjamin Wade =

American lawyer and politician (1800–1878)

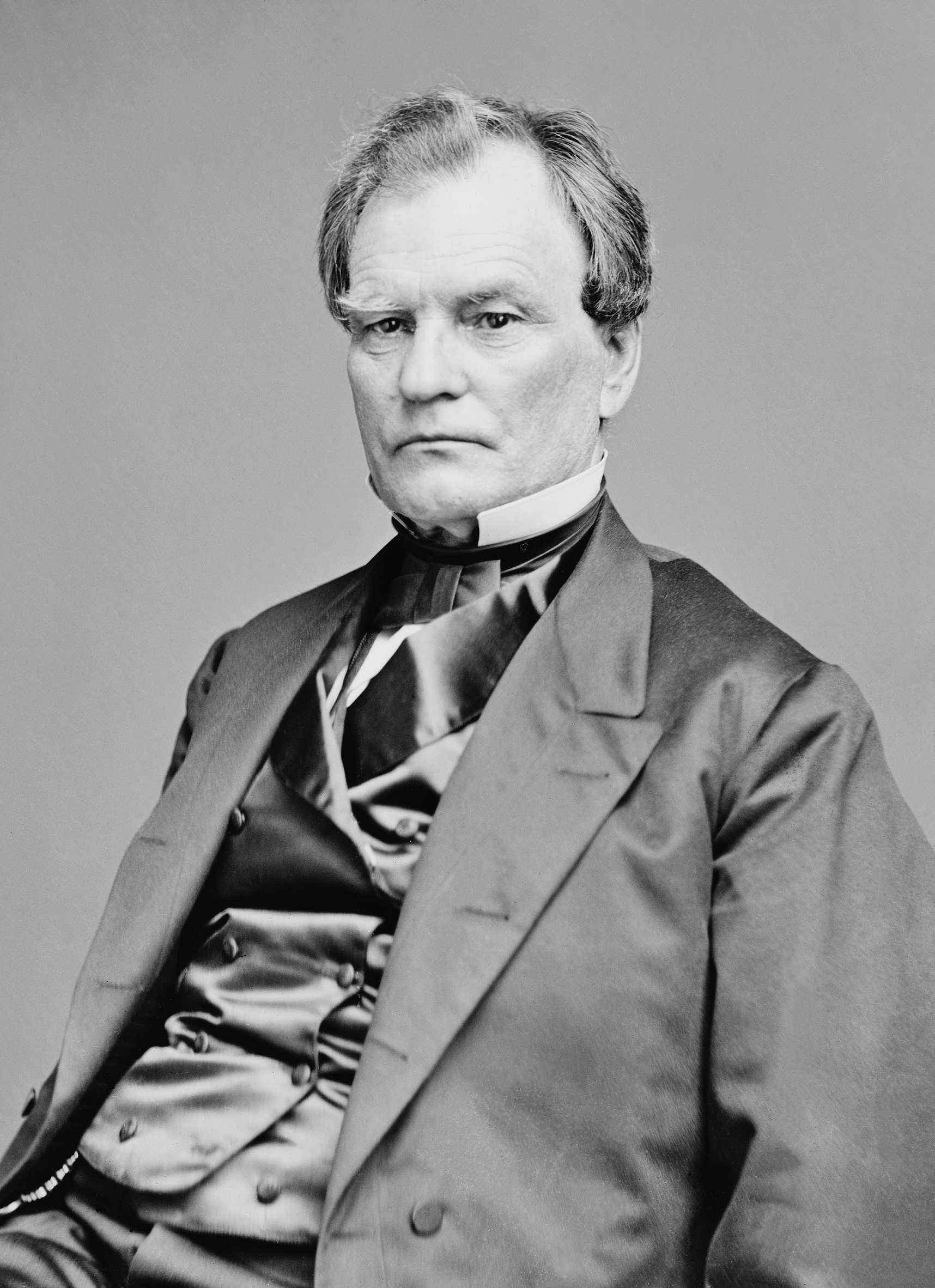
- Wade c. 1855–1865

President pro tempore of the United States Senate
- In office March 2, 1867 – March 3, 1869
- Preceded by: Lafayette S. Foster
- Succeeded by: Henry B. Anthony

United States Senator from Ohio
- In office March 15, 1851 – March 3, 1869
- Preceded by: Thomas Ewing, Sr.
- Succeeded by: Allen G. Thurman

Member of the Ohio Senate
- In office 1837–1842

Personal details
- Born: October 27, 1800 Feeding Hills, Massachusetts, U.S.
- Died: March 2, 1878 (aged 77) Jefferson, Ohio, U.S.
- Party: Whig (Before 1854); Republican (1854–1878)
- Spouse: Caroline Rosekrans Wade
- Profession: Politician, lawyer
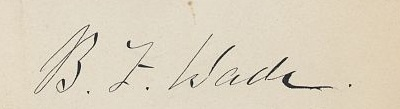
- Signature

Benjamin Franklin "Bluff" Wade (October 27, 1800 – March 2, 1878) was an American lawyer and politician who served as a United States Senator for Ohio from 1851 to 1869. He is known for his leading role among the Radical Republicans. Had the 1868 impeachment of U.S. President Andrew Johnson led to a conviction in the Senate, as president pro tempore of the U.S. Senate, Wade would have become acting president for the remaining nine months of Johnson's term.

Born in Massachusetts, Wade worked as a laborer on the Erie Canal before establishing a law practice in Jefferson, Ohio. As a member of the Whig Party, Wade served in the Ohio Senate between 1837 and 1842. After a stint as a local judge, Wade was sworn into the United States Senate in 1851. An opponent of the Fugitive Slave Act of 1850 and the Kansas–Nebraska Act, Wade joined the nascent Republican Party as the Whigs collapsed. He established a reputation as one of the most radical American politicians of the era, favoring women's suffrage, trade union rights, and equality for African-Americans.

During the American Civil War, Wade was highly critical of President Abraham Lincoln's leadership. In opposition to Lincoln's post-war plans, which he deemed too lenient and conciliatory, Wade sponsored the Wade–Davis Bill, which proposed strict terms for the re-admittance of Confederate states. He also helped pass the Homestead Act of 1862 and the Morrill Act of 1862. In 1868, the House of Representatives impeached President Johnson for his defiance of the Tenure of Office Act; Wade's unpopularity with his senatorial Moderate Republican colleagues was a factor in Johnson's acquittal by the Senate, having been president pro tempore at the time and next in line for the presidency should Johnson be removed from the presidency. He lost his Senate re-election bid in 1868, though remained active in law and politics until his death in 1878. Although frequently criticized for his radicalism during his time, particularly as he opposed Lincoln's ten-percent plan, Wade's reputation has been lauded for his lifelong unwavering and persistent commitment to civil rights and racial equality.

== Early life and education ==
Wade was born in Feeding Hills, Massachusetts, on October 27, 1800, to Mary and James Wade. Benjamin Wade's first job was as a laborer on the Erie Canal. He also taught school before studying law in Ohio with Elisha Whittlesey. After being admitted to the bar in 1828, he began practicing law in Jefferson, Ohio.

Wade formed a partnership with Joshua Giddings, a prominent anti-slavery figure, in 1831. He became the prosecuting attorney of Ashtabula County by 1836, and as a member of the Whig Party, Wade was elected to the Ohio State Senate, serving two two-year terms between 1837 and 1842. He established a new law practice with Rufus P. Ranney and was elected presiding judge of the third district in 1847. Between 1847 and 1851, Wade was a judge of common pleas in what is now Summit County (Ohio).

In 1851 Wade was elected by his legislature to the United States Senate. There, he associated with such eventual Radical Republicans as Thaddeus Stevens and Charles Sumner. He fought against the controversial Fugitive Slave Act and the Kansas–Nebraska Act. After the decline of the Whigs' power, Wade joined the Republican Party. He was also critical of how certain aspects of capitalism were practiced in the 19th century, opposing the imprisonment of debtors and special privileges for corporations.

== Career ==
=== American Civil War ===
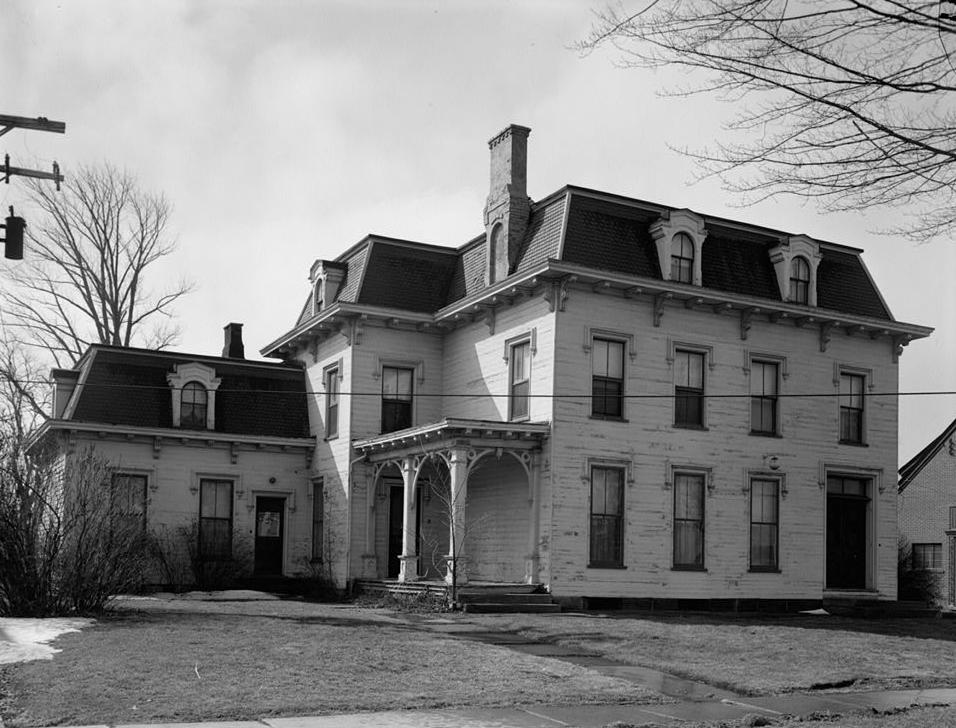
Wade's home in Jefferson, Ohio

In March 1861, Wade became chairman of the Committee on Territories, and in July 1861, along with other politicians, he witnessed the defeat of the Union Army at the First Battle of Bull Run. There, he was almost captured by the Confederate Army. After arriving back at Washington, D.C., he was one of those who blamed the attack on the supposed incompetence of the leadership of the Union Army. From 1861 to 1862 he was chairman of the important Joint Committee on the Conduct of the War, and in 1862, as chairman of the Senate Committee on Territories, was instrumental in abolishing slavery in the Federal Territories.

During the American Civil War, Wade was highly critical of President Abraham Lincoln; in a September 1861 letter, he privately wrote that Lincoln's views on slavery "could only come of one born of poor white trash and educated in a slave State." He was especially angry when Lincoln was slow to recruit African-Americans into the armies, and actively advocated for the bill that abolished slavery and had a direct hand in the passing of the Homestead Act of 1862 and the Morrill Land-Grant Act of 1862.

Wade was also critical of Lincoln's Reconstruction Plan; in December 1863, he and Henry Winter Davis sponsored a bill that would run the South, when conquered, their way. The Wade–Davis Bill mandated that there be a fifty-percent White male Iron-Clad Loyalty Oath, Black male suffrage, and Military Governors that were to be confirmed by the U.S. Senate. The House of Representatives passed the bill on May 4, 1864, by a margin of 73 ayes to 59 nays; the Senate passed it on July 2, 1864, by a margin of 18 ayes to 14 nays and was brought to Lincoln's desk. Wade signed, along with Davis, the Wade–Davis Manifesto, which accused the president of seeking reelection by the executive establishment of new state governments.

On July 28, 1866, the 39th Congress passed an act to adjust the peacetime establishment of the United States military. Wade proposed that two of the cavalry regiments should be composed of African-American enlisted personnel. After strong opposition, the legislation was passed which provided for the first black contingent in the regular U.S. Army, consisting of six regiments: 9th and 10th Cavalry and the 38th, 39th, 40th, and 41st Infantry Regiments. These units, made up of black enlisted personnel and white officers, were not the first of such units to serve on the Western Frontier. During late 1865 through early 1866, companies from the 57th US Colored Infantry Regiment and the 125th United States Colored Infantry Regiment had been assigned to posts in New Mexico Territory to provide protection for settlers in the area, and escort those going further west.

Blunt, outspoken, and above all uncompromising, Wade was among the best known of the Radicals in American politics. He played a major role in founding the new Republican Party, emancipating the slaves, and battling the enemies of the Freedmen's Bureau. Wade thought Lincoln was laggard in battling slavery, but Lincoln proved the better politician, building a deeper coalition in support of policies that would hold the Union together by destroying the economic base of plantation slavery that supported the Confederacy. Later when the groundwork for Radical Republicanism was being laid, Wade contended that under a new economic and social structure in the South shaped by free labor, both blacks and whites would "finally occupy a platform according to their merits." He also fiercely opposed the admittance to representation of Southern states that continued denying suffrage to blacks.

As the descendant of leading Puritans, and an activist in the militant Western Reserve in Ohio, Wade's constituents enthusiastically supported his radicalism. His defeat for reelection in the Senate in 1868 demonstrated that his statewide base was shaky. In addition to his anti-slavery activities, he also fought for land grants, women's rights, and labor reform.

=== Impeachment of Johnson, later years ===
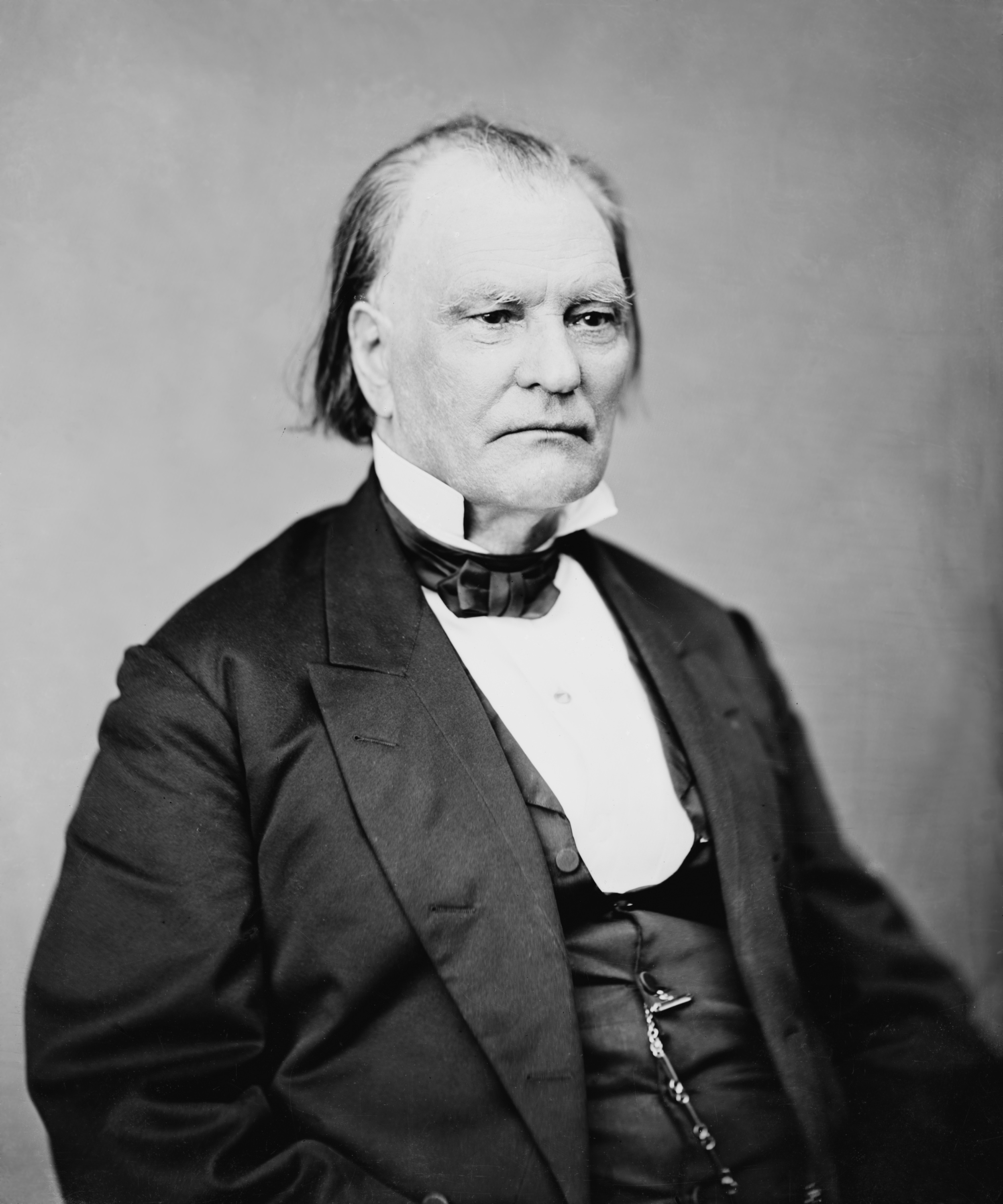
Wade in his later years.

Wade initially expressed optimism in President Andrew Johnson, telling the Tennessee Democrat, "we have faith in you." However, along with most other Radical Republicans, he would become highly critical of Johnson. Wade supported the Freedmen's Bureau and Civil Rights Bills (which he succeeded in extending to the District of Columbia) and was a strong partisan of the Fourteenth Amendment. He also strengthened his party in Congress by forcefully advocating the admission of Nebraska and Kansas. These actions made him so prominent that at the beginning of the 40th Congress (in 1867), Wade became the President pro tempore of the U.S. Senate, which meant that he was next in line for the presidency (as Johnson had no vice president).

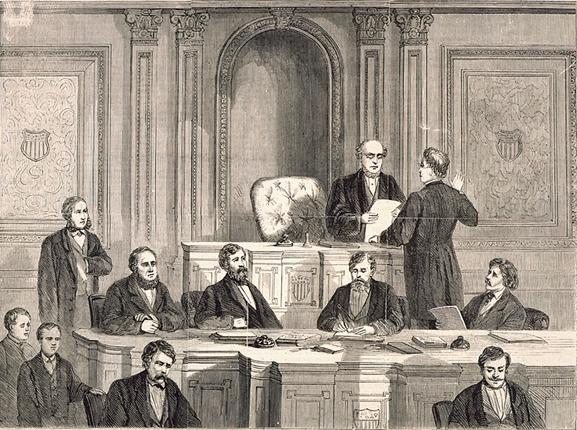
Chief Justice of the United States Salmon P. Chase administering juror's oath to Wade for the impeachment trial of Andrew Johnson

After many fallouts with the Republican-dominated Congress, the Judiciary Committee voted to impeach President Johnson (who had been a Democrat). When Johnson was impeached, Wade was sworn in as one of the senators sitting in judgment, but was greatly criticized because of his unseemly interest in the outcome of the trial. Although most senators believed that Johnson was guilty of the charges, they did not want the extremely radical Wade to become acting president. One newspaper wrote, "Andrew Johnson is innocent because Ben Wade is guilty of being his successor."

According to John Roy Lynch (R-MS, 1873–77, 1882–83), one of the twenty-two African Americans elected to Congress from the South during Reconstruction, in his book Facts Concerning Reconstruction:

It was believed by many at the time that some of the [moderate] Republican Senators that voted for acquittal [of Andrew Johnson] did so chiefly on account of their antipathy to the man who would succeed to the presidency in the event of the conviction of the [sitting] president. This man was Senator Benjamin Wade, of Ohio, President pro tempore of the Senate who as the law then stood, would have succeeded to the presidency in the event of a vacancy in the office from any cause. Senator Wade was an able man … He was a strong party man. He had no patience with those who claimed to be [Radical] Republicans and yet refused to abide by the decision of the majority of the party organization [as did Grimes, Johnson, Lincoln, Pratt, and Trumbull] … the sort of active and aggressive man that would be likely to make for himself enemies of men in his own organization who were afraid of his great power and influence, and jealous of him as a political rival. That some of his senatorial Republican associates should feel that the best service they could render their country would be to do all in their power to prevent such a man from being elevated to the Presidency … for while they knew he was an able man, they also knew that, according to his convictions of party duty and party obligations, he firmly believed he who served his party best served his country best…that he would have given the country an able administration is concurrent opinion of those who knew him best.

Indeed, some of the Moderate Republican senators who voted to acquit Johnson, including William P. Fessenden of Maine, acted out of antipathy towards the staunchly pro-civil rights Wade, who they did not want to become president. Northern business interests also disdained Wade due to his advocacy of labor unions, high protective tariffs, and a "soft" monetary policy.

Wade lost in the 1868 election as the Democrats gained control over the state legislature. Prior to Wade's defeat presidential candidate Ulysses S. Grant was urged by his fellow Republicans to choose Wade as his vice presidential running mate; but he refused, instead choosing another radical, Speaker Schuyler Colfax (presiding officer of the House), who coincidentally married Wade's niece, Ellen Maria Wade, shortly after the election. Wade returned to his Ohio law practice. Though no longer a government official, Wade continued to contribute to the world of law and politics. He became an agent of the Northern Pacific Railroad, continued his party activities, became a member of the commission researching the likelihood of the purchase of the Dominican Republic in 1871 and served as an elector for Rutherford Hayes in the election of 1876.

=== Stalwart politics, antipathy towards President Hayes ===
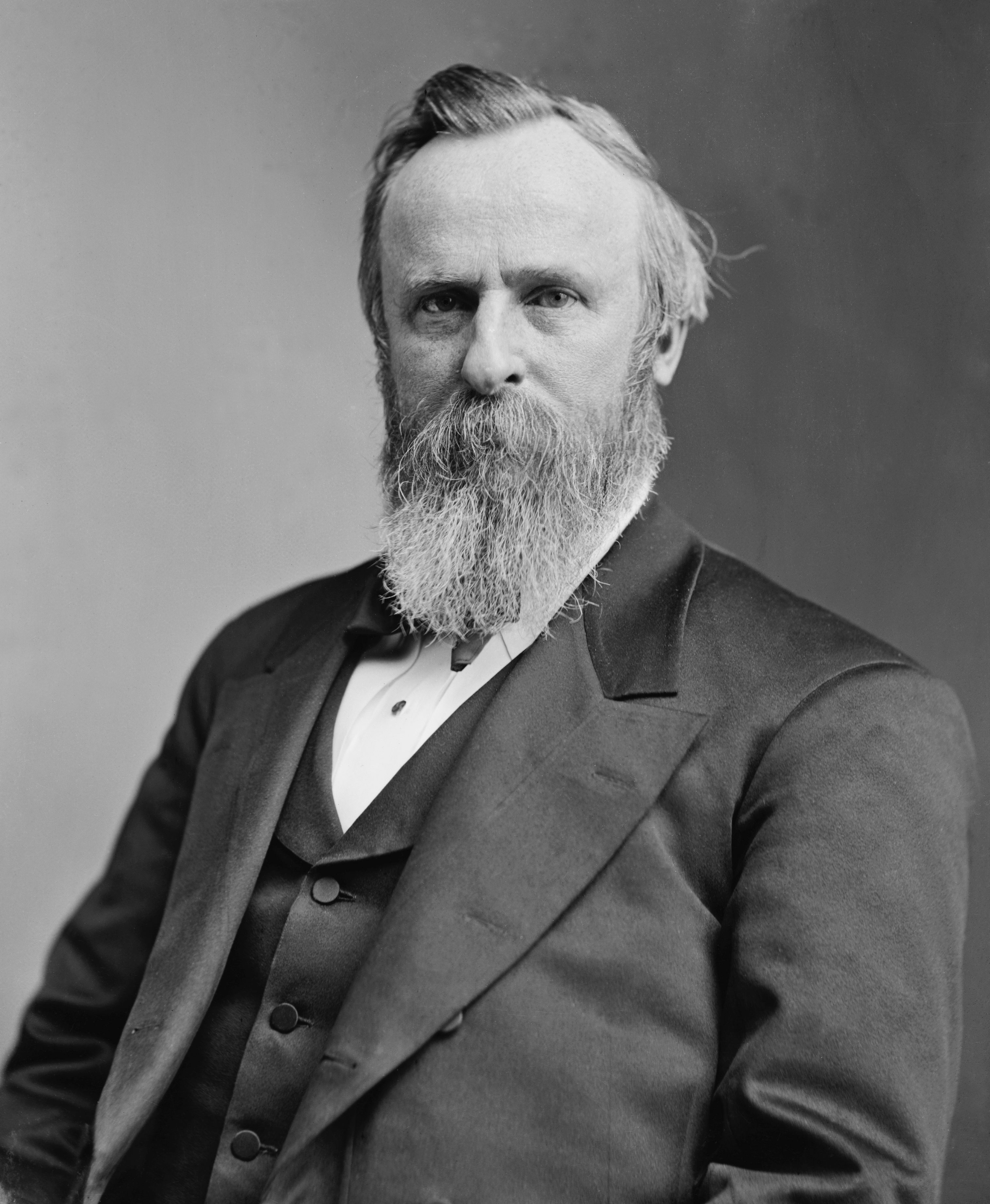
Wade, who maintained lifelong support for civil rights, became disenchanted with President Hayes' leniency towards the South.

Among Wade's political activities in his post-Congress years included his taking part among the Republican "Stalwart" faction, the wing of the GOP which supported the Reconstruction policies of President Ulysses S. Grant and opposed civil service reform during the 1870s. He became a lobbyist for Jay Cooke and the Northern Pacific Railroad in the 1870s.

Although Wade enthusiastically supported Rutherford B. Hayes' 1876 campaign for president, he became disillusioned with Hayes' withdrawal of remaining federal troops from the South, an action he viewed as constituting a betrayal of Republican principles. He wrote in a subsequently published letter to Uriah Hunt Painter of The New York Times:

I do remember it, after what has since transpired, with indignation and a bitterness of soul that I never felt before. You know with what untiring zeal I labored for the emancipation of the slaves of the South and to procure justice for them before and during the time I was in Congress, and I supposed Governor Hayes was in full accord with me on this subject. But I had been deceived, betrayed, and even humiliated by the course he has taken . . . I feel that to have emancipated these people and then to leave them unprotected would be a crime as infamous as to have reduced them to slavery once they are free.

Throughout the summer and fall of 1877, Wade continued his forceful denunciation of the Hayes administration, asserting in November that the president would never have received his vote had he knew Hayes intended to "abandon the Southern Republicans and put in his Cabinet a rebel who had fought four years to destroy the Government." Wade disdained Hayes' selection of David M. Key, a former Confederate officer, to the position of United States Postmaster General. However, Wade's lack of power at this point made him helpless.

=== Death ===
Wade, amidst his expressed frustration and grief over President Hayes' betrayal of the Republican Party's commitment to civil rights, fell ill. His progressively worsening health, attributed by doctors to a form of typhoid fever, would subsequently result in his death. On March 1, 1878, Wade, while lying on his bed, summoned his wife Caroline and whispered his last words:

I cannot speak at all.

In the following morning, Wade died in Jefferson, Ohio. News reporting quickly spread; The New York Times, which had long criticized him frequently, published an obituary titled: "The Last of the Congressional Champions of Freedom."

U.S. Senate
| Preceded by Thomas Ewing, Sr. | U.S. senator (Class 1) from Ohio; March 15, 1851 – March 3, 1869; Served alongside: Salmon P. Chase, George E. Pugh, Salmon P. Chase, John Sherman | Succeeded by Allen G. Thurman |
| Preceded by Lafayette S. Foster | President pro tempore of the United States Senate; March 2, 1867 – March 3, 1869 | Succeeded by Henry B. Anthony |
