= Osage County Poorhouse =

- U.S. National Register of Historic Places
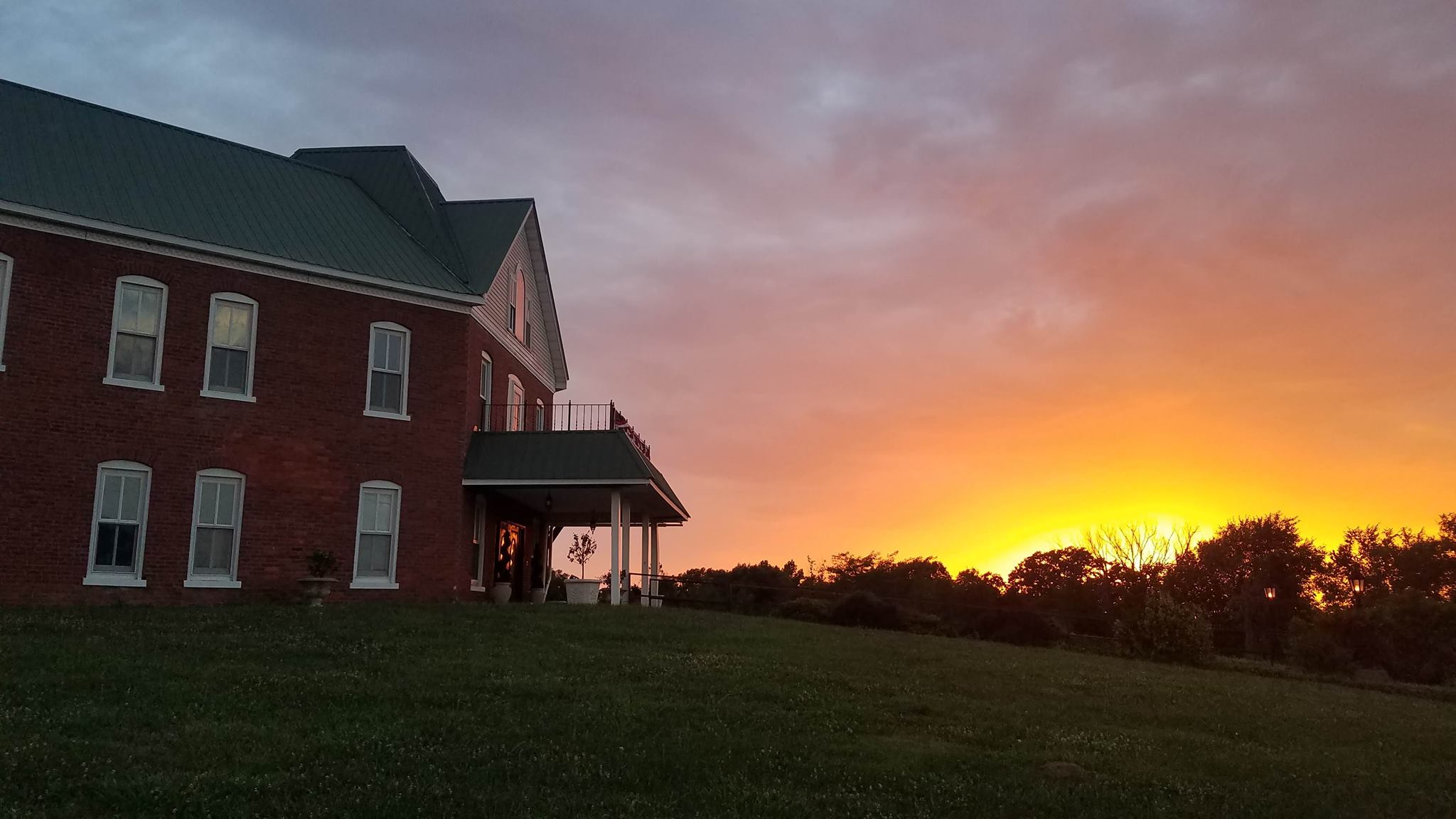

- Location within Missouri Location within the United States
- Interactive map showing the location of Osage County Poorhouse
- Location: Route 621, 0.5 miles (0.80 km) south of Linn, near Linn, Missouri
- Coordinates: 38°28′45″N 91°51′18″W
- Area: 7.7 acres (3.1 ha)
- Built: 1893
- Architect: Miller, F.B.
- Architectural style: Queen Anne, Italianate
- NRHP reference No.: 98000038
- Added to NRHP: February 13, 1998

Osage County Poorhouse is a historic poorhouse located near Linn, Osage County, Missouri. It was built in 1893, and is a 2 1/2-story, V-shaped, brick building with Queen Anne and Italianate style design elements. It has a hipped roof with projecting gable and features original scroll-sawn gable trim, a widow's walk, and a wooden front porch. It was listed on the National Register of Historic Places in 1998.
