= Linn, Missouri =

City in Missouri, U.S.

- City
- City of Linn
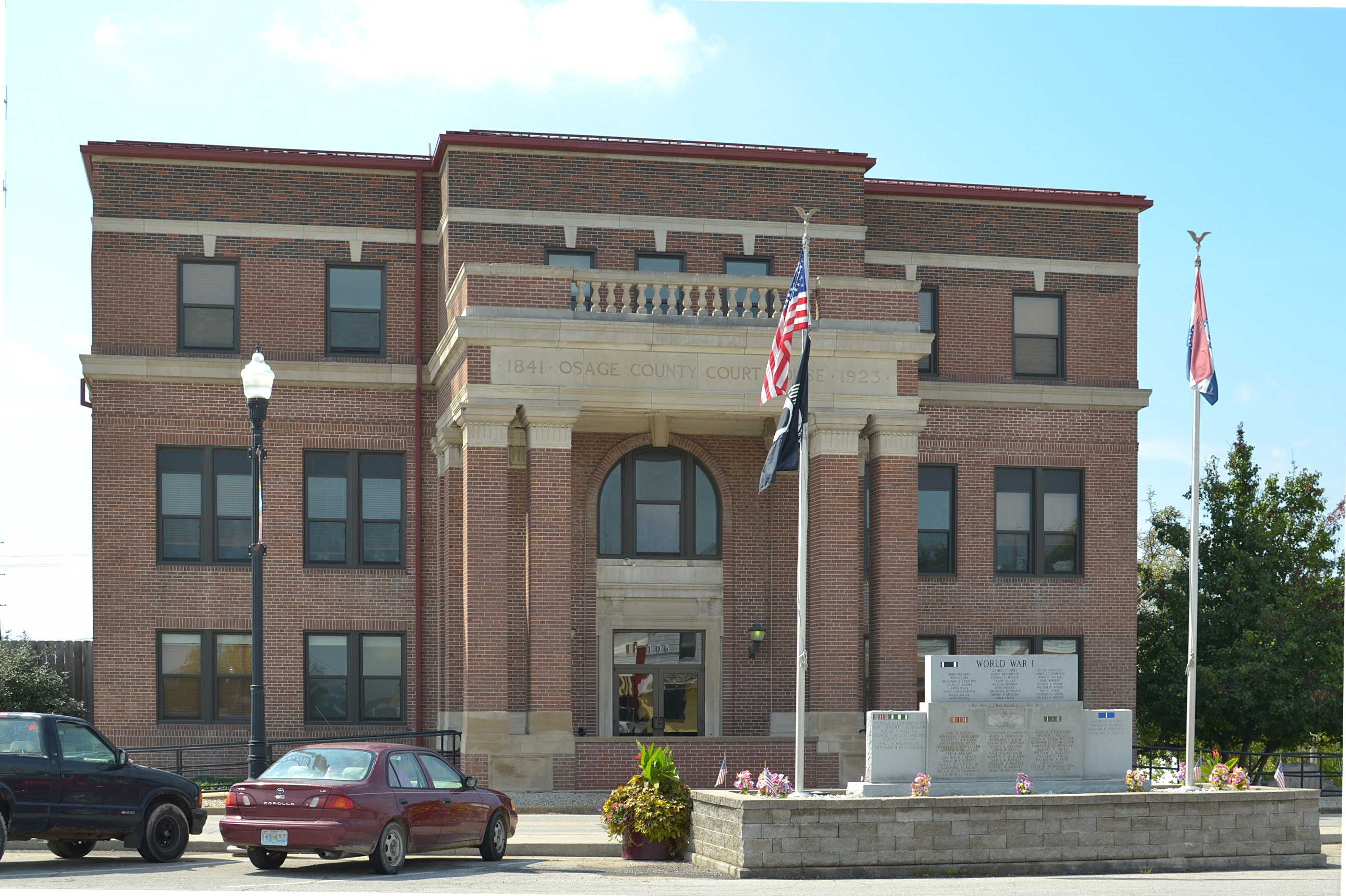
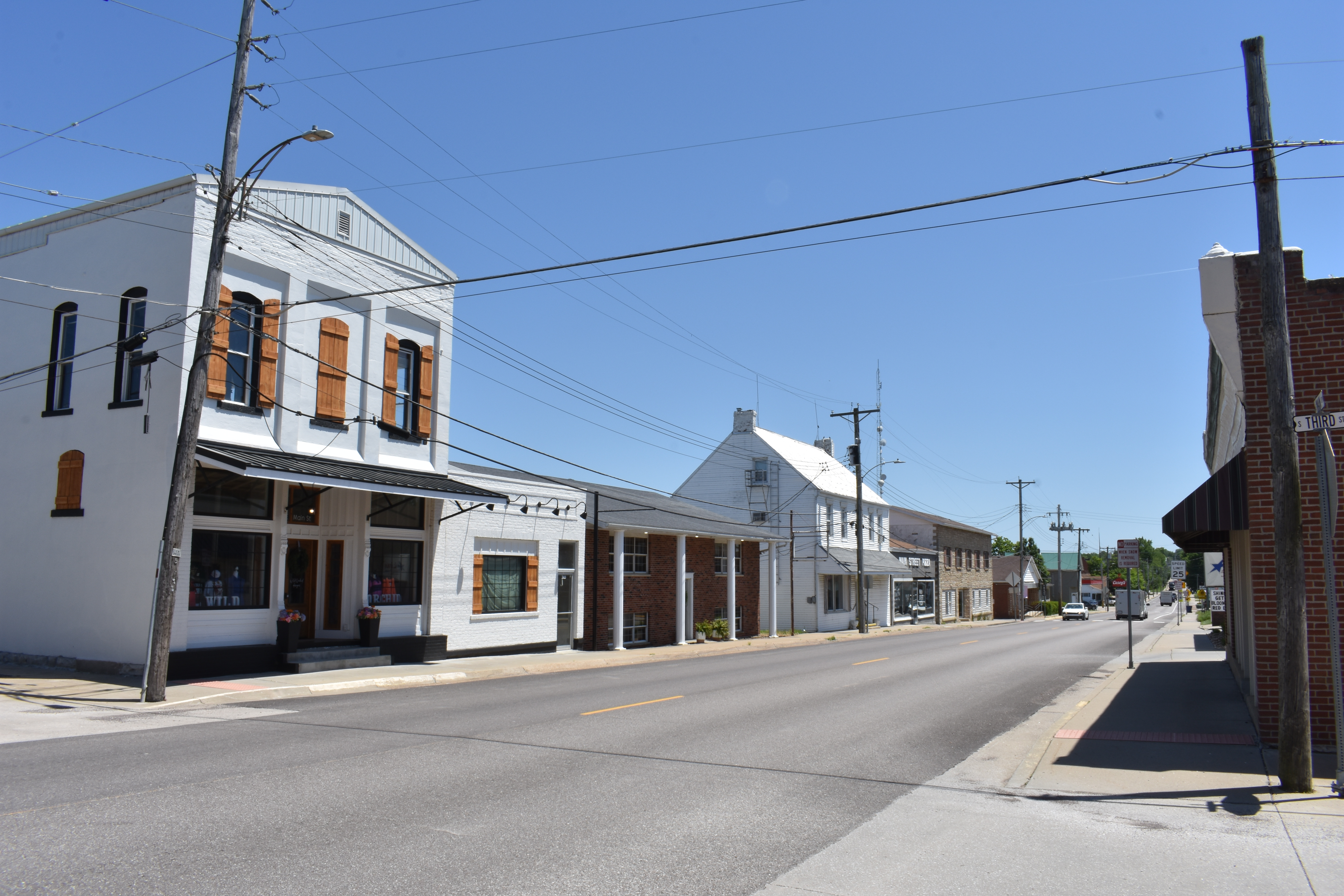
- Osage County Courthouse in Linn Main Street

- Location of Linn, Missouri
- Coordinates: 38°28′44″N 91°50′42″W
- Country: United States
- State: Missouri
- County: Osage
- Founded: 1843
- Incorporated: 1844
- Named for: Senator Lewis F. Linn

Government
  - Mayor: Dwight Massey

Area
  - Total: 1.17 sq mi (3.02 km^{2})
  - Land: 1.17 sq mi (3.02 km^{2})
  - Water: 0 sq mi (0.00 km^{2})
- Elevation: 801 ft (244 m)

Population (2020)
  - Total: 1,350
  - Estimate (2024): 1,440
  - Density: 1,157.8/sq mi (447.01/km^{2})
- Time zone: UTC-6 (Central (CST))
  - Summer (DST): UTC-5 (CDT)
- ZIP code: 65051
- Area code: 573
- FIPS code: 29-43238
- GNIS feature ID: 2395719
- U.S. Routes: U.S. Route 50 in Missouri
- Website: cityoflinn.com

Linn is a city in and the county seat of Osage County, Missouri, United States. The population was 1,350 at the 2020 census. Linn is part of the Jefferson City, Missouri Metropolitan Area.

== History ==
Linn was platted in 1843. The community was named for Senator Lewis F. Linn. A post office called Linn has been in operation since 1844. In 1866, a newspaper, the Unterrified Democrat, was established in Linn.

The Osage County Poorhouse and Dr. Enoch T. and Amy Zewicki House are listed on the National Register of Historic Places. Linn was formally part of neighboring Gasconade County until January 29, 1841.

== Demographics ==
Historical population
Census	Pop.	Note	%±
1900	491		—
1910	532		8.4%
1920	441		−17.1%
1930	555		25.9%
1940	676		21.8%
1950	758		12.1%
1960	1,050		38.5%
1970	1,289		22.8%
1980	1,211		−6.1%
1990	1,148		−5.2%
2000	1,354		17.9%
2010	1,459		7.8%
2020	1,350		−7.5%
U.S. Decennial Census

=== 2010 census ===
As of the census of 2010, there were 1,459 people, 629 households, and 345 families living in the city. The population density was 1,247.0 inhabitants per square mile (481.5/km^{2}). There were 758 housing units at an average density of 647.9 per square mile (250.2/km^{2}). The racial makeup of the city was 97.3% White, 0.4% African American, 1.0% Native American, 0.3% Asian, 0.1% Pacific Islander, 0.1% from other races, and 0.8% from two or more races. Hispanic or Latino of any race were 1.0% of the population.

There were 629 households, of which 33.7% had children under the age of 18 living with them, 37.5% were married couples living together, 13.5% had a female householder with no husband present, 3.8% had a male householder with no wife present, and 45.2% were non-families. 38.2% of all households were made up of individuals, and 12.2% had someone living alone who was 65 years of age or older. The average household size was 2.32 and the average family size was 3.07.

The median age in the city was 30 years. 27.6% of residents were under the age of 18; 13.6% were between the ages of 18 and 24; 26.7% were from 25 to 44; 19.7% were from 45 to 64; and 12.5% were 65 years of age or older. The gender makeup of the city was 51.2% male and 48.8% female.

=== 2000 census ===
As of the census of 2000, there were 1,354 people, 533 households, and 300 families living in the city. The population density was 1,543.3 inhabitants per square mile (595.9/km^{2}). There were 616 housing units at an average density of 702.1 per square mile (271.1/km^{2}). The racial makeup of the city was 97.86% White, 0.22% African American, 0.52% Native American, 0.44% Asian, 0.22% from other races, and 0.74% from two or more races. Hispanic or Latino of any race were 0.96% of the population.

There were 533 households, out of which 30.6% had children under the age of 18 living with them, 42.4% were married couples living together, 9.8% had a female householder with no husband present, and 43.7% were non-families. 34.3% of all households were made up of individuals, and 17.6% had someone living alone who was 65 years of age or older. The average household size was 2.32 and the average family size was 3.01.

In the city, the population was spread out, with 23.9% under the age of 18, 15.9% from 18 to 24, 23.3% from 25 to 44, 15.4% from 45 to 64, and 21.4% who were 65 years of age or older. The median age was 33 years. For every 100 females, there were 96.5 males. For every 100 females age 18 and over, there were 95.4 males.

The median income for a household in the city was $27,656, and the median income for a family was $38,854. Males had a median income of $30,259 versus $20,703 for females. The per capita income for the city was $13,840. About 9.5% of families and 17.1% of the population were below the poverty line, including 16.2% of those under age 18 and 16.3% of those age 65 or over.

== Geography ==
According to the United States Census Bureau, the city has a total area of 1.17 square miles (3.03 km^{2}), all land.

=== Climate ===
The Köppen Climate Classification sub-type for this climate is "Cfa". (Humid Subtropical Climate).

Climate data for Linn, Missouri
Month	Jan	Feb	Mar	Apr	May	Jun	Jul	Aug	Sep	Oct	Nov	Dec	Year
Mean daily maximum °C (°F)	4 (40)	7 (45)	14 (57)	20 (68)	24 (76)	29 (84)	32 (89)	31 (88)	27 (80)	21 (70)	13 (56)	7 (44)	21 (69)
Mean daily minimum °C (°F)	−7 (19)	−5 (23)	0 (32)	6 (43)	11 (52)	16 (61)	18 (65)	17 (63)	13 (55)	9 (48)	1 (34)	−4 (24)	6 (43)
Average precipitation mm (inches)	43 (1.7)	51 (2)	79 (3.1)	100 (4)	130 (5.1)	110 (4.2)	91 (3.6)	94 (3.7)	100 (4)	89 (3.5)	84 (3.3)	66 (2.6)	1,040 (40.8)
Source: Weatherbase

== Education ==
Linn is home to State Technical College, a vocational-technical college. State tech was founded in 1961 as a part of the local school district and was transferred to the State of Missouri in 1996. In 2013, it was decided that the college would change its name to State Technical College of Missouri. The name change took effect July 1, 2014.

Linn is also home to the Osage County R-II School District. The district consists of Osage County R-II Elementary School (PK-06) and Linn High School(07–12), which is located near Linn Tech in a section on the outskirts of the city known as East Linn. A private school, St. George Catholic School, is located in downtown Linn along with St. George Catholic Church on Main Street.

Linn has a public library, a branch of the Osage County Branch Library.

== Notable person ==
- Albert Nilges, Missouri state representative

== See also ==
- List of cities in Missouri
