= State Technical College of Missouri =

Public technical school in Linn, Missouri, U.S.

- Former names: Linn Technical Junior College; Linn Technical College; Linn State Technical College
- Motto: The Employers' Choice
- Type: Public technical school
- Established: 1961
- President: Shawn Strong
- Undergraduates: 2,415 (fall 2024)
- Location: Linn, Missouri, U.S. 38.467695°N 91.814527°W
- Campus: Rural 360 acres (1.5 km^{2})
- Colors: Navy and Silver (white)
- Mascot: Eagles
- Website: www.statetechmo.edu
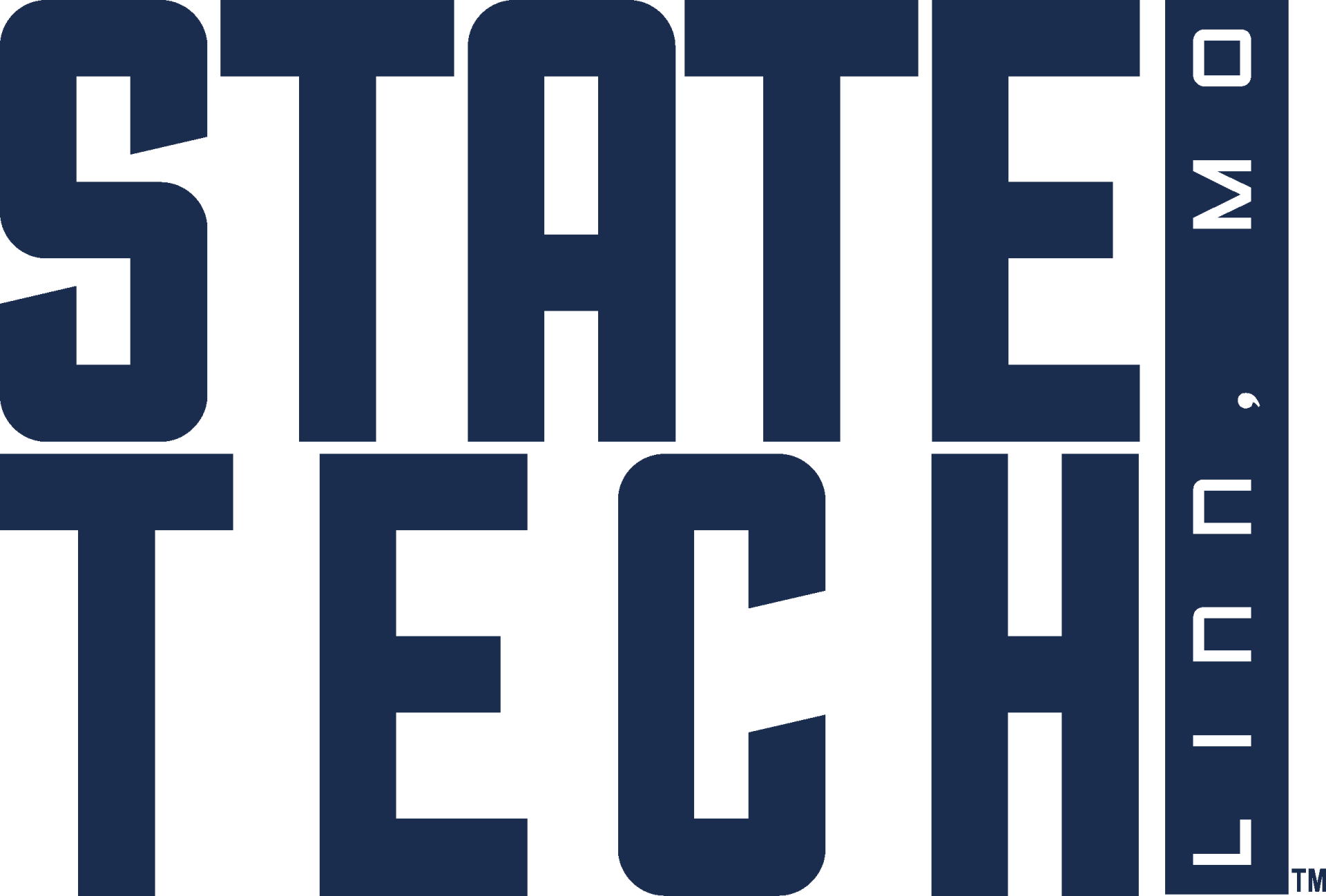

State Technical College of Missouri (State Tech) is a public technical school in Linn, Missouri, United States. In 2018, the college started to see a major increase in their enrollment at 1,483 students for the 2018–2019 school year. There were about 600 graduates in May 2019. Enrollment exceeded 2,000 students for the first time during the 2021 fall semester, and State Tech was named Missouri's fastest growing college by The Chronicle of Higher Education.

== History ==
State Tech began as Linn Technical Junior College in 1961, later being awarded the status of Area Vocational Technical School by the Missouri State Board of Education after the U.S. Vocational Education Act of 1963. The school dropped "Junior" from its name in 1968. In 1991, the college was granted the authority to give associate degrees. In 1995, Linn State Technical College separated from Osage County R-II School District after it obtained its own Board of Regents to govern it. In 2013, The Missouri House of Representatives voted to change the school's name to its current one, effective July 1, 2014. The new name emphasizes the school's status as Missouri's only state-funded technical college, not funded by local property taxes, drawing students from throughout the state.

== Facilities and resources ==
State Tech has various facilities and resources for use by its faculty, students, and local community.

=== Main campus ===
The main campus in Linn includes 11 academic buildings, cottage-style student housing, an activity center, and an airport. The most recently constructed academic building would be the Building Technology Center and the Willett Automation Center. In 2019 a 21,000-square-foot (2,000 m^{2}) Health Science Center and 10,200-square-foot (950 m^{2}) Welding Technology Center were able opened. The 72,000-square-foot (6,700 m^{2}) activity center opened in 2008; it includes three basketball courts, an elevated walking/running track, and a fitness center. The airport has a 3,400-by-60-foot (1,036 by 18 m) runway and hangars available for public rental. Ninety-five percent of the academic and housing building space uses geothermal energy for its heating and cooling. The campus library is a charter member of MOBIUS, which provides interlibrary lending access across Missouri and several nearby states. The college acquired a 110-acre (0.45 km^{2}) farm just east of the main campus, and rebuilt the ground floor of its farmhouse in 2017 to be used as the president's home and for social activities.

=== Osage County Community Center and Osage View ===
Adjacent to and managed by State Tech, the Osage County Community Center provides the college and community with an 11,000-square-foot (1,000 m^{2}) facility for meetings, conferences, training, and social events. The center's 3,200-square-foot (300 m^{2}) auditorium includes a catering kitchen. In 2024 State Tech opened an entertainment complex open to both students and the community. The Osage View consists of a movie theatre, swimming pool, bowling alley, restaurant, event center, sports simulator bays, a driving range and a 9-hole golf course.

=== Foundation ===
A non-profit foundation named for State Tech is its primary organization for fundraising to enable scholarships, faculty development, instructional equipment, facility construction, and other support to the college.

== Recognition ==
Forbes magazine ranked State Tech as the third-best two-year trade school in the nation in 2018.
