= Osage County R-II School District =

School district in Missouri, U.S.

Location
- 41 Wildcat Drive, Linn, Missouri United States

District information
- Motto: Every Student, Every Day
- Superintendent: Dr. Lenice Basham
- Schools: 3
- Budget: $5,769,000(As of 2014)
- NCES District ID: 2919080

Students and staff
- Students: 637 (As of 2016)
- Teachers: 51 (FTE) (As of 2016)
- Staff: 41 (As of 2016)
- District mascot: Wildcats

Other information
- Website: www.linn.k12.mo.us

Osage County R-II School District is a school district serving Osage County, Missouri. In the 2013–2014 school year Osage County R-2 School District spent $7,745 per student. The school district board governed State Technical College of Missouri until 1996 when it gained its own Board of Regents.

The district is mostly in Osage County, where it includes Linn. This district extends into a portion of Gasconade County.

== About ==
Osage County R-II school district operates 1 elementary school and high school while Osage County R-I School District operates another elementary and high school in Osage County. 98% of students graduate and 60% go on to some type of education past high school. 45% of students receive free or reduce priced lunches. The average teacher makes $34,877 while an administrator averages $71,550 a year. In 2015, the district broke ground on a new elementary school closer to the local middle and high school. The new school will be bigger and closer to the other schools for better administration.

== List of Schools ==
- Osage County Elementary (K-6)
- Linn High (7–12)
