= Ten percent plan =

Model for reinstatement of Southern states during the American Civil War

The Ten Percent Plan, formally in the Proclamation of Amnesty and Reconstruction (13 Stat. 737), was a United States presidential proclamation issued on December 8, 1863, by United States President Abraham Lincoln, during the American Civil War. By this point in the war (nearly three years in), the Union Army had pushed the Confederate Army out of several regions of the South, and some Confederate states were ready to have their governments rebuilt. Lincoln's plan established a process through which this postwar reconstruction could come about.

A component of President Lincoln's plans for the postwar reconstruction of the South, this proclamation decreed that a state in rebellion against the U.S. federal government could be reintegrated into the Union when 10% of the 1860 vote count from that state had taken an oath of allegiance to the U.S. and pledged to abide by Emancipation. Voters could then elect delegates to draft revised state constitutions and establish new state governments. All Southerners except for high-ranking Confederate army officers and government officials would be granted a full pardon. The policy also required the South to provide education for formerly enslaved people, who were no longer considered private property. Lincoln guaranteed Southerners that he would protect their remaining property. By 1864, Louisiana, Tennessee, and Arkansas had established fully functioning Unionist governments under these guidelines.

This policy was meant to shorten the war by offering a moderate peace plan. It was also intended to further his emancipation policy by insisting that the new governments abolish slavery.

== Reaction ==
Congress reacted sharply to this proclamation of Lincoln's plan. Most moderate Republicans in Congress supported the president's proposal for Reconstruction because they wanted to bring a swift end to the war, but other Republicans feared that the planter aristocracy would be restored and formerly enslaved individuals might be subjected to re-enslavement or systemic oppression. Lincoln's reconstructive policy toward the South was lenient because he wanted to popularize his Emancipation Proclamation. Lincoln feared that compelling enforcement of the proclamation could lead to the defeat of the Republican Party in the election of 1864, and that popular Democrats could overturn his proclamation.

The Radical Republicans opposed Lincoln's plan, as they thought it too lenient toward the South. Radical Republicans believed that Lincoln's plan for Reconstruction was not harsh enough because the South was guilty of starting the war and deserved to be punished as such. Radical Republicans hoped to control the Reconstruction process, transform Southern society, disband the planter aristocracy, redistribute land, develop industry, and guarantee civil liberties for former slaves.

Although the Radical Republicans were the minority party in Congress, they managed to sway many moderates in the postwar years and came to dominate Congress in later sessions. In the summer of 1864, the Radical Republicans passed a new bill to oppose the plan, known as the Wade–Davis Bill. These radicals believed that Lincoln's plan was too lenient, and this new bill would make readmission into the Union more difficult. The Bill stated that for a state to be readmitted, the majority of the state would have to take a loyalty oath, not just ten percent. Lincoln later pocket-vetoed this new bill.

== Criticism, political conflict, and legacy ==
While moderate Republicans supported Lincoln’s approach as a pragmatic path to end the war, Radical Republicans criticized the plan as too lenient and lacking guarantees for newly freed African Americans. They viewed it as allowing former Confederates to resume power without meaningful transformation of Southern society.

This led to the Wade–Davis Bill (1864), which proposed more stringent terms: a majority (rather than 10%) of white male citizens would be required to take an oath of loyalty, and high-ranking Confederate leaders would be permanently disenfranchised. The bill also demanded assurances of emancipation and political equality. Lincoln pocket-vetoed the bill, prompting the publication of the Wade–Davis Manifesto, in which Radical Republicans accused him of executive overreach and insufficient commitment to Reconstruction.

Black leaders also voiced concern. Frederick Douglass criticized the plan’s failure to secure political and economic rights for formerly enslaved people, calling it a policy that “betrays the cause of liberty.” Many modern historians argue that the Ten Percent Plan was not a comprehensive Reconstruction strategy, but rather a wartime political tool aimed at encouraging Southern Unionism and weakening Confederate resolve.

Following Lincoln’s assassination in 1865, the plan was never fully enacted. His successor, Andrew Johnson, adopted a similarly lenient approach to Reconstruction, but Congress ultimately rejected his policies, initiating Radical Reconstruction with a more aggressive federal role in reshaping the postwar South.

== See also ==
- Forty acres and a mule
- Freedmen's Bureau
- Treatment of slaves in the United States

== Bibliography ==
- Foner, Eric. Forever Free: The Story of Emancipation & Reconstruction. New York: Vintage Books, 2005.
