= Ironclad Oath =

Reconstruction-era oath in the USA

In the Reconstruction era, the Ironclad Oath was an oath promoted by Radical Republicans that required federal employees, lawyers, and federal elected officials to swear upon entry of office that they had never supported the Confederacy. The first such law adopted by Congress was in 1862, which attempted to make the oath a requirement for the incoming members of the 38th United States Congress to take the oath. In 1863, President Abraham Lincoln proposed the ten percent plan, which suggests that a state in rebellion could be reintegrated if a similar oath, with an additional pledge to abide by the nationwide abolition of slavery, was taken by 10% of its voters. Congress then attempted to raise this to a majority of voters in the Wade–Davis Bill of 1864, which Lincoln pocket vetoed because he thought it was too harsh. After the assassination of Lincoln in 1865, his successor Andrew Johnson opposed the oath altogether. Given the temporary disenfranchisement of the numerous Confederate veterans and local civic leaders, a Republican biracial coalition came to power in the 11 Southern states during Reconstruction. Southern conservative Democrats were angered to have been disenfranchised.

== Text ==
I, A. B., do solemnly swear (or affirm) that I have never voluntarily borne arms against the United States since I have been a citizen thereof; that I have voluntarily given no aid, countenance, counsel, or encouragement to persons engaged in armed hostility thereto; that I have neither sought nor accepted nor attempted to exercise the functions of any office whatever, under any authority or pretended authority in hostility to the United States; that I have not yielded a voluntary support to any pretended government, authority, power or constitution within the United States, hostile or inimical thereto. And I do further swear (or affirm) that, to the best of my knowledge and ability, I will support and defend the Constitution of the United States, against all enemies, foreign and domestic; that I will bear true faith and allegiance to the same; that I take this obligation freely, without any mental reservation or purpose of evasion, and that I will well and faithfully discharge the duties of the office on which I am about to enter, so help me God.

— Statutes at Large, Thirty-Seventh Congress, Second Session

== Reconstruction ==
The oath was a critical factor in removing many ex-Confederates from the political arena during the Reconstruction era of the late 1860s. To take the Ironclad Oath, a person had to swear he had never borne arms against the Union or supported the Confederacy: that is, he had "never voluntarily borne arms against the United States", had "voluntarily" given "no aid, countenance, counsel or encouragement" to persons in rebellion; and had exercised or attempted to exercise the functions of no office under the Confederacy. The oath was detested by ex-Confederates, some of whom called it "The Damnesty Oath."

Congress devised the oath in July 1862 for all federal employees, lawyers, and federal elected officials. Congress in turn made it voluntary for the incoming 38th United States Congress. In 1863, President Abraham Lincoln proposed the ten percent plan, which suggested that this same oath apply to 10% Southern voters as part of Reconstruction. Congress then attempted to apply the oath to a majority of Southern voters in the Wade–Davis Bill of 1864, which was pocket vetoed by Lincoln. President Andrew Johnson opposed the oath altogether. Lincoln believed the Ironclad Oath to be an essential part of Reconstruction. In 1864 Congress made the oath mandatory but overlooked perjury when it came to seating southern Republicans. Historian Harold Hyman says that in 1866 northern Representatives "described the oath as the last bulwark against the return of ex-rebels to power, the barrier behind which Southern Unionists and Negroes protected themselves."

The first Supplemental Reconstruction Act (March 23, 1867) required an oath of past loyalty for any man in the South to vote. The local registrar had to swear that he had never held office under the Confederacy nor given aid or comfort to it. They also had to take the ironclad oath.

In 1867, the US Supreme Court held that the federal ironclad oath for attorneys and the similar Missouri state oath for ministers, teachers, and other professionals were unconstitutional because they violated the constitutional prohibitions against bills of attainder and ex post facto laws.

In March 1867, Radicals in Congress passed a law that prohibited anyone from voting in the election of delegates to state constitutional conventions or in the subsequent ratification who was prohibited from holding office under Section 3 of the pending Fourteenth Amendment. Those exclusions were less inclusive than the requirements of the Ironclad Oath. The exclusions allowed the Republican coalitions to carry the elections in every southern state except Virginia. The Republican-dominated legislatures wrote and enacted new state constitutions that applied to all state officials and could not be repealed by an ordinary legislature vote.

The Republicans applied the oath in the South to keep political opponents from holding office or (in some states) from even voting. Hyman says, "most Southerners, even good Republican supporters, were disfranchised by the ironclad oath's blanket provisions rather than by the Fourteenth Amendment's highly selective disabilities."

Michael Perman emphasizes that the Republican ascendancy in the South was "extremely precarious" because Congress had defined the electorate, and "many potential opponents had been disfranchised, while others have simply refused to participate in what they regarded as a rigged election." Perman argues that while the Radicals had controlled the state constitutional conventions, they increasingly lost power inside the Republican Party to conservative forces, which repudiated disfranchisement and proscription. Voters in Texas, Virginia, and Mississippi voted down the new constitutions even though many opponents were disfranchised. The result was that by 1870, in every state except Arkansas, the Republicans had dropped restrictions against ex-Confederates and supporters, such as the Ironclad Oath. In Arkansas, the Republicans split, which led to an armed conflict called the Brooks–Baxter War.

In 1871, Congress modified the oath to permit all former rebels to use the 1868 formula to swear to "future loyalty." President Ulysses S. Grant vetoed the law, but Congress passed it.

Voting restrictions on former Confederates varied by state during the rest of the Reconstruction era. Few were disenfranchised in Georgia, Texas, Florida, North Carolina, and South Carolina. Alabama and Arkansas banned only those ineligible from holding office under the Fourteenth Amendment. Louisiana banned newspaper editors and religious ministers who had supported secession or anybody who had voted for the secession ordinance. Still, it allowed them to vote if they took an oath for Radical Reconstruction, a much more lenient avowal than that required by the Ironclad Oath. In states with disenfranchisement, the maximum was 10–20% of otherwise-eligible white voters; most states had much smaller proportions disenfranchised. In the South, the most support for the Ironclad Oath came from white Republicans from the Hill Counties, where they needed it to gain local majorities.

In May 1884, President Chester Arthur signed the law repealing the remaining Ironclad Oaths and jurors' test oath statutes.

== See also ==
- Redeemers
- Confederate oath of allegiance
