= Radical Republicans =

Faction of the 19th-century U.S. Republican Party

- Leader(s): John C. Frémont; Benjamin Wade; Benjamin Butler; Henry Winter Davis; Charles Sumner; Thaddeus Stevens; Hannibal Hamlin; Ulysses S. Grant; Schuyler Colfax
- Founded: 1854
- Dissolved: 1877
- Succeeded by: Stalwarts (faction)
- Ideology: Radicalism; Abolitionism; Reconstruction; Unconditional unionism; Developmentalism; Free labor
- National affiliation: Republican Party

The Radical Republicans were a political faction within the Republican Party originating from the party's founding in 1854—some six years before the Civil War—until the Compromise of 1877, which effectively ended Reconstruction. They called themselves "Radicals" because of their determinations to facilitate the rapid, complete, and permanent eradication of slavery in the United States through constitutional means, without resorting to a direct legislative or executive assault on the institution in established slave states. Their peacetime political approach was to exclude slavery from areas under federal government authority, including territorial lands, the District of Columbia and international waters so as to confine slavery within its existing state boundaries. There the institution was expected to decline and undergo dismantling by the state governments themselves with federal encouragement. Radical Republicans of the 1850s exhibited "a persistent refusal to compromise with the South on any question involving slavery," insisting upon a "denationalization" of the institution. When war broke out in 1861, radicals supported immediate military emancipation of slaves in the rebellious states.

On the issues of nativism, anti-Catholicism and prohibition of alcoholic beverages, radical Republicans regarded these as distractions or impediments to their abiding mission to eradicate slavery. Though many Republicans held anti-immigrant, anti-Catholic, and pro-temperance sentiments, they emphatically opposed these becoming politicized and alienating key demographics that they wished to enlist in the anti-slavery cause. To the extent that radicals tolerated nativism, it was largely that the nativists Know-Nothings were expected to undermine the Whig and Democratic Parties and clear the way for the rise of the Republican Party. Though Nativists ultimately cast their votes for Republican politicians, their ideology was never embraced by the party establishment, which regarded them with suspicion.

In the late 1850s, moderate Republicans drew closer to the radical wing of the party in their hostility toward the Slave Power.

Moderates also saw the political utility of stressing the moral injustice of slavery stressed by radicals. By 1860, Lincoln was considered to be closer to the radicals than the conservative wing of the party. During the secession crisis that unfolded after Lincoln's election, radicals initially rejected the moderate and conservative wings' efforts to placate southerners with concessions. Neither the radical anti-compromise position nor the moderates' limited conciliation satisfied the South. The right and left wings of the Republican Party coalesced under Lincoln's moderate wing: "The goals of free soil and Union were intertwined, and neither could be sacrificed without endangering the other."

Radicals led efforts after the war to establish civil rights for former slaves and fully implement emancipation. After unsuccessful measures in 1866 resulted in violence against former slaves in the former rebel states, Radicals pushed the Fourteenth Amendment for statutory protections through Congress. They opposed allowing ex-Confederate politicians and military veterans to retake political power in the Southern U.S., and emphasized equality, civil rights and voting rights for the "freedmen", i.e., former slaves who had been freed during or after the Civil War by the Emancipation Proclamation and the Thirteenth Amendment.

During the war, Radicals opposed Lincoln's selection of General George B. McClellan for top command of the major eastern Army of the Potomac and Lincoln's efforts in 1864 to bring seceded Southern states back into the Union as quickly and easily as possible. Lincoln later recognized McClellan as unfit and relieved him of his command. The Radicals tried to pass their own Reconstruction plan in Congress in 1864. Lincoln vetoed it, as he was putting his own policy in effect through his power as commander-in-chief. Radicals demanded the uncompensated abolition of slavery, while Lincoln wished instead to emulate the British Empire's abolition of slavery by financially compensating former slave owners who had remained loyal to the Union. Lincoln was assassinated in April 1865. The Radicals, led by Thaddeus Stevens, bitterly fought Lincoln's successor, Andrew Johnson. After Johnson vetoed various congressional bills granting citizenship to freedmen, a much harsher Reconstruction for the defeated South, and other bills he considered unconstitutional, the Radicals attempted to remove him from office through impeachment, which failed by one vote in 1868.

During the Reconstruction period, Radical Republicans supported pro-labor legislation, in contrast to conservative Democrats and Liberal Republicans.

== Radical coalition ==
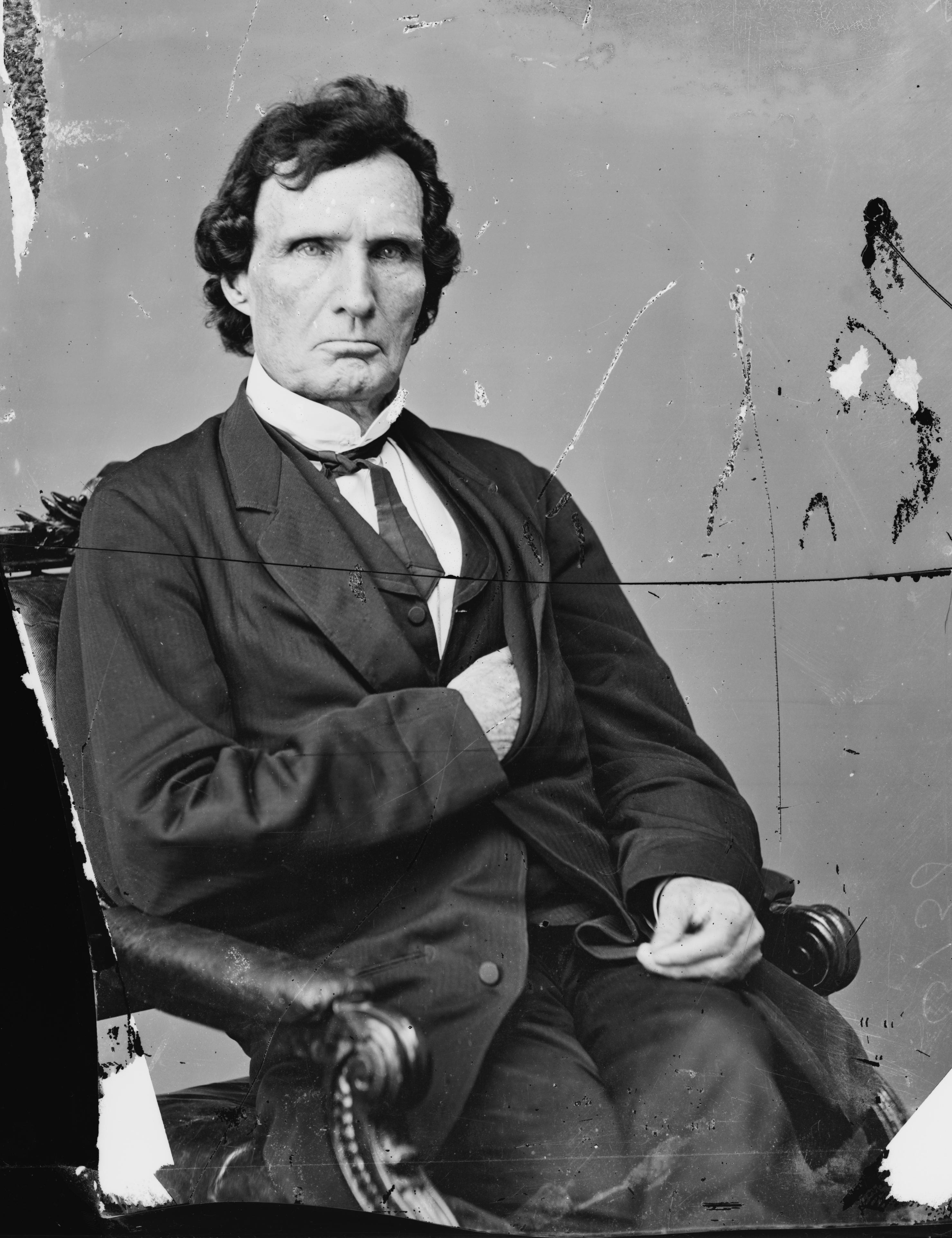
U.S. Rep. Thaddeus Stevens

The Radicals were heavily influenced by religious ideals, and many were Protestant reformers who saw slavery as evil and the Civil War as God's punishment for slavery. Indeed, during the wartime issuance of the Emancipation Proclamation, Lincoln's Treasury Secretary, Salmon P. Chase, a radical and a Christian, added the final clause requesting God's blessing for the measure. As the crisis over slavery intensified in the late 1850s, radical politicians resorted to religious invective, among them Joshua Giddings, Owen Lovejoy, and Charles Sumner, each delivering inflammatory speeches characterizing slaveholders as homicidal sinners.

The term "radical" was in common use in the anti-slavery movement before the Civil War, referring not necessarily to abolitionists, but particularly to Northern politicians strongly opposed to the Slave Power. Many and perhaps a majority had been Whigs, such as William H. Seward, a leading presidential contender in 1860 and Lincoln's Secretary of State, Thaddeus Stevens of Pennsylvania, as well as Horace Greeley, editor of the New-York Tribune. The publication most dedicated to radical politics was Gamaliel Bailey's The National Era.

There was movement in both directions: some of the pre-war Radicals (such as Seward) became less radical during the war, while some prewar moderates became Radicals. Some wartime Radicals had been Democrats before the war, often taking pro-slavery positions. They included John A. Logan of Illinois, Edwin Stanton of Ohio, Benjamin Butler of Massachusetts, and Vice President Johnson; Johnson would break with the Radicals after he became president.

The Radicals came to majority power in Congress in the elections of 1866 after several episodes of violence led many to conclude that President Johnson's weaker reconstruction policies were insufficient. These episodes included the New Orleans riot and the Memphis riots of 1866. In a pamphlet directed to black voters in 1867, the Union Republican Congressional Committee stated:

[T]he word Radical as applied to political parties and politicians ... means one who is in favor of going to the root of things; who is thoroughly in earnest; who desires that slavery should be abolished, that every disability connected therewith should be obliterated.

The Radicals were never formally organized and there was movement in and out of the group. Their most successful and systematic leader was Pennsylvania Congressman Thaddeus Stevens in the House of Representatives. The Democrats were strongly opposed to the Radicals, but they were generally a weak minority in politics until they took control of the House in the 1874 congressional elections. The "Moderate" and "Conservative" Republican factions usually opposed the Radicals, but they were not well organized. Lincoln tried to build a multi-faction coalition, including Radicals, "Conservatives," "Moderates" and War Democrats as while he was often opposed by the Radicals, he never ostracized them. Andrew Johnson was thought to be a Radical when he became president in 1865, but he soon became their leading opponent. However, Johnson could not form a cohesive support network. Finally in 1872, the Liberal Republicans, who wanted a return to classical republicanism, ran a presidential campaign and won the support of the Democratic Party for their ticket. They argued that Grant and the Radicals were corrupt and had imposed Reconstruction far too long on the South. They were overwhelmingly defeated in the 1872 election and collapsed as a movement.

On issues not concerned with the destruction of the Confederacy, the eradication of slavery and the rights of Freedmen, Radicals took positions all over the political map. For example, Radicals who had once been Whigs generally supported high tariffs and ex-Democrats generally opposed them. Some men were for hard money and no inflation while others were for soft money and inflation. The argument, common in the 1930s, that the Radicals were primarily motivated by a desire to selfishly promote Northeastern business interests, has seldom been argued by historians for a half-century. On foreign policy issues, the Radicals and moderates generally did not take distinctive positions.

== Wartime ==
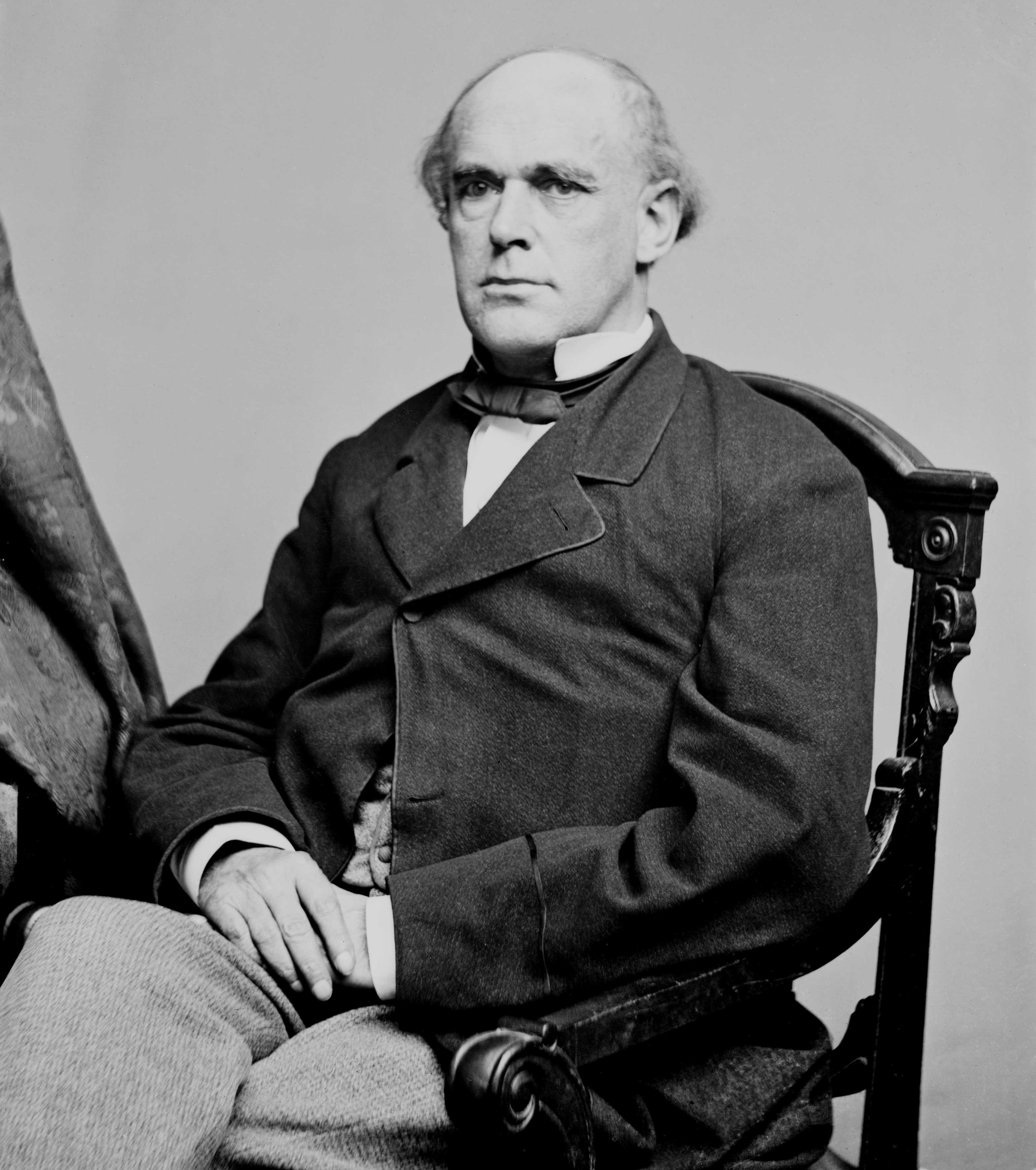
Salmon P. Chase, Lincoln's Secretary of the Treasury

After the 1860 elections, moderate Republicans dominated the Congress. Radical Republicans were often critical of Lincoln, who they believed was too slow in freeing slaves and supporting their legal equality. Lincoln put all factions in his cabinet, including Radicals like Salmon P. Chase (Secretary of the Treasury and whom he later appointed Chief Justice), James Speed (Attorney General) and Edwin M. Stanton (Secretary of War). Lincoln additionally appointed many Radicals to key diplomatic positions, such as journalist James Shepherd Pike. Nevertheless, Radicals remained critical. In 1864 some Radicals broke from the Republicans to form the Radical Democratic Party, with John C. Frémont as their candidate for president, until Frémont withdrew.

An important Republican opponent of the Radical Republicans was Henry Jarvis Raymond. Raymond was both editor of The New York Times and also a chairman of the Republican National Committee. In Congress, the most influential Radical Republicans were U.S. Senator Charles Sumner and U.S. Representative Thaddeus Stevens. They led the call for a war that would end slavery.

== Reconstruction policy ==
=== Opposing Lincoln ===
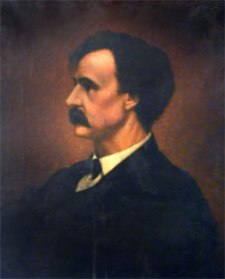
Henry Winter Davis, one of the authors of the Wade–Davis Manifesto opposing Lincoln's "ten percent" reconstruction plan

The Radical Republicans opposed Lincoln's terms for reuniting the United States during Reconstruction (1863), which they viewed as too lenient. They proposed an "ironclad oath" that would prevent anyone who supported the Confederacy from voting in Southern elections, but Lincoln blocked it and once Radicals passed the Wade–Davis Bill in 1864, Lincoln vetoed it. The Radicals demanded a more aggressive prosecution of the war, a faster end to slavery and total destruction of the Confederacy. After the war, the Radicals controlled the Joint Committee on Reconstruction.

=== Opposing Johnson ===
After Lincoln's assassination, War Democrat Vice President Andrew Johnson became president. Although he appeared at first to be a Radical, he broke with them and became embroiled in a bitter struggle with them. Johnson proved a poor politician and his allies lost heavily in the 1866 elections in the North. The Radicals now had full control of Congress and could override Johnson's vetoes.

=== Control of Congress ===
After the 1866 elections, the Radicals generally controlled Congress. Johnson vetoed 21 bills passed by Congress during his term, but the Radicals overrode 15 of them, including the Civil Rights Act of 1866 and four Reconstruction Acts, which rewrote the election laws for the South and allowed blacks to vote while prohibiting former Confederate Army officers from holding office. As a result of the 1867–1868 elections, the newly empowered freedmen, in coalition with carpetbaggers (Northerners who had recently moved south) and Scalawags (white Southerners who supported Reconstruction), set up Republican governments in 10 Southern states (all but Virginia).

=== Impeachment ===
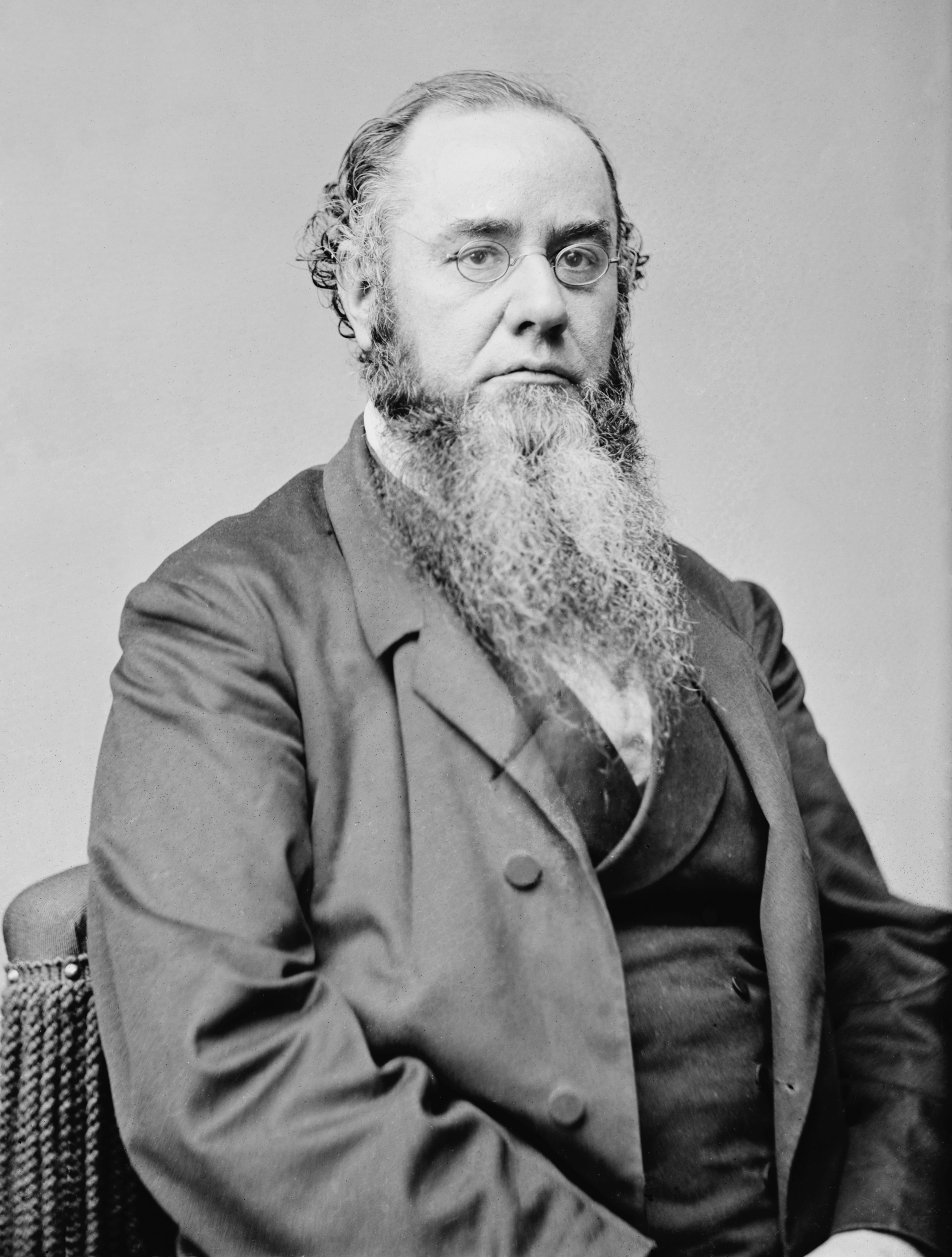
Edwin McMasters Stanton, Lincoln's Secretary of War, whom Johnson tried to remove from office

The Radical plan was to remove Johnson from office, but the first effort at the impeachment trial of President Johnson went nowhere. After Johnson violated the Tenure of Office Act by dismissing Secretary of War Edwin M. Stanton, the House of Representatives voted 126–47 to impeach him, but the Senate acquitted him in 1868 in three 35–19 votes, failing to reach the 36 votes threshold required for a conviction; by that time, however, Johnson had lost most of his power.

=== Supporting Grant ===
General Ulysses S. Grant in 1865–1868 was in charge of the Army under President Johnson, but Grant generally enforced the Radical agenda. The leading Radicals in Congress were Thaddeus Stevens in the House and Charles Sumner in the Senate. Grant was elected president as a Republican in 1868 and after the election he generally sided with the Radicals on Reconstruction policies and signed the Civil Rights Act of 1871 into law.

The Republicans split in 1872 over Grant's reelection, with the Liberal Republicans, including Sumner, opposing Grant with a new third party. The Liberals lost badly, but the economy then went into a depression in 1873 and in 1874 the Democrats swept back into power and ended the reign of the Radicals.

The Radicals tried to protect the new coalition, but one by one the Southern states voted the Republicans out of power until in 1876 only three were left (Louisiana, Florida and South Carolina), where the Army still protected them. The 1876 presidential election was so close that it was decided in those three states despite massive fraud and illegalities on both sides. The Compromise of 1877 called for the election of a Republican as president and his withdrawal of the troops. Republican Rutherford B. Hayes withdrew the troops and the Republican state regimes immediately collapsed.

== Reconstruction of the South ==
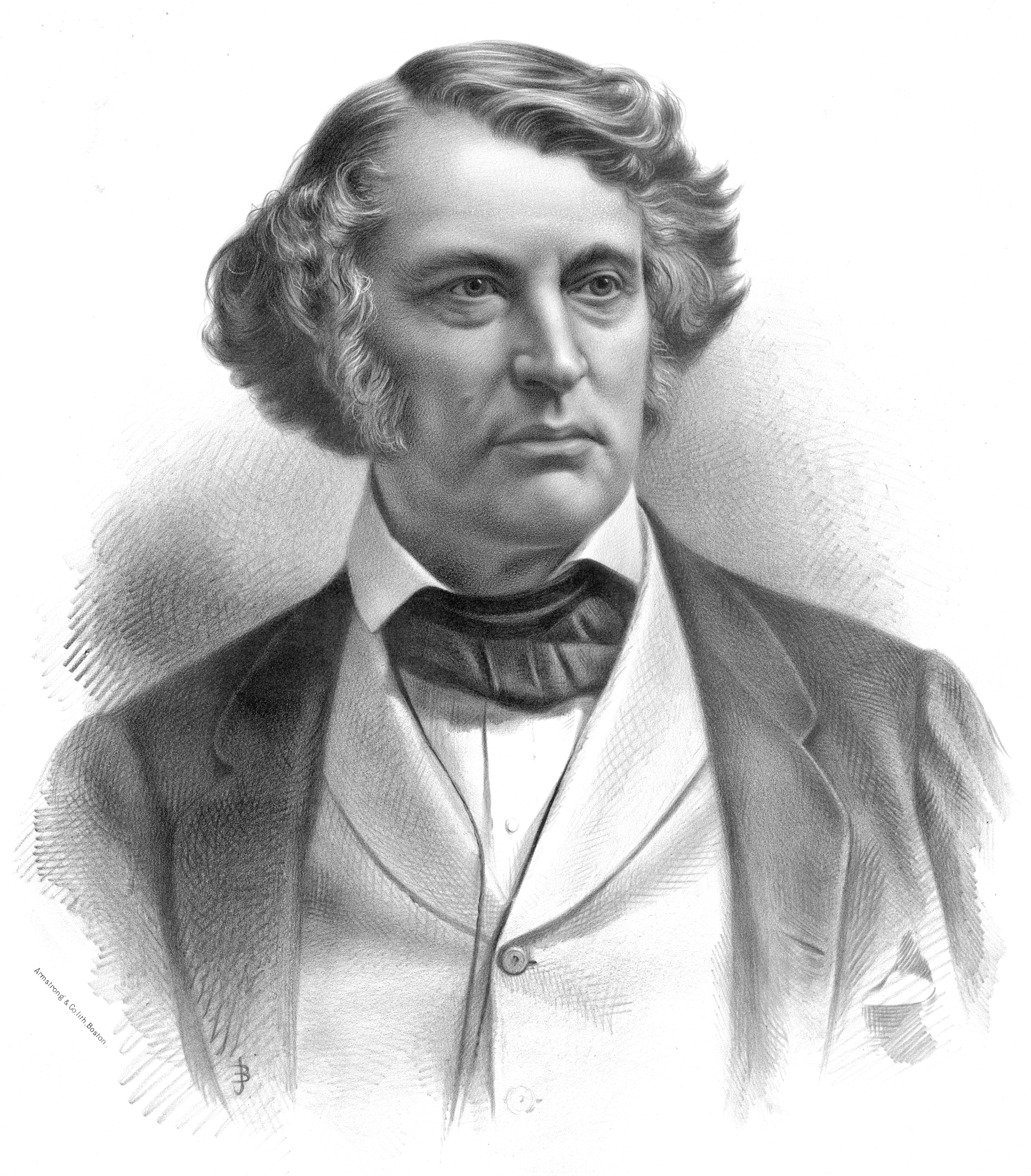
U.S. Senator Charles Sumner

In 1865, Radical Republicans increasingly took control, led by Sumner and Stevens. They demanded harsher measures in the South, more protection for the Freedmen and more guarantees that the Confederate nationalism was eliminated. Following Lincoln's assassination in 1865, Andrew Johnson, a former War Democrat, became president.

The Radicals at first admired Johnson's hard-line talk. When they discovered his ambivalence on key issues by his veto of Civil Rights Act of 1866, they overrode his veto. This was the first time that Congress had overridden a president on an important bill. The Civil Rights Act of 1866 made African Americans United States citizens, forbade discrimination against them and it was to be enforced in Federal courts. The Fourteenth Amendment to the U.S. Constitution of 1868 (with its Equal Protection Clause) was the work of a coalition formed of both moderate and Radical Republicans.

By 1866, the Radical Republicans supported federal civil rights for freedmen, which Johnson opposed. By 1867, they defined terms for suffrage for freed slaves and limited early suffrage for many ex-Confederates. While Johnson opposed the Radical Republicans on some issues, the decisive congressional elections of 1866 gave the Radicals enough votes to enact their legislation over Johnson's vetoes. Through elections in the South, ex-Confederate officeholders were gradually replaced with a coalition of freedmen, Southern whites (pejoratively called scalawags) and Northerners who had resettled in the South (pejoratively called carpetbaggers). The Radical Republicans were successful in their efforts to impeach President Johnson in the House, but failed by one vote in the Senate to remove him from office.

The Radicals were opposed by former slaveowners and white supremacists in the rebel states. Radicals were targeted by the Ku Klux Klan, who shot to death one Radical Congressman from Arkansas, James M. Hinds.

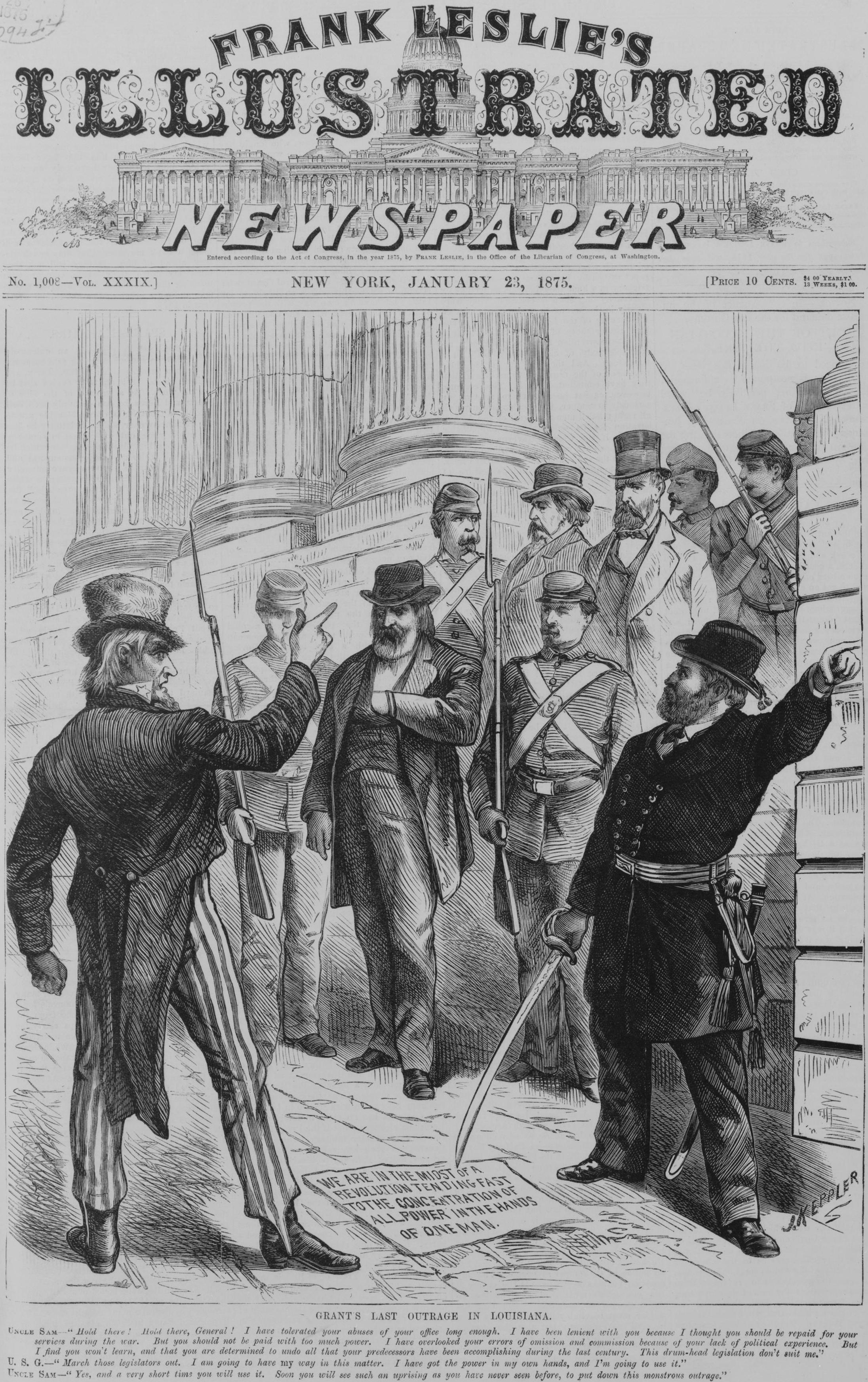
"Grant's Last Outrage in Louisiana" art in Frank Leslie's Illustrated Newspaper of January 23, 1875

The Radical Republicans led the Reconstruction of the South. All Republican factions supported Ulysses Grant for president in 1868. Once in office, Grant forced Sumner out of the party and used Federal power to try to break up the Ku Klux Klan organization. However, insurgents and community riots continued harassment and violence against African Americans and their allies into the early 20th century. By the 1872 presidential election, the Liberal Republicans thought that Reconstruction had succeeded and should end. Many moderates joined their cause as well as Radical Republican leader Charles Sumner. They nominated New-York Tribune editor Horace Greeley, who was also nominated by the Democrats. Grant was easily reelected.

== End of Reconstruction ==
By 1872, the Radicals were increasingly splintered and in the congressional elections of 1874, the Democrats took control of Congress. Many former Radicals joined the "Stalwart" faction of the Republican Party while many opponents joined the "Half-Breeds", who differed primarily on matters of patronage rather than policy.

In state after state in the South, the so-called Redeemers' movement seized control from the Republicans until in 1876 only three Republican states were left: South Carolina, Florida, and Louisiana. In the intensely disputed 1876 U.S. presidential election, Republican presidential candidate Rutherford B. Hayes was declared the winner following the Compromise of 1877 (a corrupt bargain): he obtained the electoral votes of those states, and with them the presidency, by committing himself to removing federal troops from those states. Deprived of military support, Reconstruction came to an end. "Redeemers" took over in these states as well. As white Democrats now dominated all Southern state legislatures, the period of Jim Crow laws began, and rights were progressively taken away from blacks. This period would last over 80 years, until the gains made by the Civil Rights Movement.

== Historiography ==
In the aftermath of the Civil War and Reconstruction, new battles took place over the construction of memory and the meaning of historical events. The earliest historians to study Reconstruction and the Radical Republican participation in it were members of the Dunning School, led by William Archibald Dunning and John W. Burgess. The Dunning School, based at Columbia University in the early 20th century, saw the Radicals as motivated by an irrational hatred of the Confederacy and a lust for power at the expense of national reconciliation. According to Dunning School historians, the Radical Republicans reversed the gains Abraham Lincoln and Andrew Johnson had made in reintegrating the South, established corrupt shadow governments made up of Northern carpetbaggers and Southern scalawags in the former Confederate states, and to increase their power, foisted political rights on the newly freed slaves that they were allegedly unprepared for or incapable of utilizing. For the Dunning School, the Radical Republicans made Reconstruction a dark age that only ended when Southern whites rose up and reestablished a "home rule" free of Northern, Republican, and black influence.

In the 1930s, the Dunning-oriented approaches were rejected by self-styled "revisionist" historians, led by Howard K. Beale along with W.E.B. DuBois, William B. Hesseltine, C. Vann Woodward and T. Harry Williams. They downplayed corruption and stressed that Northern Democrats were also corrupt. Beale and Woodward were leaders in promoting racial equality and re-evaluated the era in terms of regional economic conflict. They were also hostile towards the Radicals, casting them as economic opportunists. They argued that apart from a few idealists, most Radicals were scarcely interested in the fate of the blacks or the South as a whole. Rather, the main goal of the Radicals was to protect and promote Northern capitalism, which was threatened in Congress by the West; if the Democrats took control of the South and joined the West, they thought, the Northeastern business interests would suffer. They did not trust anyone from the South except men beholden to them by bribes and railroad deals. For example, Beale argued that the Radicals in Congress put Southern states under Republican control to get their votes in Congress for high protective tariffs.

The role of Radical Republicans in creating public school systems, charitable institutions, and other social infrastructure in the South was downplayed by the Dunning School of historians. Since the 1950s, the impact of the moral crusade of the civil rights movement led historians to reevaluate the role of Radical Republicans during Reconstruction, and their reputation improved. These historians, sometimes referred to as neoabolitionist because they reflected and admired the values of the abolitionists of the 19th century, argued that the Radical Republicans' advancement of civil rights and suffrage for African Americans following emancipation was more significant than the financial corruption which took place. They also pointed to the African Americans' central, active roles in reaching toward education (both individually and by creating public school systems) and their desire to acquire land as a means of self-support.

Democrats retook power across the South and held it for decades, restricting African American voters and largely extinguishing their voting rights over the years and decades following Reconstruction. In 2004, Richardson argued that Northern Republicans came to see most blacks as potentially dangerous to the economy because they might prove to be labor radicals in the tradition of the 1871 Paris Commune or Great Railroad Strike of 1877 and other violent American strikes of the 1870s. Meanwhile, it became clear to Northerners that the white South was not bent on revenge or the restoration of the Confederacy. Most of the Republicans who felt this way became opponents of Grant and entered the Liberal Republican camp in 1872.

=== Notable people ===
- Amos Tappan Akerman: attorney general under the Grant administration who vigorously prosecuted the Ku Klux Klan in the South under the Enforcement Acts
- Adelbert Ames: Governor of Mississippi (1868–1870, 1874–1876)
- James Mitchell Ashley: representative from Ohio
- John Armor Bingham: representative from Ohio and principal framer of the Fourteenth Amendment to the United States Constitution
- Austin Blair: Governor of Michigan (1861–1865)
- George Sewall Boutwell: representative from Massachusetts and Treasury Secretary under President Grant from 1869 to 1873
- William Gannaway Brownlow: publisher of the Knoxville Whig, Governor of Tennessee (1865–1869) and Senator
- Rufus Bullock: Governor of Georgia (1868–1871)
- Benjamin Butler: Massachusetts politician-soldier who was hated by rebels for restoring control in New Orleans
- Zachariah Chandler: Senator from Michigan and Secretary of the Interior under President Grant
- Salmon P. Chase: Treasury Secretary under President Lincoln and Supreme Court chief justice who sought the 1868 Democratic nomination as a moderate
- Schuyler Colfax: Speaker of the House (1863–1869) and the 17th Vice President of the United States (1869–1873). Was called the Christian statesman
- John Conness: Senator from California
- John Creswell: elected Baltimore Representative to the House in 1863 during the Civil War, Creswell worked closely under Radical Republican Baltimore Representative Henry Winter Davis and was appointed Postmaster-General by President Grant in 1869, having vast patronage powers appointed many African Americans to federal postal positions in every state of the United States
- Edmund J. Davis: Governor of Texas (1870–1874)
- Henry Winter Davis: representative from Maryland
- Charles Daniel Drake: Senator from Missouri
- Reuben Fenton: Governor of New York (1865–1868)
- Thomas Clement Fletcher: Governor of Missouri (1865–1869)
- John C. Frémont: the 1856 Republican presidential candidate
- James A. Garfield: House of Representatives leader, less radical than others and president in 1881
- Horace Greeley: the founder and editor of the New-York Tribune, which became the most radical newspaper of the day. Greeley initially strongly supported Radical Reconstruction, but over time became disenchanted with the corruption associated with it, and broke with the Radical Republicans to run for president on the Liberal Republican ticket against Grant.
- Joshua Reed Giddings: representative from Ohio and an early leading founder of the Ohio Republican Party
- George Congdon Gorham: Secretary of the United States Senate (1868–1879)
- Ulysses S. Grant: president who signed Enforcement Acts and Civil Rights Act of 1875 while as General of the Army of the United States he supported Radical Reconstruction and civil rights for African Americans
- Galusha A. Grow: representative from Pennsylvania and Speaker of the House 1861 to 1863
- John Parker Hale: Senator from New Hampshire and one of the first to make a stand against slavery. He was a former Democrat who broke away because of slavery
- Hannibal Hamlin: Maine politician and vice president during Lincoln's first term
- Friedrich Hecker: leader of the German-American Forty-Eighters
- James M. Hinds: Congressman from Arkansas, murdered by the Ku Klux Klan in 1868
- William Woods Holden: Governor of North Carolina (1868–1871)
- Jacob M. Howard: Senator from Michigan
- Timothy Otis Howe: Senator from Wisconsin
- George Washington Julian: representative from Indiana and principal framer of the Fifteenth Amendment to the United States Constitution
- William Darrah Kelley: representative from Pennsylvania
- Samuel J. Kirkwood: Senator from Iowa
- James H. Lane: Senator from Kansas and leader of the Jayhawkers abolitionist movement
- John Alexander Logan: Senator from Illinois
- Owen Lovejoy: representative from Illinois
- David Medlock Jr.: member of the Texas House of Representatives (1870–1873), served on the Federal Relations Committee.
- Oliver P. Morton: Governor of Indiana (1861–1867) and Senator
- Franklin J. Moses Jr.: Governor of South Carolina (1872–1874)
- Samuel Pomeroy: Senator from Kansas
- Harrison Reed: Governor of Florida (1868–1873)
- Samuel Shellabarger: representative from Ohio and principal drafter of the Civil Rights Act of 1871
- Rufus Paine Spalding: representative from Ohio who took a leading role in the Congressional debates over Reconstruction
- Edwin McMasters Stanton: Secretary of War under the Lincoln and Johnson administrations
- Thaddeus Stevens: Radical leader in the House from Pennsylvania
- Charles Sumner: Senator from Massachusetts, dominant Radical leader in the Senate and specialist in foreign affairs who broke with Grant in 1872
- Albion W. Tourgée: novelist
- Lyman Trumbull: Senator from Illinois with strongly anti-slavery sentiments, but otherwise moderate
- Daniel Phillips Upham: Arkansas politician-soldier who was ruthless in a campaign that would temporarily rid the South of the Ku Klux Klan
- Benjamin Franklin Wade: Senator from Ohio, next in line to become president if Johnson were removed
- Henry Clay Warmoth: Governor of Louisiana in 1868–1872
- Elihu Benjamin Washburne: representative from Illinois
- George Henry Williams: Senator from Oregon (1865–1871) and attorney general under President Grant
- Henry Wilson: Massachusetts Senator, chairman of the Senate Military Affairs Committee during the Civil War, and vice president under Grant
- James F. Wilson: representative from Iowa, chairman of the House Judiciary Committee during the impeachment of President Johnson and Senator from Iowa
- Richard Yates Sr.: Governor of Illinois (1861–1865) and Senator

== Sources ==
- Foner, Eric. 1970. Free Soil, Free Labor, Free Men: The Ideology of the Republican Party Before the Civil War. Oxford University Press, London, New York. ISBN 0-19-501352-2
- Wilentz, Sean. 2005. The Rise of American Democracy: Jefferson to Lincoln. W. W. Norton & Company, New York. ISBN 0-393-05820-4.
- Oakes, James. 2021. Crooked Path to Abolition: Abraham Lincoln and the Antislavery Constitution. W. W. Norton and Company, New York. ISBN 978-1-324-00585-8

== References and further reading ==
=== Secondary sources ===
- Belz, Herman (1998). Abraham Lincoln, Constitutionalism and Equal Rights in the Civil War Era. Fordham University Press.
- Belz, Herman (1978). Emancipation and Equal Rights: Politics and Constitutionalism in the Civil War Era.
- Belz, Herman (2000). A New Birth of Freedom: The Republican Party and Freedman's Rights, 1861–1866.
- Benedict, Michael Les (1999). The Impeachment and Trial of Andrew Johnson.
- Blackburn, George M. (April 1969). "Radical Republican Motivation: A Case History". The Journal of Negro History. 54 (2): 109–126. doi:10.2307/2716688. JSTOR 2716688. S2CID 149744005. Re Michigan Senator Zachariah Chandler
- Bowers, Claude G. (1929). The Tragic Era: The Revolution after Lincoln. 567 pages, intense anti-Radical narrative by prominent Democrat
- Brands, H. W. The Man Who Saved the Union: Ulysses Grant in War and Peace (Doubleday, 2013) online
- Castel, Albert E. (1979). The Presidency of Andrew Johnson. Regents Press of Kansas. ISBN 978-0700601905.
- Donald, David (1970). Charles Sumner and the Rights of Man. Major critical analysis.
- Donald, David (1996). Lincoln. A major scholarly biography
- Goodwin, Doris Kearns (2005). Team of Rivals: The Political Genius of Abraham Lincoln. Simon and Schuster. ISBN 978-0684824901.
- Foner, Eric (2002). Reconstruction: America's Unfinished Revolution, 1863–1877. Major synthesis; many prizes
- Foner, Eric (1990). A Short History of Reconstruction. Harper & Row. ISBN 978-0-06-096431-3. Abridged version
- Harris, William C. (1997). With Charity for All: Lincoln and the Restoration of the Union. Lincoln as moderate and opponent of Radicals.
- Howard, Victor B. Religion and the Radical Republican Movement, 1860–1870 (University Press of Kentucky, 2014) online
- Lyons, Philip B. Statesmanship and Reconstruction: Moderate versus Radical Republicans on Restoring the Union after the Civil War (Lexington Books, 2014).
- McFeely, William S. (1981). Grant: A Biography. ISBN 978-0393013726. Pulitzer Prize.
- McKitrick, Eric L. (1961). Andrew Johnson and Reconstruction.
- Milton, George Fort (1930). The Age of Hate: Andrew Johnson and the Radicals. Hostile
- Nevins, Allan (1936). Hamilton Fish: The Inner History of the Grant Administration. Pulitzer Prize.
- Randall, James G. (1955). Lincoln the President: Last Full Measure. Fourth and final volume of a biography. The main title of all four volumes is Lincoln the President; the fourth volume was completed by Richard N. Current upon Randall's death.
- Rhodes, James Ford (1920). History of the United States from the Compromise of 1850 to the McKinley-Bryan Campaign of 1896. Volumes 6 and 7. Highly detailed political narrative.
- Richards, Leonard L. Who Freed the Slaves?: The Fight Over the Thirteenth Amendment (University of Chicago Press, 2015).
- Richardson, Heather Cox (2007). West from Appomattox: The Reconstruction of America after the Civil War.
- Richardson, Heather Cox (2004). The Death of Reconstruction: Race, Labor, and Politics in the Post-Civil War North, 1865–1901.
- Riddleberger, Patrick W. (April 1959). "The Break in the Radical Ranks: Liberals vs Stalwarts in the Election of 1872". The Journal of Negro History. 44 (2): 136–157. doi:10.2307/2716035. JSTOR 2716035. S2CID 149957268.
- Ross, Earle Dudley (1910). The Liberal Republican Movement. Scholarly history
- Stampp, Kenneth M. (1967). The Era of Reconstruction, 1865–1877.
- Simpson, Brooks D. (1991). Let Us Have Peace: Ulysses S. Grant and the Politics of War and Reconstruction, 1861–1868. University of North Carolina Press. ISBN 978-0807819661.
- Simpson, Brooks D. (1998). The Reconstruction Presidents. University Press of Kansas. ISBN 978-0700608966.
- Summers, Mark Wahlgren. Railroads, Reconstruction, and the Gospel of Prosperity: Aid Under the Radical Republicans, 1865–1877 (Princeton University Press, 2014) online.
- Trefousse, Hans (1991). Historical Dictionary of Reconstruction.
- Trefousse, Hans L. (1969). The Radical Republicans: Lincoln's Vanguard for Racial Justice. New York: Alfred A. Knopf. Favorable to Radicals
- Trefousse, Hans L. (2001). Thaddeus Stevens: Nineteenth-Century Egalitarian. Favorable biography.
- Trefousse, Hans L. (2014). The Radical Republicans. Knopf Doubleday Publishing Group. ISBN 978-0-8041-5392-8.
- Williams, T. Harry (1941). Lincoln and the Radicals. Hostile to Radicals
- Zuczek, Richard (2006). Encyclopedia of the Reconstruction Era. 2 vol.

=== Historiography and memory ===
- Bogue, Allan G. (June 1983). "Historians and Radical Republicans: A Meaning for Today". Journal of American History. 70 (1): 7–34. doi:10.2307/1890519. JSTOR 1890519.
- Keith, LeeAnna. When It Was Grand: The Radical Republican History of the Civil War (2020) excerpt; also online review
- Launius, Roger D. (1987). "Williams and the Radicals: An Historiographical Essay". Louisiana History. 28 (2): 141–164. JSTOR 4232573.
- Leipold, Bruno, Karma Nabulsi, and Stuart White, eds. Radical republicanism: Recovering the tradition's popular heritage (Oxford University Press, 2020) online.
- Scroggs, Jack B. (November 1958). "Southern Reconstruction: A Radical View". The Journal of Southern History. 24 (4): 407–429. doi:10.2307/2954670. JSTOR 2954670.
- Zander, Cecily N. (March 2023). "Whither the Radicals?". Reviews in American History. 51 (1): 91–102. doi:10.1353/rah.2023.a900725.

=== Primary sources ===
- Harper's Weekly news magazine
- Barnes, William H., ed. History of the Thirty-ninth Congress of the United States. (1868) useful summary of Congressional activity.
- Blaine, James.Twenty Years of Congress: From Lincoln to Garfield. With a review of the events which led to the political revolution of 1860 (1886). By Republican Congressional leader full text online
- Fleming, Walter L. Documentary History of Reconstruction: Political, Military, Social, Religious, Educational, and Industrial 2 vol (1906). Uses broad collection of primary sources; vol 1 on national politics; vol 2 on states full text of vol. 2
- Hyman, Harold M., ed. The Radical Republicans and Reconstruction, 1861–1870. (1967), collection of long political speeches and pamphlets.
- Edward McPherson, The Political History of the United States of America During the Period of Reconstruction (1875), large collection of speeches and primary documents, 1865–1870, complete text online. [The copyright has expired.]
- Palmer, Beverly Wilson and Holly Byers Ochoa, eds. The Selected Papers of Thaddeus Stevens 2 vol (1998), 900 pp; his speeches plus and letters to and from Stevens
- Palmer, Beverly Wilson, ed/ The Selected Letters of Charles Sumner 2 vol (1990); vol 2 covers 1859–1874
- Charles Sumner, "Our Domestic Relations: or, How to Treat the Rebel States" Atlantic Monthly September 1863, early Radical manifesto

=== Yearbooks ===
- American Annual Cyclopedia...1868 (1869), online, highly detailed compendium of facts and primary sources; details on every state
- American Annual Cyclopedia...for 1869 (1870) online edition
- Appleton's Annual Cyclopedia...for 1870 (1871)
- American Annual Cyclopedia...for 1872 (1873)
- Appleton's Annual Cyclopedia...for 1873 (1879) online edition
- Appleton's Annual Cyclopedia...for 1875 (1877)
- Appleton's Annual Cyclopedia ...for 1876 (1885) online edition
- Appleton's Annual Cyclopedia...for 1877 (1878)
