= Presidency of Andrew Johnson =

U.S. presidential administration from 1865 to 1869

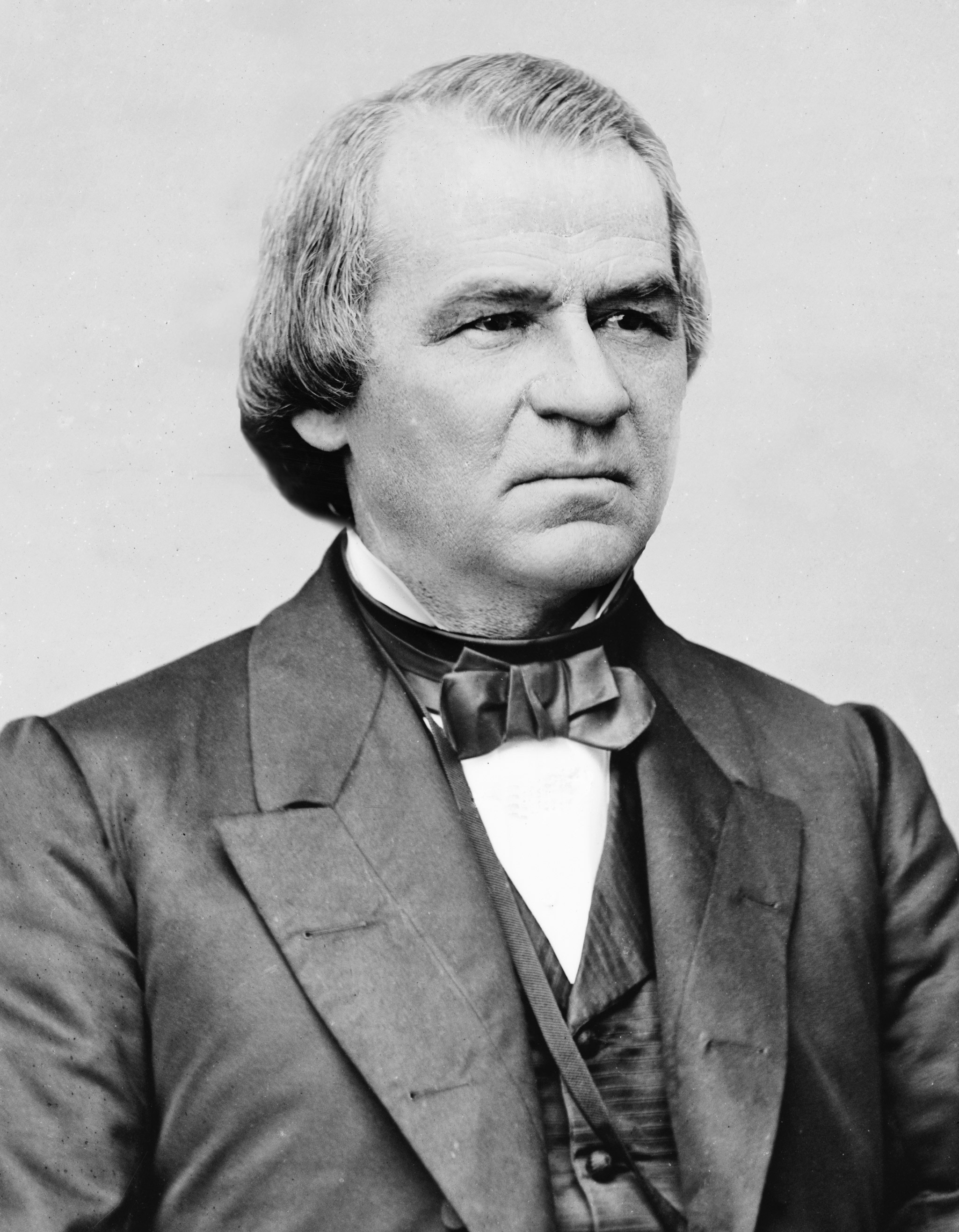
- Johnson, c. 1870–1875
- Presidency of Andrew Johnson; April 15, 1865 – March 4, 1869
- Vice President: None (Note: Johnson was vice president under Abraham Lincoln and became president upon Lincoln's death. As this was prior to the adoption of the Twenty-fifth Amendment in 1967, a vacancy in the office of vice president was not filled until the next ensuing election and inauguration.)
- Cabinet: See list
- Party: National Union (1865–1868) (Note: At the time of his accession to the presidency, Johnson was a former member of the Democratic Party who had been elected vice president on the National Union Party's ticket. He attempted to establish his own party under the National Union label before unsuccessfully seeking the presidential nomination at the 1868 Democratic National Convention. For details and references, see the section partisan affiliation.); Democratic (1868–1869)
- Seat: White House
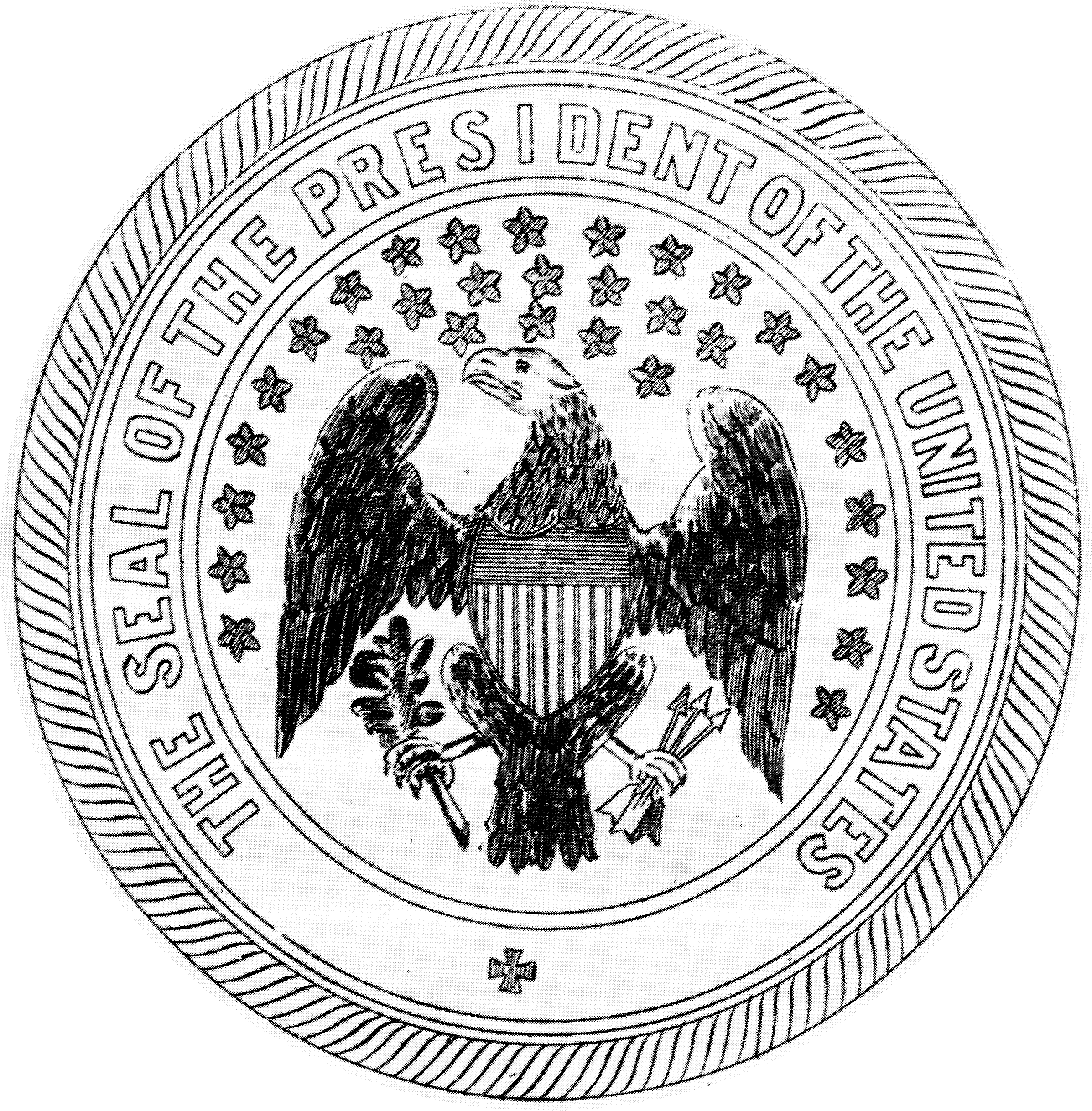
- Seal of the president (1850–1894)

Andrew Johnson was the 17th president of the United States from April 15, 1865, after the assassination of President Abraham Lincoln, to March 4, 1869. Johnson was a member of the Democratic Party before the Civil War and had been Lincoln's 1864 running mate on the National Union ticket, which was supported by Republicans and War Democrats. Johnson took office as the Civil War came to a close, and his presidency was dominated by the aftermath of the war. As president, Johnson attempted to build his own party of Southerners and conservative Northerners, but he was unable to unite his supporters into a new party. Republican Ulysses S. Grant succeeded Johnson as president.

Johnson, who was himself from Tennessee, favored quick restoration of the seceded states to the Union. He implemented his own form of Presidential Reconstruction – a series of proclamations directing the seceded states to hold conventions and elections to re-form their civil governments. His plans did not give protection to the former slaves, and he came into conflict with the Republican-dominated Congress. When Southern states returned, many of their old leaders passed Black Codes to deprive the freedmen of many civil liberties, congressional Republicans refused to seat legislators from those states and established military districts across the South. Johnson vetoed their bills, and congressional Republicans overrode him, setting a pattern for the remainder of his presidency. (Note: Johnson saw 15 of his vetoes overridden by Congress, more than any other President, before or since.)

Frustrated by Johnson's actions, Congress proposed the Fourteenth Amendment to the states, and the amendment was ratified in 1868. As the conflict between the branches of government grew, Congress passed the Tenure of Office Act, restricting Johnson's ability to fire Cabinet officials. When he persisted in trying to dismiss Secretary of War Edwin Stanton, he was impeached by the House of Representatives, making him the first U.S. president to be impeached. Johnson narrowly avoided conviction in the Senate and removal from office, but he exercised little power in his last year in office. In foreign policy, Johnson presided over the purchase of Alaska and the end of the second French intervention in Mexico. Having broken with Republicans, and failing to establish his own party under the National Union banner, Johnson sought the 1868 Democratic presidential nomination, but it went to Horatio Seymour instead. Seymour's defeat by Grant in the 1868 presidential election left Northern Republicans firmly in control of Reconstruction.

Though he was held in high esteem by the Dunning School of historians, more recent historians rank Johnson among the worst presidents in American history for his frequent clashes with Congress, strong opposition to federally guaranteed rights for African Americans, and general ineffectiveness as president.

== Accession ==
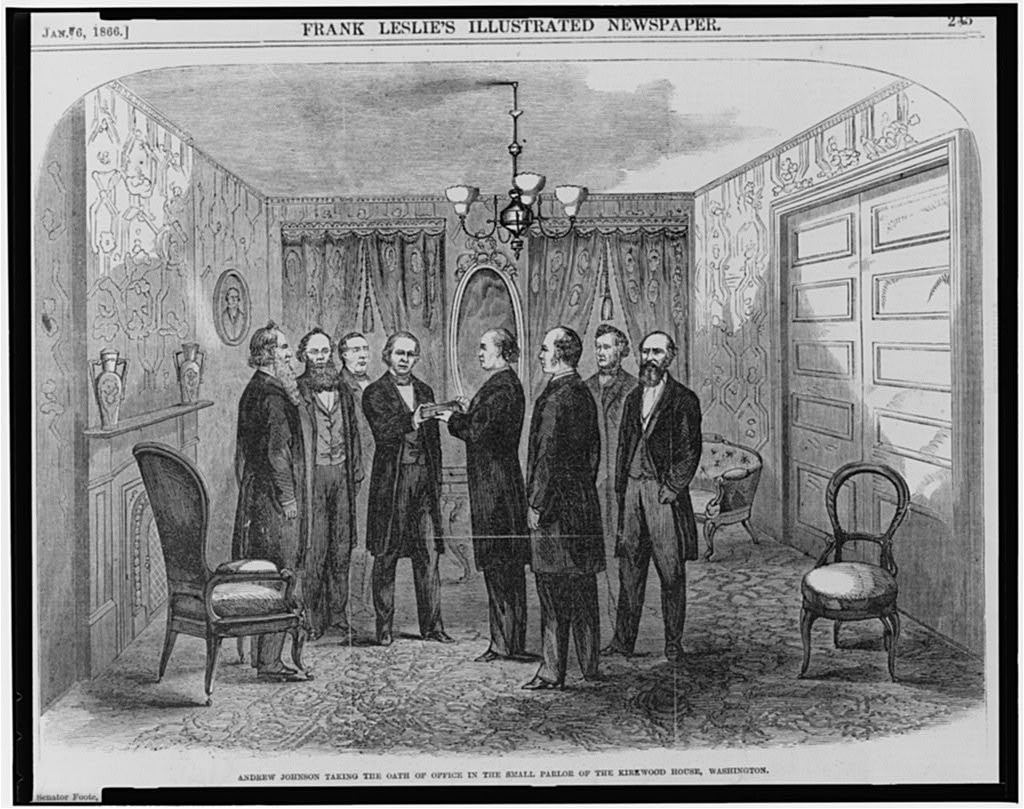
Contemporary woodcut of Johnson being sworn in by Chief Justice Chase as Cabinet members look on, April 15, 1865

On April 14, 1865, in the closing days of the Civil War, President Abraham Lincoln was shot and mortally wounded by John Wilkes Booth, a Confederate sympathizer. The shooting of the president was part of a conspiracy to assassinate Lincoln, Vice President Andrew Johnson, and Secretary of State William Seward on the same night. Seward barely survived his wounds, while Johnson escaped attack as his would-be assassin, George Atzerodt, got drunk instead of killing the vice president. Leonard J. Farwell, a fellow boarder at the Kirkwood House, awoke Johnson with news of Lincoln's shooting at Ford's Theatre. Johnson rushed to the president's deathbed, where he remained a short time, on his return promising, "They shall suffer for this. They shall suffer for this." Lincoln died at 7:22 am the next morning; Johnson's swearing in occurred between 10 and 11 am with Chief Justice Salmon P. Chase presiding in the presence of most of the Cabinet. Johnson's demeanor was described by the newspapers as "solemn and dignified". Johnson presided over Lincoln's funeral ceremonies in Washington, before his predecessor's body was sent home to Springfield, Illinois, for burial.

At the suggestion of Attorney General James Speed, Johnson allowed a military commission to try the surviving alleged perpetrators of Lincoln's assassination. A six-week trial culminated in death sentences for four of the defendants, along with lesser sentences for the others. The events of the assassination resulted in speculation, then and subsequently, concerning Johnson and what the conspirators might have intended for him. In the vain hope of having his life spared after his capture, Atzerodt spoke much about the conspiracy, but did not say anything to indicate that the plotted assassination of Johnson was merely a ruse. Conspiracy theorists point to the fact that on the day of the assassination, Booth came to the Kirkwood House and left one of his cards. This object was received by Johnson's private secretary, William A. Browning, with an inscription, "Are you at home? Don't wish to disturb you. J. Wilkes Booth."

== Partisan affiliation ==
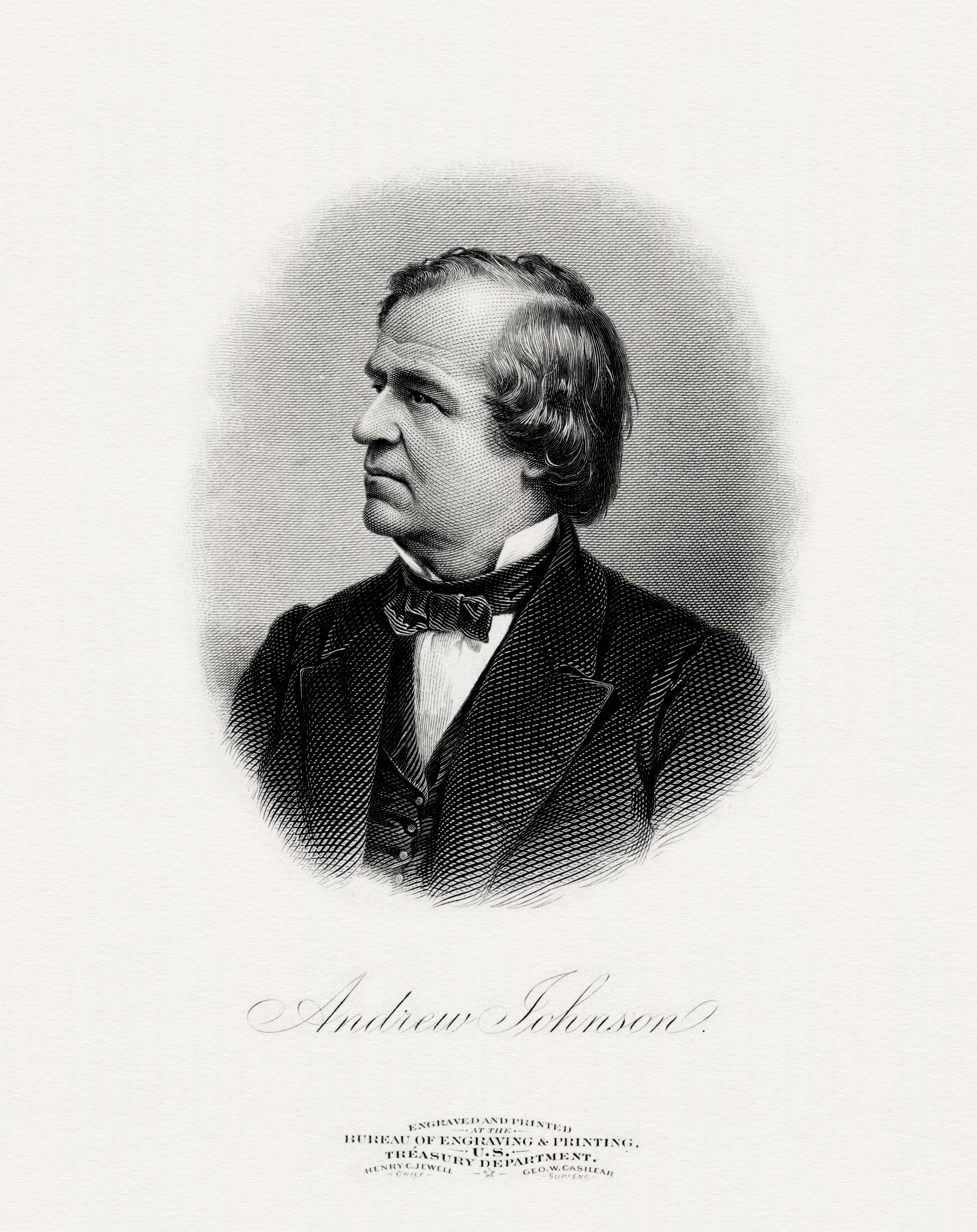
BEP engraved portrait of Johnson as president

Johnson took office at a time of shifting partisan alignments. Former Whigs and former Democrats contended for influence within the Republican Party, while the remaining Northern Democrats looked to redefine their party in the wake of the Civil War. Johnson's accession left a Southern Democrat in the president's office at the end of a civil war that had as its immediate impetus the election of Abraham Lincoln, a Northern Republican, to the presidency in 1860. Johnson had served as a Democrat in various offices prior to the Civil War, and he became one of the most prominent Southern Unionists after the start of the war. During the 1864 presidential election, the Republican ticket campaigned as the National Union ticket, and the National Union convention chose Johnson as the party's vice presidential nominee in large part because of Johnson's status as a prominent Southern War Democrat. Though he never declared himself to be a Republican, when Johnson took office, he had widespread approval within the Republican Party.

Johnson's Reconstruction policy quickly alienated many in the Republican Party, while Johnson's patronage decisions and alliance with Seward alienated many Democrats. Instead of allying with either of the established parties, Johnson sought to create a new party consisting of the conservative elements of both parties. In August 1866, Johnson held a convention of his supporters in Philadelphia. The convention endorsed Johnson's program, but Johnson was unable to establish a durable coalition. Towards the end of his term, Johnson pursued the 1868 Democratic nomination, but his alliance with Lincoln and his patronage decisions had made him many enemies in that party.

== Administration ==
Johnson cabinet
Office	Name	Term
President	Andrew Johnson	1865–1869
Vice President	none	1865–1869
Secretary of State	William H. Seward	1865–1869
Secretary of the Treasury	Hugh McCulloch	1865–1869
Secretary of War	Edwin Stanton	1865–1868^{†}
John Schofield	1868–1869
Attorney General	James Speed	1865–1866
Henry Stanbery	1866–1868
William M. Evarts	1868–1869
Postmaster General	William Dennison Jr.	1865–1866
Alexander Randall	1866–1869
Secretary of the Navy	Gideon Welles	1865–1869
Secretary of the Interior	John Palmer Usher	1865
James Harlan	1865–1866
Orville Hickman Browning	1866–1869
- ^{†} replaced ad interim by Ulysses S. Grant in August 1867 before being reinstated by Congress in January 1868

On taking office, Johnson promised to continue the policies of his predecessor, and he initially kept Lincoln's cabinet in place. Secretary of State William Seward became one of the most influential members of Johnson's Cabinet, and Johnson allowed Seward to pursue an expansionary foreign policy. Early in his presidency, Johnson trusted Secretary of War Edwin Stanton to carry out his Reconstruction policies, and he also had a favorable opinion of Secretary of the Navy Gideon Welles and Secretary of the Treasury Hugh McCulloch. He had less esteem for Postmaster General William Dennison Jr., Attorney General James Speed, and Secretary of the Interior James Harlan.

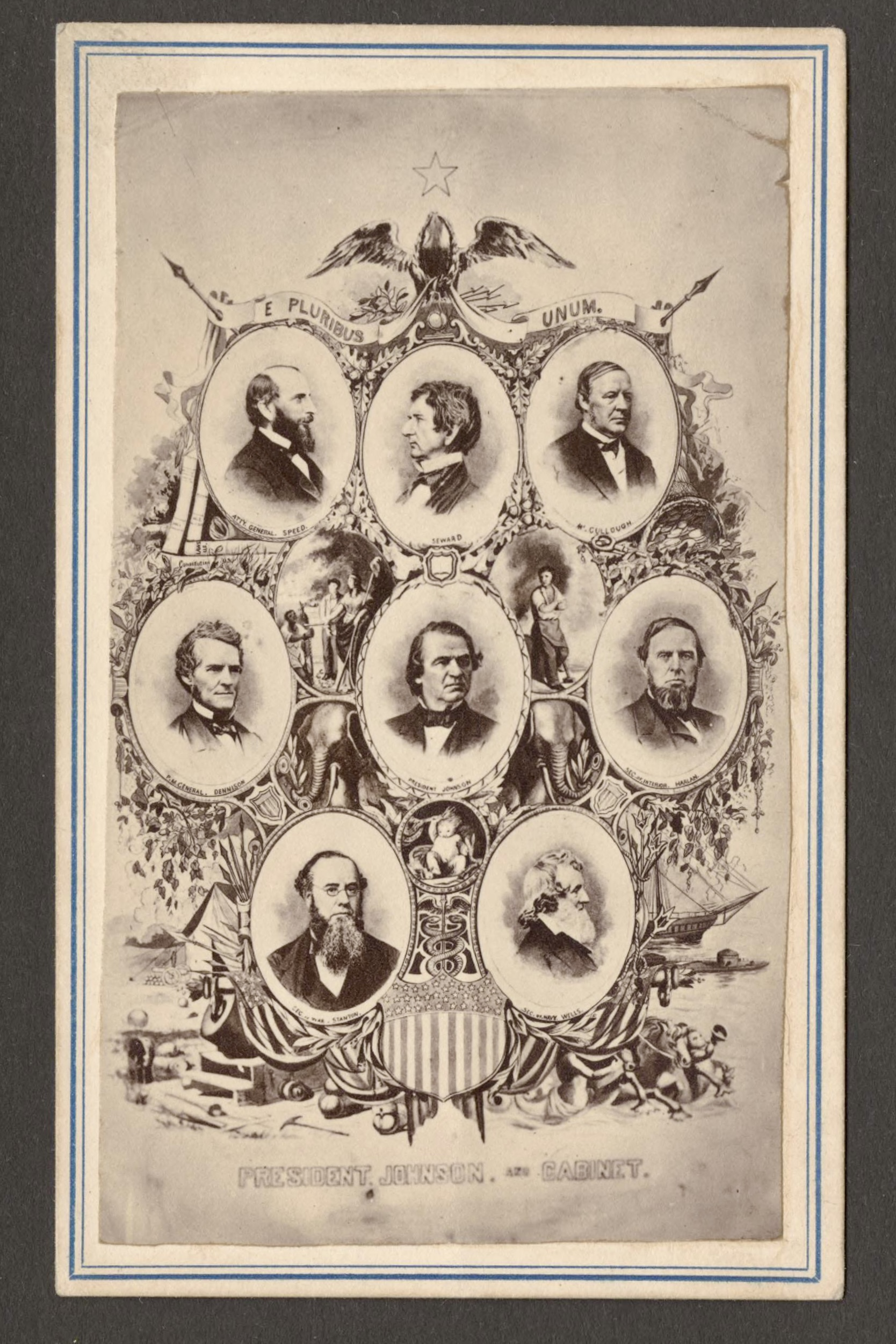
Carte de visite depicting President Johnson encircled by portraits of William Seward, Edwin Stanton, James Speed, William Dennison, Gideon Welles, and John P. Usher (U-M William L. Clements Library)

Harlan, Dennison, and Speed resigned in June 1866 after Johnson had broken with congressional Republicans. Speed's replacement, Henry Stanbery, emerged as one of the most prominent members of Johnson's cabinet before resigning to defend Johnson during his impeachment trial. Johnson suspended Stanton after disagreements related to Reconstruction and replaced him with General of the Army Ulysses S. Grant on an interim basis. After clashing with Grant, Johnson offered the position of Secretary of War to General William T. Sherman, who declined, and to Lorenzo Thomas, who accepted. Thomas never took office; Johnson appointed John Schofield as Secretary of War as a compromise with moderate Republicans.

== Judicial appointments ==
Johnson appointed nine Article III federal judges during his presidency, all to United States district courts; he did not successfully appoint a justice to serve on the Supreme Court. In April 1866, he nominated Henry Stanbery to fill the Supreme Court vacancy left by the death of Associate Justice John Catron, but Congress eliminated the seat by passing the Judicial Circuits Act of 1866. To ensure that Johnson did not get to make any appointments, the act also provided that the Court would shrink by one justice when one next departed from office. Johnson did appoint his Greeneville crony, Samuel Milligan, to the United States Court of Claims, where he served from 1868 until his death in 1874.

== End of the Civil War and abolition of slavery ==
Johnson took office after Robert E. Lee's surrender at Appomattox Court House, but Confederate armies remained in the field. On April 21, 1865, Johnson, with the unanimous backing of his cabinet, ordered General Ulysses S. Grant to overturn an armistice concluded between Union General William T. Sherman and Confederate General Joseph E. Johnston. The armistice had included political conditions such as the recognition of existing Confederate state governments. On May 2, Johnson issued a proclamation offering $100,000 for the capture of Confederate President Jefferson Davis, who many thought had been involved in the assassination of Lincoln. Davis was captured on May 10. In late May, the final Confederate force in the field surrendered, and Johnson presided over a triumphant military parade in Washington, D.C. alongside the cabinet and the nation's top generals. After less than two months in office, Johnson had cultivated the reputation of someone who would be tough on the defeated Confederacy, and his esteem among congressional Republicans remained high.

In the final days of Lincoln's presidency, Congress had approved what would become the Thirteenth Amendment, which abolished slavery and involuntary servitude nationwide. The amendment was ratified by the requisite number of states (then 27) in December 1865, becoming the Thirteenth Amendment to the United States Constitution. Though Lincoln's Emancipation Proclamation had freed many slaves in the former Confederacy, the Thirteenth Amendment permanently abolished slavery nationwide and freed slaves in border states like Kentucky.

== Reconstruction ==
With the end of the Civil War, Johnson faced the question of what to do with the states that had formed the Confederacy. President Lincoln had authorized loyalist governments in Virginia, Arkansas, Louisiana, and Tennessee as the Union came to control large parts of those states and advocated a ten percent plan that would allow elections after ten percent of the voters in any state took an oath of future loyalty to the Union. Many in Congress considered this too lenient. The Wade–Davis Bill, requiring a majority of voters to take the loyalty oath, had passed both houses of Congress in 1864, but Lincoln had pocket vetoed it.

At the time of Johnson's accession, Congress consisted of three factions. The Radical Republicans sought voting and other civil rights for African Americans. They believed that the freedmen could be induced to vote Republican in gratitude for emancipation, and that black votes could keep the Republicans in power. Radical Republicans were defined by their views on Reconstruction, the protection of minority rights, and the necessity of a stronger postwar role for the federal government; they did not hold unified views on economic matters. The Moderate Republicans were not as enthusiastic about the idea of African-American suffrage as their Radical colleagues, either because of their own local political concerns, or because they believed that the freedman would be likely to cast his vote badly. Nonetheless, they were committed to ensuring that African-Americans were granted more than "nominal freedom," and they opposed restoring Confederate officials to power. The third faction in Congress, Northern Democrats, favored the unconditional restoration of the Southern states and opposed African-American suffrage.

=== Presidential Reconstruction ===
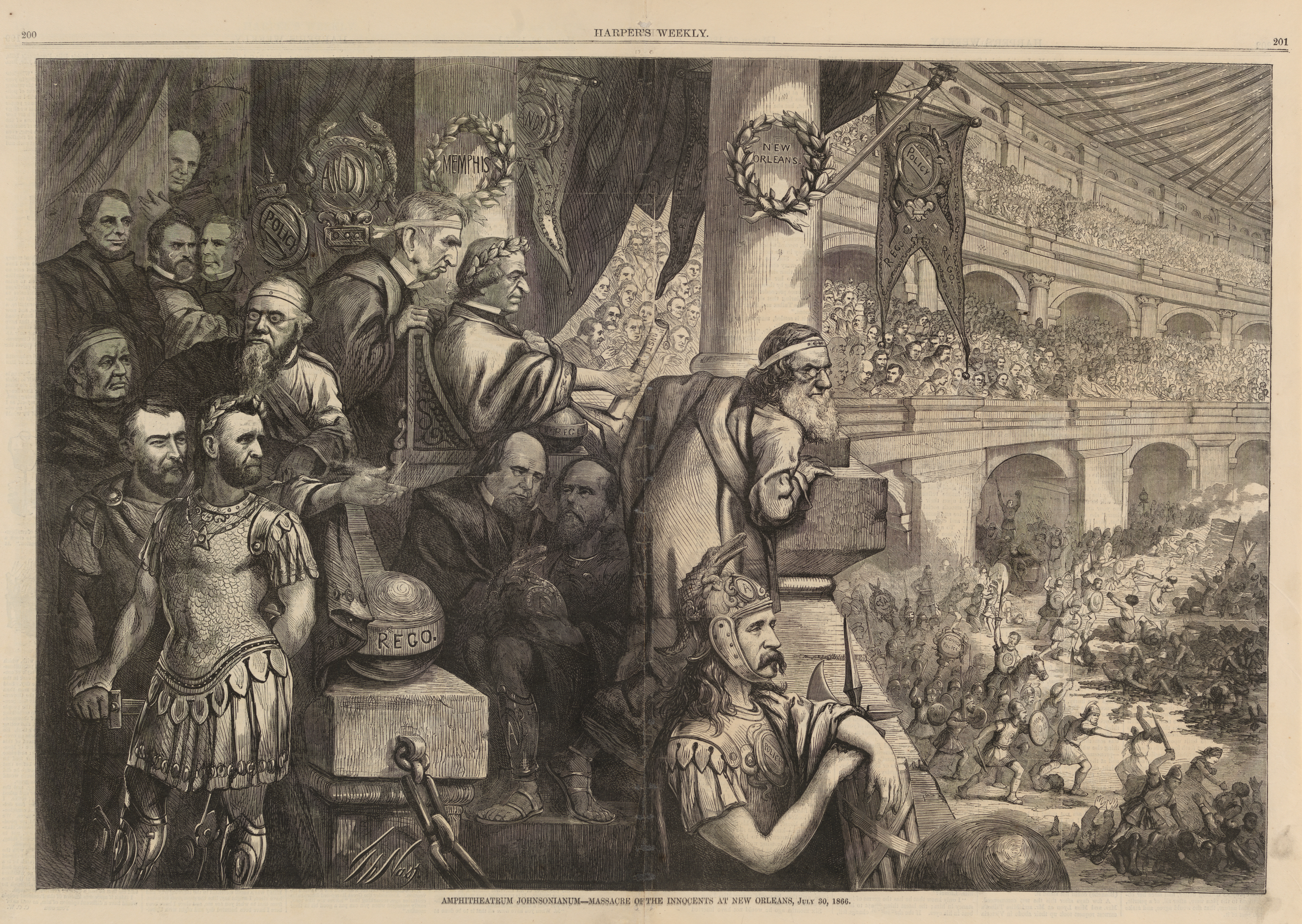
Amphitheatrum Johnsonianum was one of a series of images by Thomas Nast arguing that Presidential Reconstruction risked the lives of freedmen—"people whose potential could be lost through northern inaction"

Johnson was initially left to devise a Reconstruction policy without legislative intervention, as Congress was not due to meet again until December 1865. Johnson believed that the Southern states had never truly left the Union. With the rebellion defeated, he thought that the South should re-take their place as equal partners under the United States Constitution. Despite the pleas of African-Americans and many congressional Republicans, Johnson viewed suffrage as a state issue, and was uninterested in using federal power to impose sweeping changes on the defeated South. Johnson instead sought to help working class whites overcome the elite planter class, with African Americans still relegated to the lowest rung of Southern society.

Johnson decided to organize state governments throughout the South, acting quickly to reconstitute governments in states that had, until recently, been in rebellion. In May 1865, he removed Nathaniel P. Banks from command in Louisiana after Banks protested the appointment of former Confederate officials by Governor James Madison Wells. That same month, Johnson recognized Francis Harrison Pierpont's government in Virginia, and appointed William Woods Holden as Governor of North Carolina. Johnson subsequently appointed governors to lead the other former Confederate states. He chose those governors without regard to their previous political affiliation or ideology, instead focusing upon their loyalty to the Union during the Civil War. Johnson did not impose many conditions on his governors, asking only that they seek the ratification of the Thirteenth Amendment and the repudiation of secession ordinances and the Confederate debt. Alabama Governor Lewis E. Parsons, a Johnson appointee, declared that "every political right which the state possessed under the federal Constitution is hers today, with the single exception relating to slavery." The Southern governors called state conventions that in turn organized new governments and called new elections, from which former secessionists emerged triumphant. The new governments passed strict Black Codes that constituted a virtual re-establishment of slavery. Johnson refused to interfere, as he firmly believed that such matters were state, rather than federal, issues.

Johnson frequently acted to undermine the Freedmen's Bureau, an agency that had been established by Congress in March 1865. Together with the U.S. Army, the Freedmen's Bureau acted as a relief agency and police force in the South, providing aid to both whites and blacks. In September 1865, Johnson overturned a Freedmen's Bureau order that had granted abandoned land to freedmen who had begun cultivating it; Johnson instead ordered such property returned to its pre-war owners. Johnson also purged Freedmen's Bureau officers whom Southern whites had accused of favoring blacks. Johnson was less active in curbing the army's authority than that of the Freedmen's Bureau, but the army nonetheless saw its influence decline as soldiers were demobilized following the end of the war.

In addition to quickly restoring state governments and interfering with the work of the Freedmen's Bureau, Johnson also sought to restore the property and civil rights of white Southerners. On May 29, 1865, Johnson offered amnesty to most former Confederates. The order did not include high military and civil officers of the Confederacy, war criminals, and those with taxable property greater than $20,000. In late 1865 and early 1866, on the advice of the Southern governors that he had appointed, Johnson pardoned much of the elite planter class. Subsequently, the planter elite largely re-took power in the South, contrary to Johnson's earlier plans for Reconstruction. Foner notes that the motivation for Johnson's decision to re-empower to the Southern prewar elite, despite his earlier support for the punishment of rebel leaders, "has always been something of a mystery." Foner speculates that Johnson believed that an alliance with the planters would ensure ongoing white domination of the South and boost his 1868 re-election bid. Johnson's 1865 program of presidential reconstruction extinguished any hope of enforcing black suffrage in the aftermath of the Civil War, as re-empowered Southern whites were no longer willing to accept sweeping changes to the pre-war status quo.

=== Return of Congress ===
Though not all Republicans favored black suffrage, the passage of the Black Codes and the restoration to power of former Confederate leaders elicited widespread outrage in the party. On its return in December 1865, Congress refused to seat the Southern Congressmen who had been elected by the governments established under Johnson. It also established the Joint Committee on Reconstruction, led by Moderate Republican Senator William P. Fessenden, to investigate conditions in the South. Despite these moves, most members of Congress were reluctant to directly confront the president, and initially only sought to fine-tune Johnson's policies towards the South. According to Trefousse, "If there was a time when Johnson could have come to an agreement with the moderates of the Republican Party, it was the period following the return of Congress".

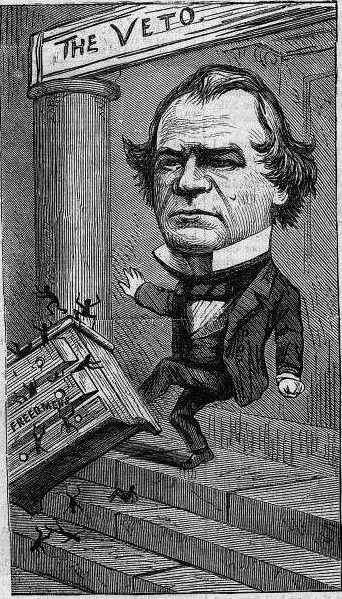
Thomas Nast cartoon of Johnson disposing of the Freedmen's Bureau as African Americans go flying

Illinois Senator Lyman Trumbull, leader of the Moderate Republicans and chairman of the Judiciary Committee, was anxious to reach an understanding with the president. He ushered through Congress a bill extending the Freedmen's Bureau beyond its scheduled abolition in 1867, as well as a civil rights bill. The civil rights bill granted birthright citizenship to all individuals born in the United States, with the exception of Native Americans, and declared that no state could violate the fundamental rights of U.S. citizens. Trumbull met several times with Johnson and became convinced that the president would sign the measures. To the delight of white Southerners and the puzzled anger of Republican legislators, Johnson vetoed the Freedman's Bureau bill on February 18, 1866. By late January 1866, Johnson had become convinced that winning a showdown with the Radical Republicans was necessary to his political plans – both for the success of Reconstruction and for re-election in 1868. In his veto message, he argued that the Freedman's Bureau was an unconstitutional and unwise exercise of federal power, and added that Congress should not consider major legislation while the eleven former Confederate states were not represented in Congress. Johnson considered himself vindicated when a move to override his veto failed in the Senate the following day. Johnson believed that the Radicals would now be isolated and defeated, and that the Moderate Republicans would form behind him; he did not understand that Moderates too wanted to see African Americans treated fairly.

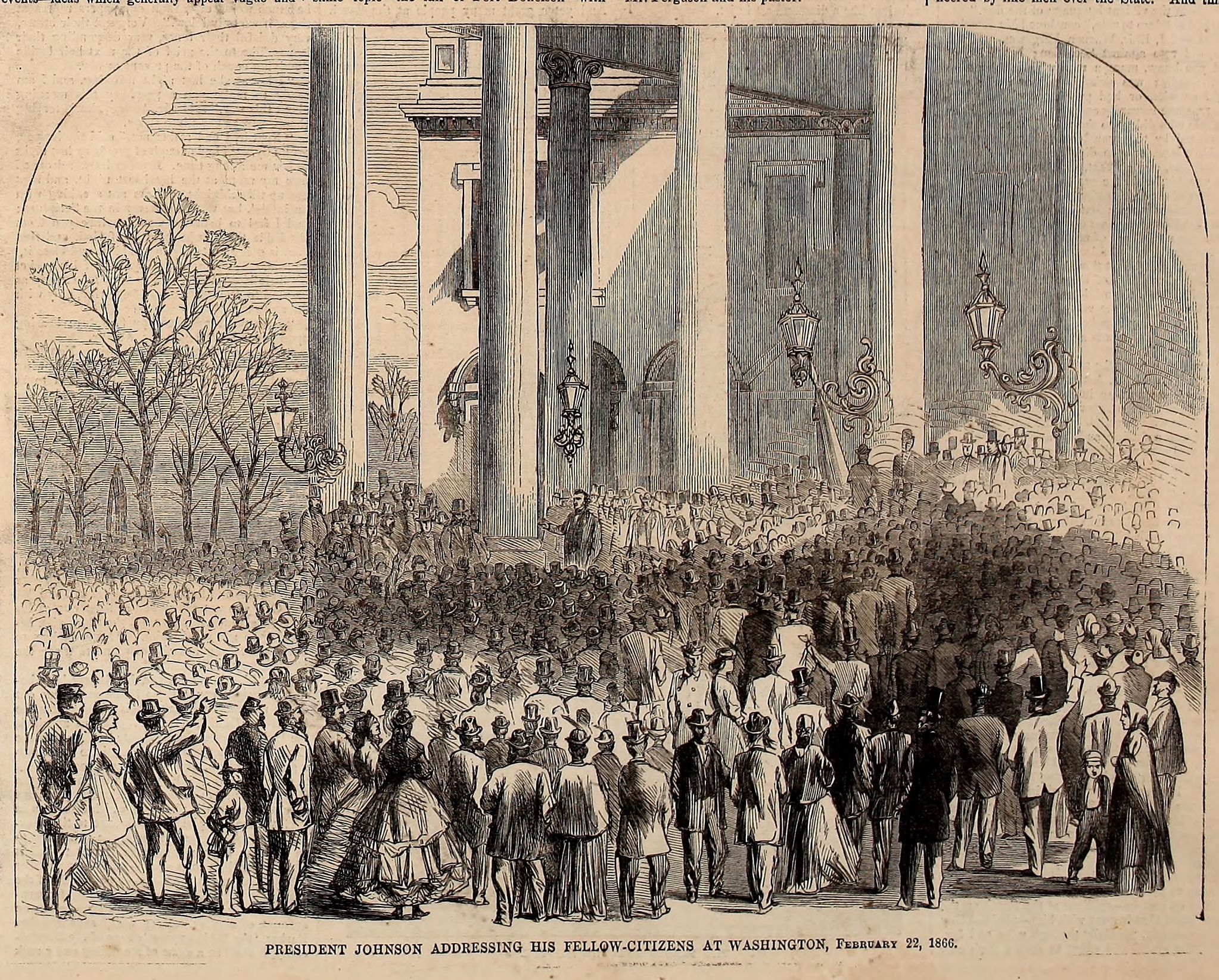
"President Johnson addressing his fellow-citizens at Washington, February 22, 1866" (Harper's Weekly, March 10, 1866)

On February 22, 1866, Washington's Birthday, Johnson gave an impromptu speech to supporters who had marched to the White House and called for an address in honor of George Washington. In his hour-long speech, he instead referred to himself over 200 times. More damagingly, he also spoke of "men ... still opposed to the Union" to whom he could not extend the hand of friendship he gave to the South. When called upon by the crowd to say who they were, Johnson named Pennsylvania Congressman Thaddeus Stevens, Massachusetts Senator Charles Sumner, and abolitionist Wendell Phillips, and accused them of plotting his assassination. Republicans viewed the address as a declaration of war, while one Democratic ally estimated Johnson's speech cost Democratic Party 200,000 votes in the 1866 congressional midterm elections.

=== Break with the Republicans ===
Even after the veto of the Freedman's Bureau bill, Moderate Republicans were hopeful that Johnson would sign the Civil Rights Act of 1866, which had passed Congress with nearly unanimous support from Republicans. Though most of Johnson's cabinet urged him to sign the Civil Rights Act, the president vetoed it, marking a permanent break with the moderate faction of the Republican Party. In his veto message, Johnson argued that the bill discriminated against whites and a dangerous expansion of federal power. Within three weeks, Congress had overridden his veto, the first time that had been done on a major bill in American history. According to Stewart, the veto was "for many his defining blunder, setting a tone of perpetual confrontation with Congress that prevailed for the rest of his presidency". Congress also passed the Freedmen's Bureau Act a second time, and again the president vetoed it; this time, the veto was overridden.

Congressional Republicans were angered by Johnson's obstruction of Congress's Reconstruction program, which eventually led to his impeachment. The battle over Reconstruction encouraged both radical and moderate Republicans to seek Constitutional guarantees for black rights, rather than relying on temporary political majorities. Congress had already begun to consider amendments to address the issue of black suffrage and congressional apportionment in light of the abolition of slavery. In late April, the Joint Committee on Reconstruction proposed an amendment that addressed most of the major issues facing Congress. The first section of the proposed amendment enshrined the principle of birthright citizenship in the constitution, and required states to observe the principles of due process and equal protection of the law. Other sections temporarily disenfranchised former Confederate officials, prohibited the payment of Confederate debts, and provided for the reduction congressional representation in proportion to the number of male voters denied suffrage. Johnson was strongly opposed to this proposed Fourteenth Amendment, which he saw as a repudiation of his administration's actions, and he used his influence to oppose the measure. Despite unanimous opposition from congressional Democrats, the amendment passed both houses of Congress in June 1866 and was formally proposed to the states for ratification.

While Johnson clashed with Congress over Reconstruction, ex-Confederates and other Southerners used increasingly violent methods to oppose federal authority and re-establish their own dominance. Through a mix of legal and extra-legal means, many African-Americans were forced into a coercive labor system that left most blacks without true economic freedom. Concerns about cost and a large standing army led Congress to authorize a 54,000-man peacetime army, which was three times the size of the 1860 force but dramatically smaller than the 1865 force. Overstretched army forces kept order in towns and cities, but were forced to withdraw from most rural areas. Even in cities, mobs attacked African-Americans, "carpetbaggers" (Northerners who moved to the South during Reconstruction), and federal forces in upheavals such as the Memphis riots and the New Orleans riot. These riots shocked many in the North and discredited Johnson's Reconstruction policies, resulting in increased support for a continued federal presence in the South.

=== 1866 mid-term elections ===
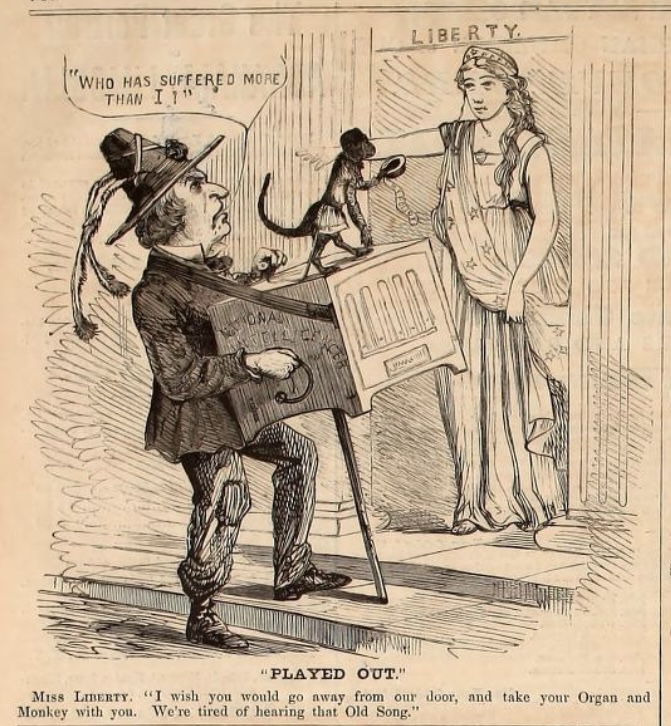
This Thomas Nast political cartoon published in Harper's Weekly in late 1866 criticized Andrew Johnson for his self-pitying stump-speech refrain, "Who, I ask, has suffered more for the Union than I have?"

Facing opposition in Congress, Johnson sought to boost his supporters in the November 1866 congressional elections. In August 1866, Johnson held the National Union Convention, using the label that the Republican ticket had campaigned on during the 1864 presidential election. Johnson hoped to unite his conservative supporters into a new party, but the convention ended only with a pledge by attendees to support Johnson and his policies in the 1866 campaign. Republican supporters like Seward and Thurlow Weed, and Democratic supporters like Samuel L. M. Barlow, were unwilling to fully break with their party. Following the convention, Johnson campaigned vigorously, undertaking a public speaking tour known as the "Swing Around the Circle". The trip, including speeches in Chicago, St. Louis, Indianapolis and Columbus, proved politically disastrous, as the president made controversial comparisons between himself and Christ and engaged in arguments with hecklers. These exchanges were attacked as beneath the dignity of the presidency. The Republicans won major gains in Congress and made plans to control Reconstruction. Johnson blamed the Democrats for giving only lukewarm support to the National Union movement.

=== Radical Reconstruction ===
==== First Reconstruction Act ====
Map of the five military districts established by the First Reconstruction Act First Military District Second Military District Third Military District Fourth Military District Fifth Military District

Reconvening in December 1866, an energized Congress began passing legislation, often over a presidential veto. In February 1867, Congress admitted Nebraska to the Union over a veto. As a result, the Republican majority in the Senate grew by two, and the Fourteenth Amendment gained one ratification vote. Another bill passed over Johnson's veto granted voting rights to African Americans in the District of Columbia. Johnson also vetoed legislation admitting Colorado Territory to the Union, but Congress failed to override it, as enough senators agreed that a district with a population of only 30,000 was not yet worthy of statehood.

Meanwhile, state legislatures in every former Confederate state—with the exception of Tennessee—refused to ratify the Fourteenth Amendment. This refusal prompted Congressman Thaddeus Stevens to introduce legislation to dissolve the Southern state governments and reconstitute them into five military districts, under martial law. State governments would be reformed after holding constitutional conventions. African Americans could vote for or become delegates to these conventions, while former Confederates could not. During the legislative process, Congress added to the bill a provision requiring that restoration to the Union would follow the state's ratification of the Fourteenth Amendment. Johnson and the Southerners attempted a compromise, whereby the South would agree to a modified version of the amendment that did not include the disqualification of former Confederates and that limited black suffrage. The Republicans insisted on the full language of the amendment, and the deal fell through. Johnson vetoed the resulting First Reconstruction Act on March 2, 1867, but Congress overrode his veto on the same day.

The First Reconstruction Act served as the legislative centerpiece of Radical Reconstruction, as Congress fully seized leadership of Reconstruction from Johnson. Though Johnson retained the power to command and undermine the army and the Freedmen's Bureau, the First Reconstruction Act asserted Congress's ability to protect the rights of African Americans and prevent ex-Confederates from re-establishing political dominance. Following the passage of the act, African-Americans began to participate in elections en masse for the first time; the share of black adult males registered to vote rose from 0.5% in December 1866 to 80.5% in December 1867, with all of that increase occurring in former Confederate states. As the Democratic Party was dominated by whites hostile to black voting rights, African Americans overwhelmingly chose to join the Republican Party. Aside from protecting African-American voting rights and disqualifying ex-Confederates from voting, the First Reconstruction Act also required the appointment of commanders for five districts that covered all of the former Confederate state other than Tennessee, which had been re-admitted in 1866. In consultation with General Grant, Johnson appointed Generals John Schofield, Daniel Sickles, John Pope, Edward Ord, and Philip Sheridan to command the five districts.

==== Later Reconstruction Acts ====
To ensure that Johnson would not have a free hand over Reconstruction, as he had had in 1865, the 39th United States Congress passed a law that called the 40th Congress into session in March 1867 rather than in December 1867, when it would usually have convened. One of the first actions taken by the 40th Congress was to pass the Second Reconstruction Act, doing so over Johnson's veto. The act provided for the registration of only those voters that could show their loyalty to the Union, as well as the calling of state conventions to create new governments.

Johnson's Attorney General, Henry Stanbery, asserted that the governments established by Johnson, rather than the military governments established by Congress, reigned supreme in the South. Disturbed by Johnson's defiance, Congress reconvened in July to pass the Third Reconstruction Act over Johnson's veto. The act established the supremacy of the military governments in the South, and gave the military the power to remove state officials from office. After Secretary of War Edwin Stanton opposed Johnson's decision to veto the Third Reconstruction Act, Johnson decided to remove Stanton, setting the stage for a battle that would consume much of the second half of his presidency.

Throughout 1867, Southern politics polarized along partisan lines. Most Southern whites favored the Democratic Party, while the Republican Party in the South consisted of African-Americans, carpetbaggers, and "scalawags", Southern whites who had largely opposed secession and now aligned with the Republicans. By early 1868, every former Confederate state but Texas had convened a constitutional convention and produced a new state constitution. As the conventions had been dominated by Republicans, the new state constitutions mandated suffrage for men (except leading ex-Confederates) without regard to race or property. Under the Reconstruction Acts, the new constitutions required ratification by a majority of registered voters to take effect. Southern Democrats boycotted the ratification votes, and groups such as the Ku Klux Klan engaged in terrorist campaigns to suppress voter turnout. In February 1868, Congress passed the Fourth Reconstruction over Johnson's veto. The act allowed for the ratification of new state constitutions with the approval of a majority of those voting, rather than a majority of those registered to vote.

== Impeachment ==
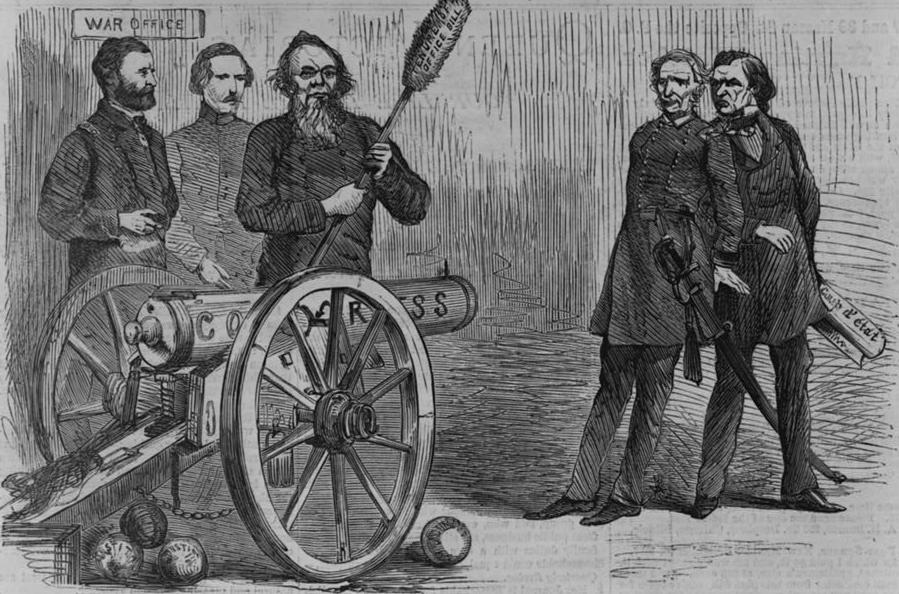
"The Situation", a Harper's Weekly editorial cartoon shows Secretary of War Stanton aiming a cannon labeled "Congress" to defeat Johnson. The rammer is "Tenure of Office Bill" and cannonballs on the floor are "Justice".

=== Removal of Stanton ===
On March 2, 1867, in response to the president's statements indicating that he planned to fire Cabinet secretaries who did not agree with him, Congress passed the Tenure of Office Act. The act required Senate approval for the firing of Cabinet members during the tenure of the president who appointed them. The Tenure of Office Act was immediately controversial; some senators doubted that it was constitutional and questioned whether the act's terms applied to Johnson, whose key Cabinet officers were Lincoln holdovers.

The validity of the Tenure of Office Act would be tested by Johnson's clash with Secretary of War Stanton. Johnson both admired, and was exasperated by Secretary of War Stanton, who, in combination with General Grant, worked to undermine the president's Southern policy from within his own administration. Johnson considered firing Stanton, but respected him for his wartime service as secretary. Stanton, for his part, feared allowing Johnson to appoint his successor and refused to resign, despite his public disagreements with his president. In mid-1867, Johnson and Stanton battled over the question of whether the military officers placed in command of the South could override the civil authorities. The president had Attorney General Stanbery issue an opinion backing his position that they could not. On August 5, after Stanton refused to endorse Johnson's position, the president demanded Stanton's resignation. The secretary refused to quit at a time when Congress was out of session. Johnson then suspended him pending the next meeting of Congress, as permitted under the Tenure of Office Act. Grant agreed to serve as temporary replacement while continuing to lead the army.

Although Republicans expressed anger with his actions, the 1867 elections generally went Democratic. No seats in Congress were directly elected in the polling, but the Democrats took control of the Ohio General Assembly, allowing them to defeat for re-election one of Johnson's strongest opponents, Senator Benjamin Wade. Voters in Ohio, Connecticut, and Minnesota turned down propositions to grant African Americans the vote. The adverse results momentarily put a stop to Republican calls to impeach Johnson, who was elated by the election results. Nevertheless, once Congress met in November, the Judiciary Committee reversed itself and passed a resolution of impeachment against Johnson. After much debate about whether anything the president had done was a high crime or misdemeanor, the standard for impeachment under the Constitution, the resolution was defeated in the House of Representatives.

Johnson notified Congress of Stanton's suspension and Grant's interim appointment. In January 1868, the Senate disapproved of his action, and reinstated Stanton, contending the president had violated the Tenure of Office Act. Over Johnson's objection, Grant stepped down as Secretary of War, causing a complete break between the two. Johnson then dismissed Stanton and nominated Lorenzo Thomas as Stanton's replacement. Stanton still refused to leave his office, and on February 24, 1868, the House impeached the president for intentionally violating the Tenure of Office Act, by a vote of 128 to 47. The House subsequently adopted eleven articles of impeachment, for the most part alleging that he had violated the Tenure of Office Act, and had questioned the legitimacy of Congress. Johnson thus became the first U.S. president to be impeached by Congress.

=== Impeachment trial ===
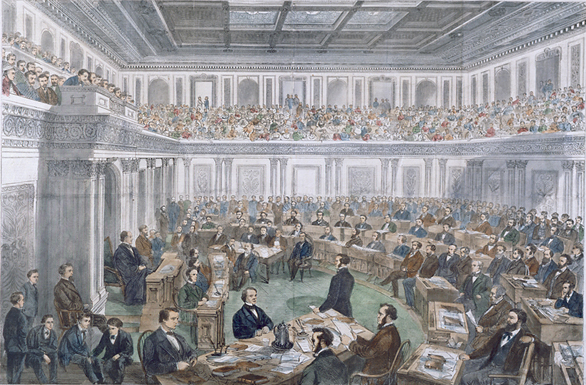
Theodore R. Davis' illustration of Johnson's impeachment trial in the United States Senate, published in Harper's Weekly

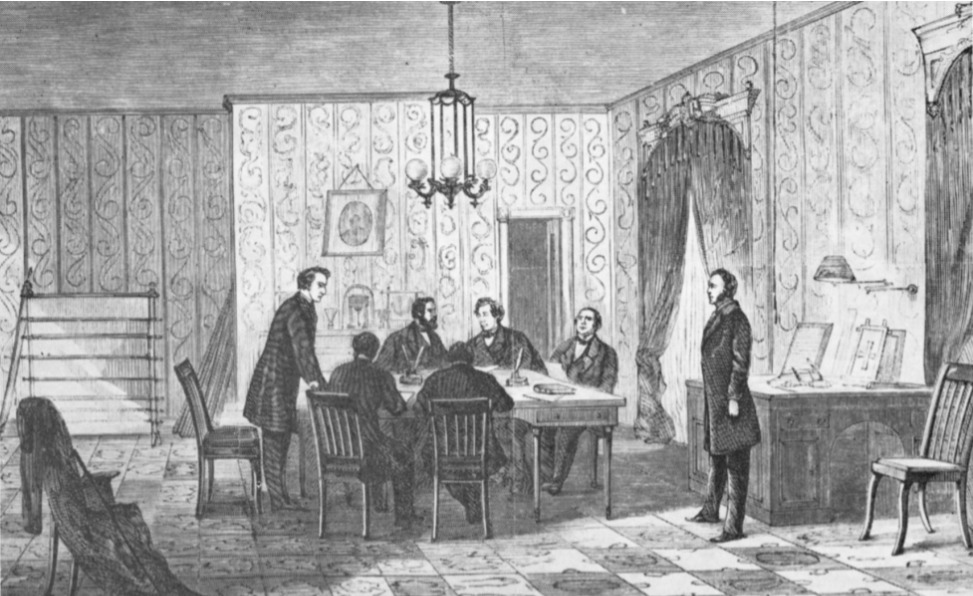
Illustration of Johnson consulting with his counsel for the trial

On March 5, 1868, the impeachment trial began in the Senate. Congressmen George S. Boutwell, Benjamin Butler, and Thaddeus Stevens acted as managers for the House, or prosecutors, while William M. Evarts, Benjamin R. Curtis and former Attorney General Stanbery were Johnson's counsel. Chief Justice Chase served as presiding judge. The defense relied on the provision of the Tenure of Office Act that made it applicable only to appointees of the current administration. Since Lincoln had appointed Stanton, the defense maintained Johnson had not violated the act; they also argued that the president had the right to test the constitutionality of an act of Congress. Johnson's counsel insisted that he make no appearance at the trial, nor publicly comment about the proceedings, and except for a pair of interviews in April, he complied.

Behind the scenes, Johnson maneuvered to gain an acquittal; for example, he pledged to Iowa Senator James W. Grimes that he would not interfere with Congress's Reconstruction efforts. Grimes reported to a group of Moderates that he believed the president would keep his word. Johnson also promised to install the respected John Schofield as War Secretary. Kansas Senator Edmund G. Ross received assurances that the new, Radical-influenced constitutions ratified in South Carolina and Arkansas would be transmitted to the Congress without delay, an action which would give him and other senators political cover to vote for acquittal. Other factors also favored a Johnson acquittal. If he was removed from office, Johnson's successor would have been Ohio Senator Wade, the president pro tempore of the Senate. Wade, a lame duck whose term would end in early 1869, was a Radical who supported such measures as women's suffrage, placing him beyond the pale politically in much of the nation. Additionally, many Republicans saw a President Wade as a potential obstacle to a Grant victory in the 1868 presidential election.

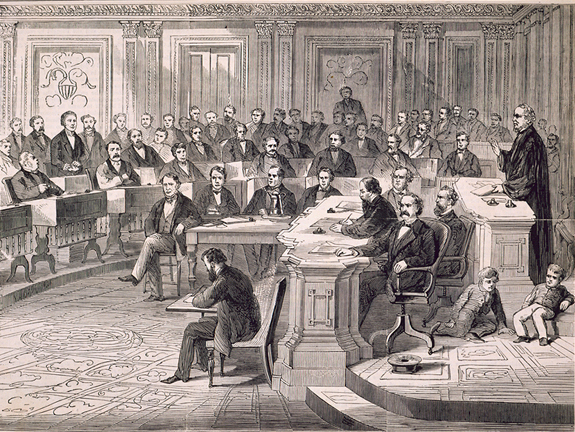
Illustration published in Frank Leslie's Illustrated Newspaper of Senator Edmund G. Ross casting his vote against conviction on the eleventh article of impeachment

With the dealmaking, Johnson was confident of the result in advance of the verdict, and in the days leading up to the ballot, newspapers reported that Stevens and his Radicals had given up. On May 16, the Senate voted on the 11th article of impeachment, accusing Johnson of firing Stanton in violation of the Tenure of Office of Act once the Senate had overturned his suspension. 35 senators voted "guilty" and 19 "not guilty", and thus the Senate fell short by a single vote of the two-thirds majority required for conviction under the Constitution. Seven Republicans—Senators Grimes, Ross, Trumbull, William Pitt Fessenden, Joseph S. Fowler, John B. Henderson, and Peter G. Van Winkle—joined their Democratic colleagues in voting to acquit the president. After the vote, the Senate adjourned for the Republican National Convention, which nominated Grant for president. The Senate returned on May 26 and voted on the second and third articles, with identical 35–19 results. Faced with those results, Johnson's opponents gave up and dismissed proceedings. Stanton "relinquished" his office on May 26, and the Senate subsequently confirmed Schofield as Secretary of War When Johnson renominated Stanbery to return to his position as Attorney General after his service as a defense manager, the Senate refused to confirm him.

Allegations were made at the time and again later that bribery dictated the outcome of the trial. Even when it was in progress, Representative Butler began an investigation, held hearings, and issued a report, which was not endorsed by any other congressman. Butler focused on a New York–based "Astor House Group", supposedly led by political boss and editor Thurlow Weed. This organization was said to have raised large sums of money from whiskey interests through Cincinnati lawyer Charles Woolley to bribe senators to acquit Johnson. Butler went so far as to imprison Woolley in the Capitol building when he refused to answer questions, but failed to prove bribery.

=== Aftermath ===
State ratification of the Fourteenth Amendment: Ratified amendment pre-certification, 1866–1868 Ratified amendment pre-certification after first rejecting it, 1868 Ratified amendment post-certification after first rejecting it, 1869–1976 Ratified amendment post-certification, 1959 Ratified amendment, withdrew ratification (rescission), then re-ratified. Oregon rescinded ratification post-certification and was included in the official count Territories of the United States in 1868, not yet states

For the remaining months of his term, Johnson was a nonentity with little influence on public policy. In the months after the impeachment vote, Congress re-admitted the seven Southern states that had written new constitutions and ratified the Fourteenth Amendment. As Radical Republicans feared that these Southern states would deny African-Americans the right to vote in 1868 or future elections, they also drafted what would become the Fifteenth Amendment, which prohibited the restriction of suffrage on the basis of "race, color, or previous condition of servitude." Congress overrode Johnson's veto of the re-admission of the Southern states, as well as Johnson's veto of a bill denying electoral votes to the states that had not yet been reorganized. Shortly before it adjourned in July 1868, Congress adopted a concurrent resolution declaring the Fourteenth Amendment to be a part of the Constitution, as the requisite number of states had ratified the amendment. Though it made provisions for a reconvening in September should Johnson defy its policies, Congress did not reconvene until after the 1868 election.

== Other domestic policies ==
=== Treasury policies ===
The Civil War had been financed primarily by issuing short-term and long-term bonds and loans, plus inflation caused by printing paper money, plus new taxes. Wholesale prices had more than doubled, and reduction of inflation was a priority for Secretary of the Treasury Hugh McCulloch. A high priority, and by far the most controversial, was the currency question. The old paper currency issued by state banks had been withdrawn, and Confederate currency was worthless. The national banks had issued $207 million in currency, which was backed by gold and silver. The federal treasury had issued $428 million in greenbacks, which was legal tender but not backed by gold or silver. In addition about $275 million of coin was in circulation. The new administration policy announced in October would be to make all the paper convertible into specie, if Congress so voted. The House of Representatives passed the Alley Resolution on December 18, 1865, by vote of 144 to 6. In the Senate it was a different matter, for the key player was Senator John Sherman, who said that inflation contraction was not nearly as important as refunding the short-term and long-term national debt. The war had been largely financed by national debt, in addition to taxation and inflation. The national debt stood at $2.8 billion. By October 1865, most of it in short term and temporary loans. Wall Street bankers typified by Jay Cooke believed that the economy was about to grow rapidly, thanks to the development of agriculture through the Homestead Act, the expansion of railroads, especially rebuilding the devastated Southern railroads and in opening the transcontinental line to the West Coast, and especially the flourishing of manufacturing during the war. The goal premium over greenbacks was hundred and $145 in greenbacks to $100 in gold, and the optimists thought that the heavy demand for currency in an era of prosperity would return the ratio to 100. A compromise was reached in April 1866, that limited the treasury to a currency contraction of only $10 million over six months. Meanwhile, the Senate refunded the entire national debt, but the House failed to act. By early 1867, postwar prosperity was a reality, and the optimists wanted an end to contraction, which Congress ordered in January 1868. Meanwhile, the Treasury issued new bonds at a lower interest rate to refinance the redemption of short-term debt. while the old state bank notes were disappearing from circulation, new national bank notes, backed by species, were expanding. By 1868 inflation was minimal.

=== Land and labor policies ===
In June 1866, Johnson signed the Southern Homestead Act into law, in hopes that legislation would assist poor whites. Around 28,000 land claims were successfully patented, although few former slaves benefited from the law, fraud was rampant, and much of the best land was reserved for railroads. In June 1868, Johnson signed a law passed by Congress that established an eight-hour workday for laborers and mechanics employed by the federal government. Although Johnson told members of a Workingmen's party delegation in Baltimore that he could not directly commit himself to an eight-hour day, he nevertheless told the same delegation that he greatly favored the "shortest number of hours consistent with the interests of all." According to Richard F. Selcer, however, the good intentions behind the law were "immediately frustrated," as wages were cut by 20%.

=== Nebraska statehood ===
In June 1866, Nebraska Territory voters narrowly approved a draft constitution; one of its provisions limited voting rights to white males. A bill to admit Nebraska to the union was then introduced in Congress, where it was adopted just before the session ended in late July, notwithstanding some resistance from Republicans who opposed the "white suffrage" clause in the new constitution, as well as Democrats who were leery of granting statehood to another Republican stronghold. President Johnson pocket vetoed the bill after Congress adjourned.

The issue was renewed shortly after Congress reconvened in December 1866. This time, however, an amendment sponsored by Senator George F. Edmunds effectively conditioned statehood on the acceptance by the territory of a prohibition against voting restrictions based on race or color. The amendment won the support of radical Republicans and others hoping to impose similar conditions on the former Confederate states. But it drew fire from Democrats and Johnson, who opposed the condition on constitutional grounds. They argued that the federal government could not infringe on the power of states to establish their own qualifications for suffrage. The issue of statehood had become a question of federalism, as well as a tug of war between the president and Congress. Despite Johnson's objections, Congress passed admission legislation for Nebraska in January 1867. Johnson vetoed the measure that same month. Less than two weeks after Johnson vetoed the Nebraska statehood bill, both houses of Congress voted overwhelmingly to override it. The territorial legislature quickly accepted the condition imposed by the Edmunds Amendment, thus eliminating racial restrictions on voting. On March 1, 1867, Nebraska became the first–and to this day the only–state to be admitted to the Union by means of a veto override.

== Foreign policy ==
The Treaty of Cession of Russian America, Alaska, to the United States March 30, 1S67 A copy of the Leutze painting- of this great event. On the left shows Vladimir Bodisco, Secretary of the Russian Legation, and then in order to the right William Seward, Secretary of State of the United States of America, seated; William Hunter, Second Assistant Secretary of State ; K. S. Chew, Chief Clerk. Department of State ; His Excellency, Edward Stoeckel, Russian Plenipotentiary, with his hand pointing to the globe; Charles Sumner, of Massachusetts, Senator of the United States; Frederick W. Seward, First Assistant Secretary of State. The surroundings represent the office of the Secretary of State in the temporary rented quarters in the Children's Orphans Asylum on 14th street near Boundary, N. W., during the erection of the present massive structure

=== Mexico ===
France had established the Second Mexican Empire in 1863, despite American warnings that this was an unacceptable violation of the Monroe Doctrine. The French army propped up Emperor Maximilian I of Mexico and defeated local political opposition led by Benito Juárez. Once the Confederacy was defeated, Johnson and Grant sent General Phil Sheridan with 50,000 combat veterans to the Texas-Mexico border to emphasize the demand that France withdraw. Johnson provided arms to Juarez, and imposed a naval blockade. In response, Napoleon III informed the Johnson administration that all his troops would be brought home by November 1867. Maximilian was eventually captured and executed in June 1867.

=== Expansionism and Alaska Purchase ===
Seward was an expansionist, and sought opportunities to gain territory for the United States. In 1867, he negotiated a treaty with Denmark to purchase the Danish West Indies for $7.5 million, but the Senate refused to ratify it. Seward also proposed to acquire British Columbia as a trade-off against the Alabama Claims, but the British were uninterested in this proposal. Seward was successful in staking an American claim to uninhabited Wake Island in the Pacific, which would be officially claimed by the U.S. in 1898.

By 1867, the Russian government saw its North American colony (today Alaska) as a financial liability, and feared eventually losing it if a war broke out with Britain. Russian minister Eduard de Stoeckl was instructed to sell Alaska to the United States, and did so deftly, convincing Seward to raise his initial offer from $5 million to $7.2 million. This sum is the inflation-adjusted equivalent to $166 million in present-day terms. On March 30, 1867, de Stoeckl and Seward signed the treaty, and President Johnson summoned the Senate into session and it approved the Alaska Purchase in 37–2 vote. Although ridiculed in some quarters as "Seward's Folly," American public opinion was generally quite favorable in terms of the potential for economic benefits at a bargain price, maintaining the friendship of Russia, and blocking British expansion.

Another treaty that failed was the Johnson-Clarendon convention, negotiated in settlement of the Alabama Claims, for damages to American shipping from British-built Confederate raiders. Negotiated by the United States Minister to Britain, former Maryland senator Reverdy Johnson, in late 1868, it was ignored by the Senate during the remainder of Johnson's term. The treaty was rejected after he left office, and the Grant administration later negotiated a treaty with considerably better terms for the United States.

=== Fenian raids ===
The Fenians, a secret Irish Catholic militant organization, recruited heavily among Civil War veterans in preparation to invade Canada. The group's goal was to force Britain to grant Ireland its independence. The Fenians counted thousands of members, but they had a confused command structure, competing factions, unfamiliar new weapons, and British agents in their ranks who alerted the Canadians. Their invasion forces were too small and had poor leadership. Several attempts were organized, but they were either canceled at the last minute or failed in a matter of hours. The largest raid took place on May 31–June 2, 1866, when about 1000 Fenians crossed the Niagara River. The Canadians were forewarned, and over 20,000 Canadian militia and British regulars turned out. A few men on each side were killed and the Fenians soon retreated home. The Johnson administration at first quietly tolerated this violation of American neutrality, but, by 1867, dispatched the U.S. Army to prevent further Fenian raids. A second attack in 1870 was broken up by the United States Marshal for Vermont.

== 1868 election and transition ==
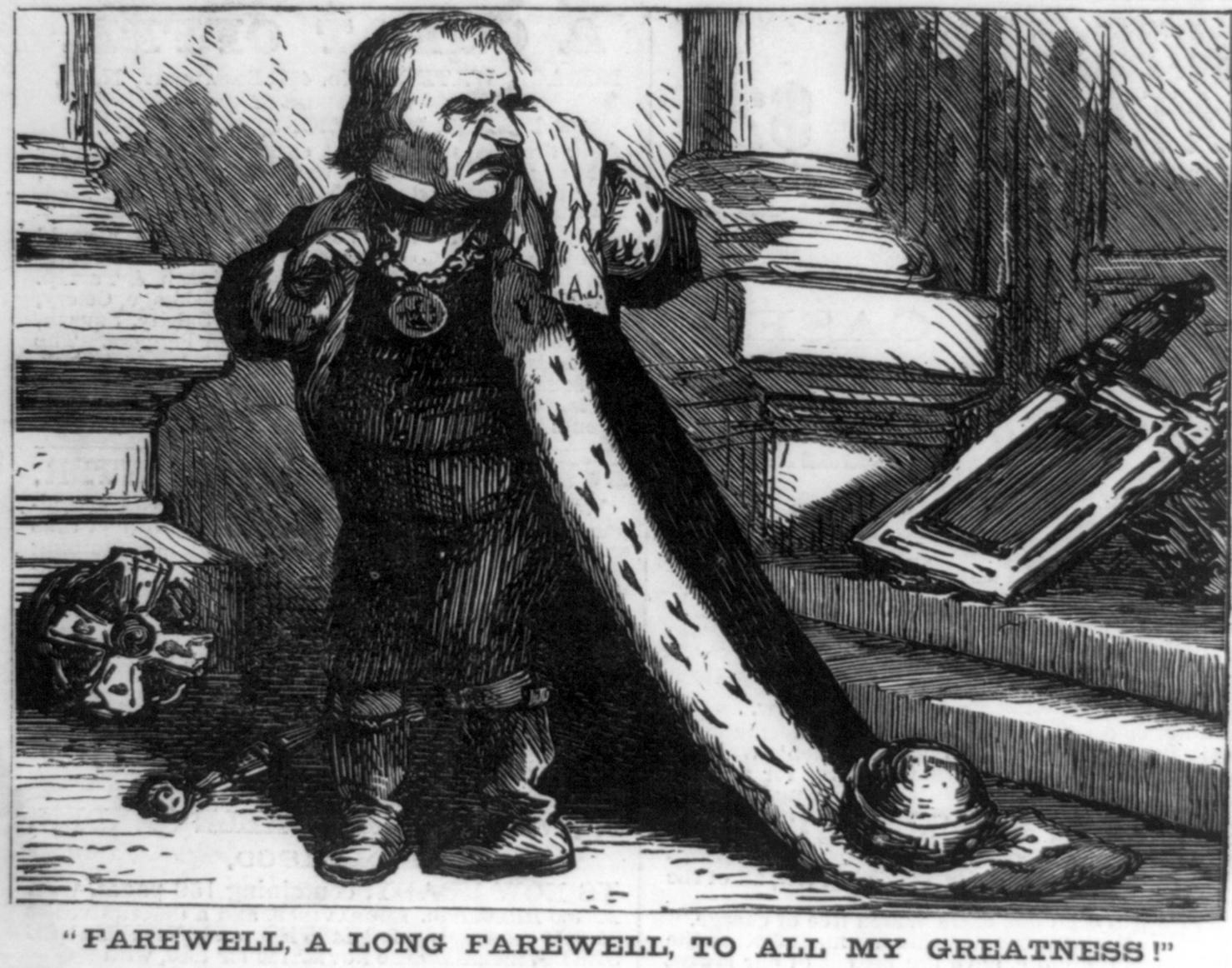
"Farewell to all my greatness": Harper's Weekly cartoon mocking Johnson on leaving office

Ulysses S. Grant emerged as the likely Republican presidential candidate during the two years preceding the election. Though he had agreed to replace Stanton as Secretary of War, Grant split with Johnson over Reconstruction and other issues. So great was Grant's support among Republicans that many in Congress were reluctant to impeach Johnson due to the fear that it would prevent Grant from becoming president. Grant's backing came primarily from the moderate wing of the party, as many Radical Republicans feared that Grant would pursue conservative policies in office. The 1868 Republican National Convention chose Grant as the party's presidential nominee and Speaker of the House Schuyler Colfax as the vice presidential nominee. Perhaps chastened by Congress's failure to convict Johnson, the party's platform did not endorse universal male suffrage.

Having failed to build his own party, Johnson sought nomination by the 1868 Democratic National Convention in New York in July 1868. Johnson remained very popular among Southern whites, and he boosted that popularity by issuing, just before the convention, a pardon ending the possibility of criminal proceedings against any Confederate not already indicted, meaning that only Davis and a few others still might face trial. Aside from Johnson, other contenders for the Democratic nomination included former Ohio representative George H. Pendleton, who was relatively unconcerned about Reconstruction and focused his appeal on the continued use of greenbacks, former New York governor Horatio Seymour, who had support among the party's conservative establishment but was reluctant to enter the race, and Chief Justice Salmon Chase. On the first ballot of the convention, Johnson finished second to Pendleton, and Johnson's support fell away as the ballots passed. Seymour won the nomination on the 22nd ballot, while Johnson received only four votes, all from Tennessee. For vice president, the Democrats nominated Francis Preston Blair Jr., who campaigned on a promise to use the army to destroy the Southern governments that, he said, were led by "a semi-barborous race of blacks" who sought to "subject the white women to their unbridled lust."

The Democratic party platform embraced Johnson's presidency, thanking him for his "patriotic efforts" in "resisting the aggressions of Congress upon the Constitutional rights of the States and the people." Nonetheless, Johnson was embittered by his defeat, and some of his backers suggested the formation of a third party. Seymour's operatives sought Johnson's support, but Johnson remained silent for most of the presidential campaign. It was not until October, with the vote already having taken place in some states, that Johnson mentioned Seymour at all, and he never endorsed him. The campaign centered largely on Reconstruction, and many Democrats hoped that a Seymour victory would lead to the end of Reconstruction and black suffrage.

Republican Ulysses S. Grant defeated Democrat Horatio Seymour in the 1868 election

Grant won the election, taking 52.7% of the popular vote and 214 of the 294 electoral votes. The election saw a new wave of violence across the South, as the Ku Klux Klan and other groups again sought to suppress the black vote. Seymour won Georgia and Louisiana, but Grant won the remaining former Confederate states that had been restored to the Union. Grant also carried the vast majority of Northern states, though Seymour won his home state of New York.

Johnson regretted Grant's victory, in part because of their animus from the Stanton affair. In his annual message to Congress in December, Johnson urged the repeal of the Tenure of Office Act and told legislators that, had they admitted their Southern colleagues in 1865, all would have been well. On Christmas Day 1868, Johnson issued a final amnesty, this one covering everyone, including Jefferson Davis. He also issued, in his final months in office, pardons for crimes, including one for Dr. Samuel Mudd, controversially convicted of involvement in the Lincoln assassination (he had set Booth's broken leg) and imprisoned in Fort Jefferson on Florida's Dry Tortugas. In February 1869, Congress approved the Fifteenth Amendment, sending it to the states for ratification. On March 4, 1869, the final day of his presidency, Johnson refused to attend Grant's inauguration.

== Historical reputation ==
In the decades after Johnson left office, there were few historical evaluations of Johnson and his presidency. Memoirs from Northerners who had dealt with him, such as former vice president Henry Wilson and Maine Senator James G. Blaine, depicted him as an obstinate boor whose Reconstruction policies favored the South. The turn of the 20th century saw the first significant historical evaluations of Johnson. Leading the wave was Pulitzer Prize-winning historian James Ford Rhodes, who ascribed Johnson's faults to his personal weaknesses, and blamed him for the problems of the postbellum South. Other early 20th-century historians, such as John Burgess, Woodrow Wilson, and William Dunning, all Southerners, concurred with Rhodes, believing Johnson flawed and politically inept, but concluding that he had tried to carry out Lincoln's plans for the South in good faith. Author and journalist Jay Tolson suggests that Wilson "depict[ed Reconstruction] as a vindictive program that hurt even repentant southerners while benefiting northern opportunists, the so-called Carpetbaggers, and cynical white southerners, or Scalawags, who exploited alliances with blacks for political gain".

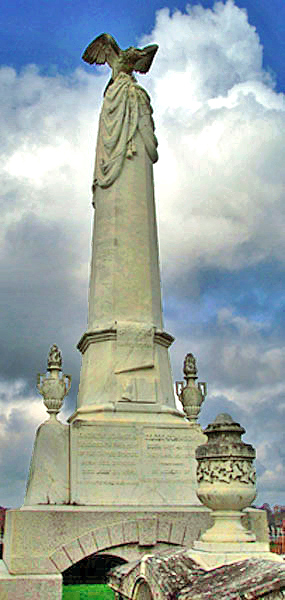
The grave of Andrew Johnson, Greeneville, Tennessee

Even as Rhodes and his school wrote, another group of historians was setting out on the full rehabilitation of Johnson, using for the first time primary sources such as Johnson's papers and the diaries of Gideon Welles. The resulting volumes, such as David Miller DeWitt's The Impeachment and Trial of President Andrew Johnson (1903), presented him far more favorably than they did those who had sought to oust him. In James Schouler's 1913 History of the Reconstruction Period, the author accused Rhodes of being "quite unfair to Johnson", though agreeing that the former president had created many of his own problems through inept political moves. These works had an effect; although historians continued to view Johnson as having deep flaws which sabotaged his presidency, they saw his Reconstruction policies as fundamentally correct. A series of highly favorable biographies in the late 1920s and early 1930s that "glorified Johnson and condemned his enemies" accelerated this trend. In 1948, a poll of historians conducted by Arthur M. Schlesinger deemed Johnson among the average presidents; in 1956, one by Clinton L. Rossiter named him as one of the near-great chief executives. Foner notes that at the time of these surveys, "the Reconstruction era that followed the Civil War was regarded as a time of corruption and misgovernment caused by granting black men the right to vote".

In the 1950s, historians began to focus on the African-American experience as central to Reconstruction. They rejected completely any claim of black inferiority, which had marked many earlier historical works. Many of these writers saw the developing Civil Rights Movement as a second Reconstruction and hoped their work on the postbellum era would advance the cause of civil rights. These authors sympathized with the Radical Republicans for their desire to help African Americans, and saw Johnson as callous towards the freedman. In a number of works from 1956 onwards by such historians as Fawn Brodie, the former president was depicted as a successful saboteur of efforts to better the freedman's lot. Reconstruction was increasingly seen as a noble effort to integrate the freed slaves into society.

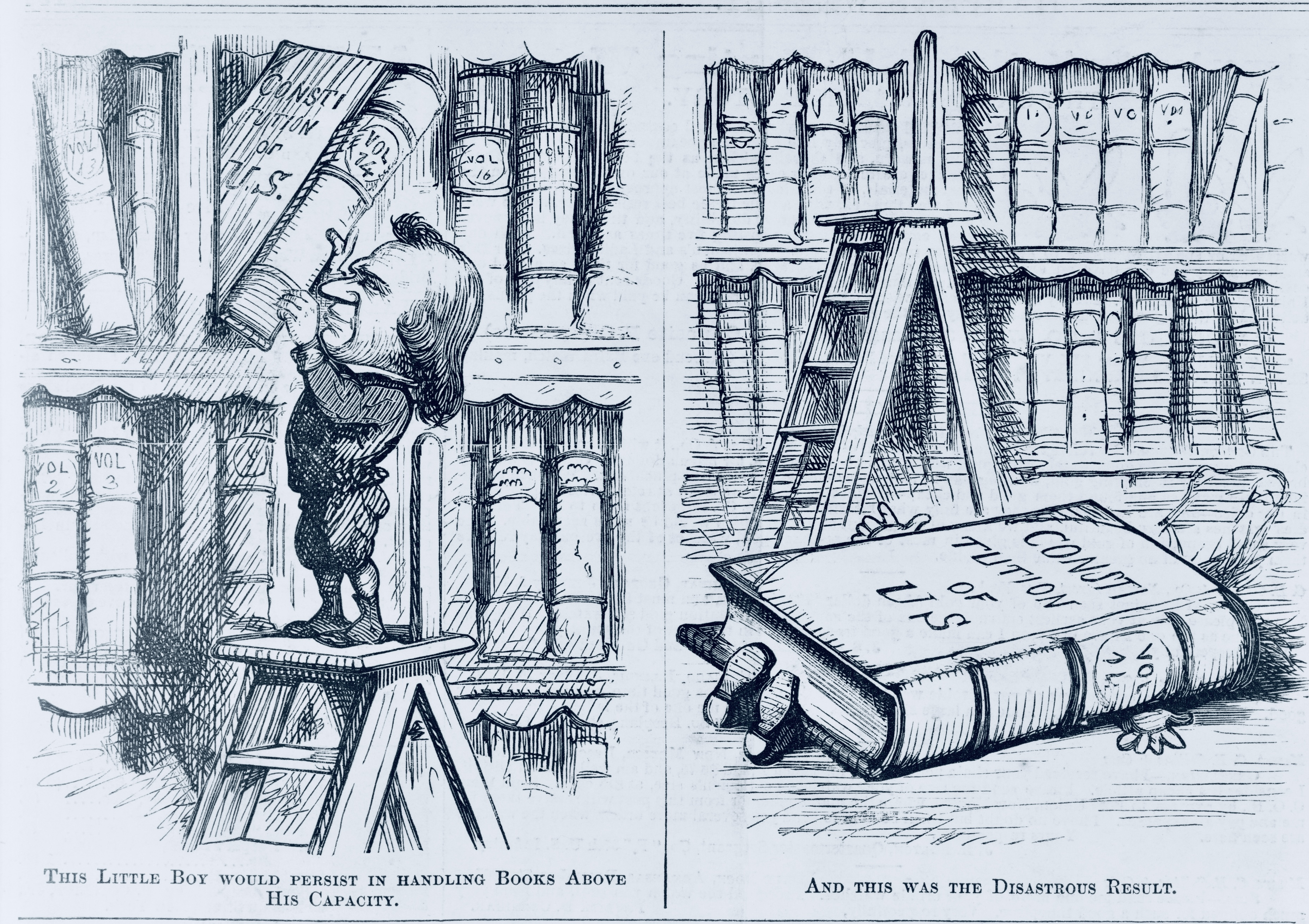
"This little boy would persist in handling books above his capacity...And this was the disastrous result" (Thomas Nast, Harper's Weekly, 1868)

In the early 21st century, Johnson is among those commonly mentioned as the worst presidents in U.S. history. According to historian Glenn W. Lafantasie, who believes Buchanan the worst president, "Johnson is a particular favorite for the bottom of the pile because of his impeachment ... his complete mishandling of Reconstruction policy ... his bristling personality, and his enormous sense of self-importance." Tolson suggests that "Johnson is now scorned for having resisted Radical Republican policies aimed at securing the rights and well-being of the newly emancipated African-Americans". Gordon-Reed notes that Johnson, along with his contemporaries Pierce and Buchanan, are generally listed among the five worst presidents, but states, "there have never been more difficult times in the life of this nation. The problems these men had to confront were enormous. It would have taken a succession of Lincolns to do them justice." Trefousse considers Johnson's legacy to be "the maintenance of white supremacy. His boost to Southern conservatives by undermining Reconstruction was his legacy to the nation, one that would trouble the country for generations to come."

A 2018 poll of the American Political Science Association's Presidents and Executive Politics section ranked Johnson as the second-worst president. A 2017 C-SPAN poll of historians ranked Johnson as the second-worst president. A 2006 poll of historians ranked Johnson's decision to oppose greater equality for African Americans in the aftermath of the Civil War as the second-worst mistake ever made by a sitting president. Historian Elizabeth R. Varon writes:

For the most part, historians view Andrew Johnson as the worst possible person to have served as President at the end of the American Civil War. Because of his gross incompetence in federal office and his incredible miscalculation of the extent of public support for his policies, Johnson is judged as a great failure in making a satisfying and just peace. He is viewed to have been a rigid, dictatorial racist who was unable to compromise or to accept a political reality at odds with his own ideas...Most importantly, Johnson's strong commitment to obstructing political and civil rights for blacks is principally responsible for the failure of Reconstruction to solve the race problem in the South and perhaps in America as well.

== See also ==
- Amphitheatrum Johnsonianum

== Bibliography ==
- Beale, Howard K. (July 1940). "On rewriting Reconstruction history". American Historical Review. 45 (4). Washington, D.C.: American Historical Association: 807–827. doi:10.2307/1854452. JSTOR 1854452.
- Castel, Albert E. (1979). The Presidency of Andrew Johnson. American Presidency. Lawrence, Kan.: The Regents Press of Kansas. ISBN 0-7006-0190-2.
- Fitzgerald, Michael W. (2007). Splendid Failure: Postwar Reconstruction in the American South. American Ways (paperback ed.). Chicago: Ivan R. Dee. ISBN 978-1-56663-739-8.
- Foner, Eric (2002) [1988]. Reconstruction: America's Unfinished Revolution. New York: HarperCollins. ISBN 0-06-093716-5.
- Foner, Eric (December 3, 2006). "He's The Worst Ever". The Washington Post.
- Goldstone, Lawrence (2011). Inherently Unequal: The Betrayal of Equal Rights by the Supreme Court, 1865–1903. Walker & Company.
- Gordon-Reed, Annette (2011). Andrew Johnson. The American Presidents Series. New York: Henry Holt and Company. ISBN 978-0-8050-6948-8.
- Graff, Henry F., ed. The Presidents: A Reference History (3rd ed. 2002) online
- Lafantasie, Glenn (February 21, 2011). "Who's the worst president of them all?". Salon.com. Archived from the original on December 31, 2011.
- Rhodes, James Ford (1904). History of the United States from the Compromise of 1850. Vol. v. New York: The Macmillan Company.
- Stewart, David O. (2009). Impeached: the Trial of President Andrew Johnson and the Fight for Lincoln's Legacy. New York: Simon and Schuster. ISBN 978-1-4165-4749-5.
- Tolson, Jay (February 16, 2007). "The 10 Worst Presidents: No. 3 Andrew Johnson (1865–1869)". U.S. News & World Report.
- Trefousse, Hans L. (1989). Andrew Johnson: A Biography. New York: W.W. Norton & Company. ISBN 0-393-31742-0.
- White, Richard (2017). The Republic for Which It Stands: The United States During Reconstruction and the Gilded Age: 1865–1896. New York: Oxford University Press. ISBN 9780190619060.
