= Reconstruction military districts =

Temporary administrative units in American South

Map of the five Reconstruction military districts First Military District Second Military District Third Military District Fourth Military District Fifth Military District

Following the end of the American Civil War, five Reconstruction Military Districts of the U.S. Army were established as temporary administrative units of the U.S. War Department in the American South. The districts were stipulated by the Reconstruction Acts during the Reconstruction period following the American Civil War.

== Creation of the military districts ==
In March 1867, Radical Republicans in Congress became frustrated with President Andrew Johnson's Reconstruction policies, which, they believed, allowed too many former Confederate officials to hold public office in the South. Politically empowered Democratic Party politicians who were former Confederates would obstruct the civil rights of newly freed African Americans. For Republicans these rights, which would allow the prewar ideology of abolition to translate to real freedom, were critical.

In response, Congressional Republicans passed a multitude of bills furthering strict Reconstruction policies known as the Reconstruction Acts, the most important of which being "An Act to provide for the more efficient Government of the Rebel States". This act, passed on March 2, 1867, divided ten of the eleven former Confederate States (except for Tennessee, after it ratified the 14th Amendment, though federal troops would remain in Tennessee to maintain order) into five separate military districts. The Reconstruction Acts required that each former Confederate state hold a Constitutional Convention, adopt a new State Constitution, and ratify the 14th Amendment before rejoining the Union. The five districts and the states within them were:

- First Military District (Virginia)
- Second Military District (North Carolina, South Carolina)
- Third Military District (Georgia, Alabama and Florida)
- Fourth Military District (Arkansas and Mississippi)
- Fifth Military District (Texas and Louisiana)

Each of these districts fell under the command of former Union Army general officers to supervise the replacement of undesirable former Confederate officials and use military force to guarantee the safety of liberated African Americans and maintain peace. However, it soon became apparent that the appointed army commanders could only act as peacekeepers until the president unveiled a proper Reconstruction policy.
