= Second Military District =

Temporary administrative unit in American South

Map of the five Reconstruction military districts First Military District Second Military District Third Military District Fourth Military District Fifth Military District

The Second Military District of the U.S. Army was one of five temporary administrative units of the U.S. War Department that existed in the American South. The district was stipulated by the Reconstruction Acts during the Reconstruction period following the American Civil War. It included the territories of North and South Carolina, and acted as the de facto military government of those states while a new civilian government was being re-established. It was headquartered in Charleston, South Carolina. Originally commanded by Major General Daniel Sickles, after his removal by President Andrew Johnson on August 26, 1867, Brigadier General Edward Canby took over command until both states were readmitted in July 1868.

Its successor was the Department of the South.

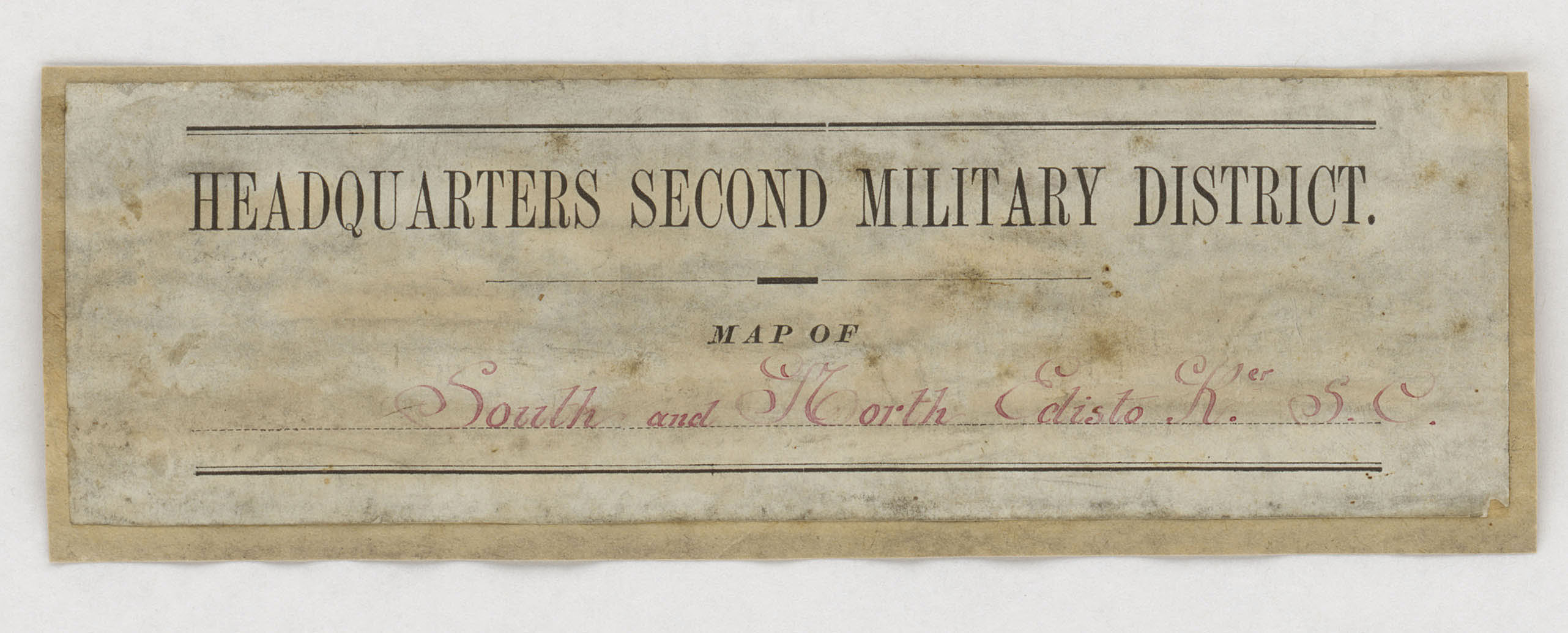
Label from a map held at 2nd Military District HQ

== See also ==
- Reconstruction military districts
  - First Military District (Virginia)
  - Third Military District (Georgia, Alabama and Florida)
  - Fourth Military District (Arkansas and Mississippi)
  - Fifth Military District (Texas and Louisiana)
