= Third Military District =

Temporary administrative unit in American South

Map of the five Reconstruction military districts First Military District Second Military District Third Military District Fourth Military District Fifth Military District

The Third Military District of the U.S. Army was one of five temporary administrative units of the U.S. War Department that existed in the American South. The district was stipulated by the Reconstruction Acts during the Reconstruction period following the American Civil War. It comprised Georgia, Florida and Alabama and was headquartered in Atlanta.

The district was originally commanded by General John Pope until his removal by President Andrew Johnson on December 28, 1867, when General George Gordon Meade took his place. Meade served at the current location of Fort McPherson until August 1868 after Alabama and Florida were re-admitted into the United States.

Because of the expulsion of Blacks from the Georgia legislature, a new and final military commander was appointed on December 22, 1869, General Alfred Terry. In January, he returned the legislators and ousted 29 Democrats. In February, the Fourteenth amendment was ratified by Georgia and by July it was re-admitted into the Union.

== See also ==
- Reconstruction
  - First Military District (Virginia)
  - Second Military District (North Carolina, South Carolina)
  - Fourth Military District (Arkansas and Mississippi)
  - Fifth Military District (Texas and Louisiana)
