= Fifth Military District =

Temporary administrative unit in American South

Map of the five Reconstruction military districts First Military District Second Military District Third Military District Fourth Military District Fifth Military District

The Fifth Military District of the U.S. Army was one of five temporary administrative units of the U.S. War Department that existed in the American South from 1867 to 1870. The district was stipulated by the Reconstruction Acts during the Reconstruction period following the American Civil War. It covered the states of Texas and Louisiana.

General Philip Sheridan served as its first military governor, enforcing the Reconstruction Acts and removing some Confederate sympathizers from office. This outraged U.S. President Andrew Johnson, who ordered his removal from the Fifth in August 1867. His replacement was the Democrat Winfield Scott Hancock, who undid much of Sheridan's work.

In the three months between Sheridan's removal and Hancock's arrival in New Orleans, the Fifth was led by two interim commanders: Charles Griffin until his death from yellow fever, then Joseph A. Mower.

When Ulysses S. Grant took office in March 1869, he replaced Hancock with Joseph J. Reynolds, who commanded the Fifth until Texas was readmitted to the Union on March 30, 1870, and military control ended.

Several incidents were committed against black federal soldiers at Fort Brown in Brownsville, Texas, and elsewhere by Jayhawkers, Natives, desperados, etc. Most incident reports fail to identify the perpetrators.

== Units ==
Among the United States Army forces stationed in Texas were the U.S. 1st Artillery, the 4th, 6th and 9th Cavalry Regiments, and the 15th, 17th, 20th, 25th and 41st Infantry Regiments.

The "U.S. Military Post Returns 1809-1916", archived by NARA, shows monthly post reports were filed for the U.S. 35th Infantry Regiment stationed in San Antonio, TX from about Dec. 1866 to mid-1870. It was commanded most of the time by Brigadier General (Brevet) John S. Mason.

== See also ==
- Reconstruction military districts
  - First Military District (Virginia)
  - Second Military District (North Carolina, South Carolina)
  - Third Military District (Georgia, Alabama and Florida)
  - Fourth Military District (Arkansas and Mississippi)
