= Fourth Military District =

Temporary administrative unit in American South

Map of the five Reconstruction military districts First Military District Second Military District Third Military District Fourth Military District Fifth Military District

The Fourth Military District of the U.S. Army was one of five temporary administrative units of the U.S. War Department that existed in the American South. The district was stipulated by the Reconstruction Acts during the Reconstruction period following the American Civil War. It included the occupation troops in the states of Arkansas and Mississippi. At various times, the district was commanded by generals Edward Ord, Alvan Cullem Gillem, and Adelbert Ames.

Following the completion of the Civil War, the Federal government under President of the United States Andrew Johnson sought to restore order within the states that had composed the defeated Confederate States of America. Johnson, a loyal Tennessean, advocated a lenient strategy to remove all commercial and social restrictions between the states, with the intention for the South to return to its former position in the Union. He believed that former Confederates should receive amnesty for their actions during the war and regain full rights of citizenship. However, the Radical Republicans in Congress vehemently disagreed, and passed the 1867 Reconstruction Acts, which divided the former Confederacy into military districts, in which a military commander controlled all social, economic, and political activity in the region. The Fourth Military District comprised the states of Mississippi and Arkansas, with its headquarters in Vicksburg.

Edward Ord served as the district's first commander, with Alvan C. Gillem, like Johnson a loyal Tennessean, in charge of the sub-district of Mississippi. Gillem was later appointed as the district's commander. He favored the policy of leniency towards the former Confederates, invoking the displeasure of the Radicals in Congress. When Ulysses S. Grant became president, he removed Gillem from command and reassigned him to Texas, replacing him again with Ord, a personal friend who had served under Grant during the Civil War. When Ord was later assigned command of the District of California, another former Civil War general, Adelbert Ames, assumed command in 1868, and was also named as Governor of Mississippi, replacing former Confederate general Benjamin G. Humphreys.

When Mississippi was readmitted to the Union in 1870, the Fourth Military District was abolished and control of the state reverted to the newly elected state government.

== See also ==
- Reconstruction military districts
  - First Military District (Virginia)
  - Second Military District (North Carolina, South Carolina)
  - Third Military District (Georgia, Alabama and Florida)
  - Fifth Military District (Texas and Louisiana)
