= Reconstruction Acts =

US laws on ex-Confederate states' readmission to the Union (1867–68)

First Reconstruction Act
- Other short titles: First Military Reconstruction Act
- Long title: An Act to provide for the more efficient Government of the Rebel States
- Enacted by: the 39th United States Congress

Citations
- Public law: Pub. L. 39–153
- Statutes at Large: 14 Stat. 428

Legislative history
- Introduced in the House by John Bingham (R‑OH) on February 26, 1865; Committee consideration by Joint Select Committee on Reconstruction; Passed the House on February 13, 1867 (109–55); Passed the Senate on February 16, 1867 (29–10); Vetoed by President Andrew Johnson on March 2, 1867; Overridden by the Senate on March 2, 1867 (38–10); Overridden by the House and became law on March 2, 1867 (135–48)

Major amendments
- Pub. L. 40–6, 15 Stat. 2 (March 23, 1867); Pub. L. 40–30, 15 Stat. 14 (July 19, 1867); Pub. L. 40–25; 15 Stat. 41 (March 11, 1868)

The Reconstruction Acts, or the Military Reconstruction Acts, sometimes referred to collectively as the Reconstruction Act of 1867, were four landmark Acts of Congress enacted by the 39th and 40th United States Congresses over the vetoes of President Andrew Johnson from March 2, 1867 to March 11, 1868, establishing martial law in the Southern United States and the requirements for the readmission of those states which had declared secession at the start of the American Civil War. The requirements of the Reconstruction Acts were considerably more stringent than the requirements imposed by Presidents Abraham Lincoln and Andrew Johnson between 1863 and 1867 and marked the end of that period of "presidential" reconstruction and the beginning of "congressional" or "radical" reconstruction.

The Acts did not apply to Tennessee, which had already ratified the 14th Amendment and had been readmitted to the Union on July 24, 1866. However, federal troops would remain in Tennessee to protect federal property, enforce laws, and keep the peace.

== Background ==
Throughout the American Civil War, the Union army confronted the challenges of administering captured territory and establishing loyal civilian governments. Within the Union government and officer corps, there was disagreement over the legal nature and consequences of secession, the conditions for recognition of civilian governments, and the desirability or necessity of social reform in the South. In practice, President Abraham Lincoln and the Army implemented reconstruction policies which were deemed most conducive to military aims. Lincoln instituted a lenient "ten percent plan" in December 1863 and vetoed the more radical Wade–Davis Bill. For a time, Congress had seated members from the reconstructed governments of Virginia, Louisiana, and Tennessee, but this practice ended abruptly upon the start of the 38th Congress in December 1863.

After the conclusion of hostilities and assassination of Abraham Lincoln in April 1865, Vice President Andrew Johnson succeeded Lincoln as president. Johnson prioritized reconciliation and reunion with the defeated Confederate States of America, provided that the new reconstructed governments repudiated secession, slavery, and debts incurred by the Confederate government. He pardoned a number of Confederate civilian and military leaders and did not press for social reform in the South, permitting civilian governments to restrict the rights of free people of color ("freedmen") in the form of discriminatory "Black Codes". By the start of the 39th Congress in December 1865, reconstructed governments were functioning in eight of the eleven former Confederate states, seven of which had ratified the Thirteenth Amendment to the United States Constitution and several of which had sent representatives to Congress. However, the Clerk of the House refused to seat these representatives-elect, and Congress approved their exclusion after a complex debate on the legality of and remedy for secession. The 39th Congress passed several bills seeking to establish civil rights for freedmen, which Johnson vetoed. Hostilities between Johnson and the Congress, as well as more radical members of the administration he had inherited from Lincoln, grew through the course of 1866.

In the 1866 midterm elections, Johnson publicly campaigned for his reconstruction policies; the speaking tour backfired badly, and radicals in Congress greatly expanded their majority. Even before the start of the 40th Congress, Republicans sought to supplant Johnson's authority over reconstruction, and radicals in the new Congress soon sought his impeachment and removal from office.

In parallel to the political conflict between Johnson and Congress and in response to objections to the constitutionality of the Civil Rights Act of 1866, Congress proposed the Fourteenth Amendment to the United States Constitution for ratification.

== History ==
=== Reconstruction Act ===
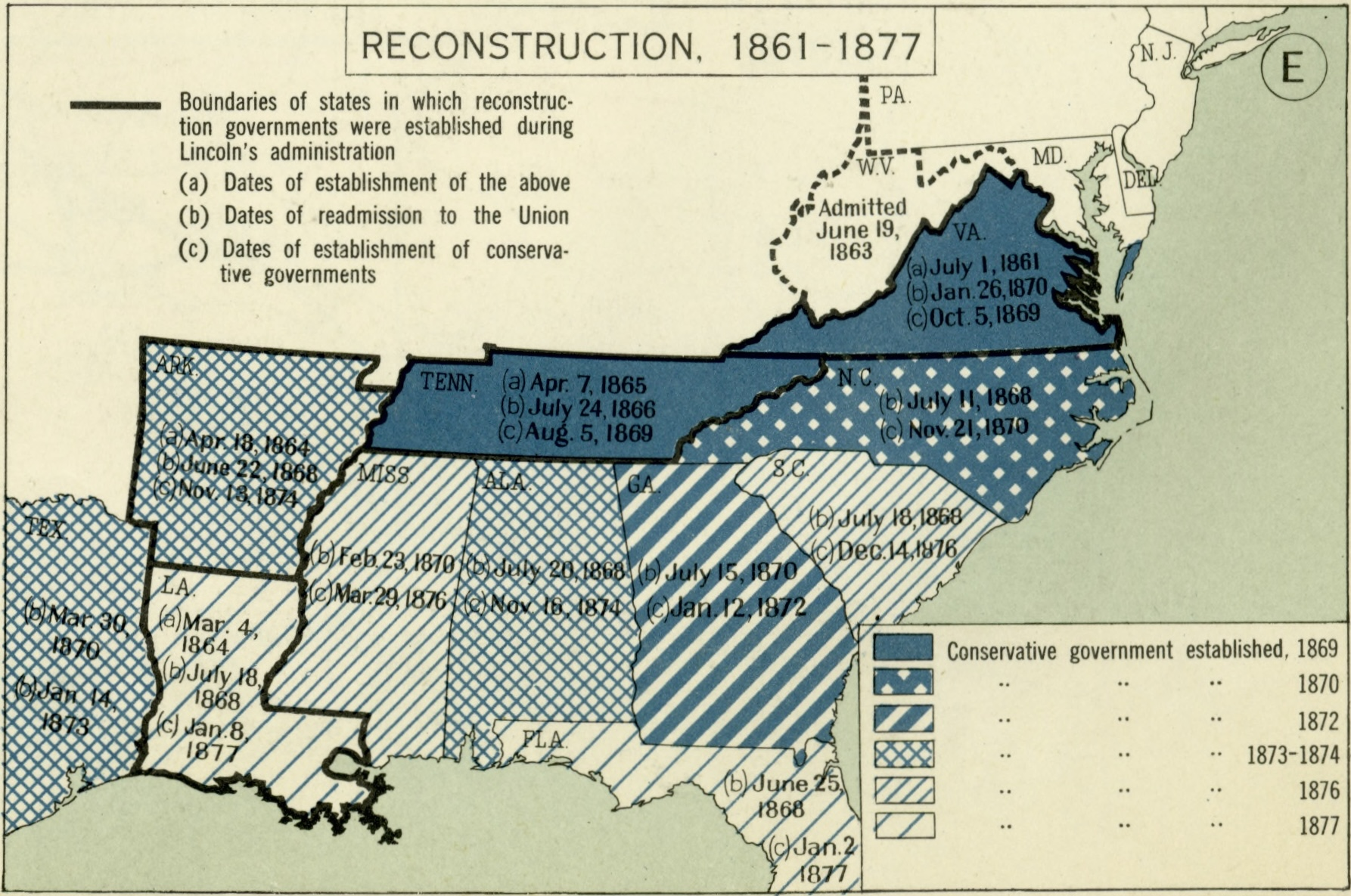
Map of Reconstruction in the United States, 1861–1877.

The Reconstruction Act began as a bill introduced by Representative John Bingham of Ohio on February 26, 1865, on behalf of the Joint Select Committee on Reconstruction as part of the same package as the initial proposal for the Fourteenth Amendment. It would have restored states that ratified the new amendment to representation in Congress upon its adoption. Until that time, the reconstructed governments established under Lincoln and Johnson would continue to function subject to military oversight and without congressional approval. However, when Congress met in December 1866, only the civilian government of Tennessee had ratified the proposed amendment, (Note: Tennessee was accordingly readmitted to the Union by a congressional resolution of July 1866 which cited its ratification of the Fourteenth Amendment and "other acts proclaiming and denoting loyalty". Johnson objected to the terms of the preamble, which stated that Tennessee could "only be restored to its former political relations in the Union by the consent of the lawmaking power of the United States", and he protested that the congressional resolution was not necessary but signed the resolution regardless on July 24, 1866.) and every other Southern state had rejected it.

The Rebel States under military rule were grouped into five military districts or occupation departments:

1. Virginia
2. North and South Carolina
3. Georgia, Alabama, and Florida
4. Mississippi and Arkansas
5. Texas and Louisiana

Tennessee did not have an occupation government, because it had ratified the 14th Amendment. Instead, federal troops would remain stationed in the state to maintain order rather than military rule.

On January 3, 1867, Representatives Thaddeus Stevens and James Mitchell Ashley introduced a pair of substitutes for the Bingham bill which provided procedures for the creation of new state governments in the seceded states. Both proposals required universal manhood suffrage, disfranchisement and disqualification of certain former Confederate officials, and a guarantee of equal civil rights as conditions for readmission. Stevens and Ashley agreed that the existing reconstruction governments were illegitimate and ought to be replaced. The Bingham, Stevens, and Ashley proposals were all referred back to the Joint Committee on Reconstruction on January 28 for further study. The bill was reintroduced on behalf of the Joint Committee by Senator George Henry Williams of Oregon on February 6. Rather than establish requirements for readmission of civilian governments, the committee draft made the states "subject to the military authority of the United States" in order to "protect all persons in their rights of person and property, to suppress insurrection, disorder, and violence, and to punish ... all disturbers of the public peace and criminals." The bill was attacked on the grounds that it violated the guarantee clause of the United States Constitution and sought to try civilians in military courts. Supporters cited the principle of vae victis and the Constitution's necessary and proper clause, arguing that martial law would be a temporary means to preserve order until republican governments could be established. Amendments proposed by Representatives Bingham and James G. Blaine of Maine which sought to ensure that military control was terminated upon adoption of a republican constitution, universal manhood suffrage, and adoption of the Fourteenth Amendment failed badly, and the bill passed the House as a purely military measure for the preservation of order.

In the Senate, the bill passed with the Blaine amendment establishing the conditions for the end of military rule and readmission (as proposed by Senator John Sherman of Ohio). It was returned to the House, where the amendment was objected to. It eventually passed the House with two further amendments, one disfranchising those rebels who would be excluded from office under the insurrection clause of the Fourteenth Amendment and another declaring existing reconstructed state governments "provisional" and subject to military authority. President Johnson vetoed the bill, arguing that its premises were false and it was unconstitutional, but both houses of Congress overrode his veto to make the Reconstruction Act law on March 2, 1867.

=== Supplementary laws ===
The Reconstruction Act was supplemented on March 23, only three weeks after its passage, in order to provide a machinery for establishing the new state governments required for readmission. This supplementary act provided for registration of qualified voters, election of delegates to a constitutional convention (if the people voted to hold one), and submission of the resulting constitution for public approval, all under military supervision and enforcement. Upon enactment of such a constitution, Congress would determine whether it reflected the people's will and conformed to the first Reconstruction Act. Johnson vetoed the supplementary bill along similar lines, and opponents raised similar objections; his veto was quickly overridden. (Note: Representative Fernando Wood of New York added that military oversight of proposed elections was inconsistent with the guarantee of republican government.)

Following passage of the two Reconstruction Acts, United States Attorney General Henry Stanbery, a Johnson appointee and leading proponent of presidential reconstruction, adopted a narrow interpretation of the Acts, especially with regard to military authority. Stanbery also interpreted the disfranchisement provision to require only an oath of loyalty to the United States Constitution. Congress responded with a second supplemental statute in July 1867 which empowered military commanders to suspend or remove any state officer (including municipal officers) and to provide for the performance of his duties either "by the detail of some competent officer or soldier of the army, or by the appointment of some other person, and to fill vacancies occasioned by death, resignation, or otherwise," subject to review by the General of the Army, who was then Ulysses S. Grant. The second supplemental Act also explicitly authorized state boards of voter registration, which were established by the military, to determine for themselves whether any voter was eligible under the disfranchisement provision; in practice, this severely restricted the pool of voters eligible to participate in the establishment of new governments. In a direct blow at Stanbery, the second supplemental Act provided that "[n]o district commander or member of the board of registration, or any of the officers or appointees acting under them, shall be bound in his action by any opinion of any civil officer of the United States," effectively exempting the military from civilian oversight other than by the President as commander-in-chief. Johnson again vetoed the bill on grounds of unconstitutionality, citing the same justifications as for his vetoes of the two earlier bills, as well as the vesting clause of Article Two of the United States Constitution, which provides that Congress may "by law vest the appointment of such inferior officers as they think proper in the President alone, in the courts of law, or in the heads of Departments".

In Mississippi, where the State's proposed Constitution was overwhelmingly hated by the public, the opponents of the new Constitution refused to vote, making it impossible for a majority of registered voters to approve of the State Constitution. In response, Congress passed another Reconstruction Act, requiring only a majority of actual voters to approve a new constitution.

== Constitutionality ==
Questions of constitutionality dominated the debate over the Reconstruction Acts. On February 17, 1868, the Supreme Court of the United States upheld its appellate jurisdiction over circuit court review of a petition for a writ of habeas corpus to a military district commander in the South, whose authority came from the Reconstruction Acts, in the case Ex parte McCardle. On March 12, Representative James F. Wilson of Iowa introduced an amendment to revoke such jurisdiction by repealing provisions of the Habeas Corpus Act of 1867. The amendment passed with little objection, denying the Supreme Court jurisdiction to review the McCardle case, in which the constitutionality of congressional reconstruction was at stake. Wilson later admitted that he had intended to prevent the Court from reaching a decision in McCardle, following rumors that it would invalidate Reconstruction entirely. Johnson vetoed this bill as well, arguing Wilson's amendment was "not in harmony with the spirit and intention of the Constitution"; this veto was overridden by wide margins in both houses.

Legal scholars continue to debate the constitutionality of the Reconstruction Acts. In 2008, University of Chicago Law School professor David P. Currie argued the primary Act was unconstitutional because the former Confederate states had already established republican governments under presidential reconstruction, and Congress could not condition readmission to its chambers on the eradication of racial discrimination in voting.

== See also ==
- Reconstruction Amendments
- First Military District (Virginia)
- Second Military District (North Carolina, South Carolina)
- Third Military District (Georgia, Alabama and Florida)
- Fourth Military District (Arkansas and Mississippi)
- Fifth Military District (Texas and Louisiana)
