= District of Oregon (military) =

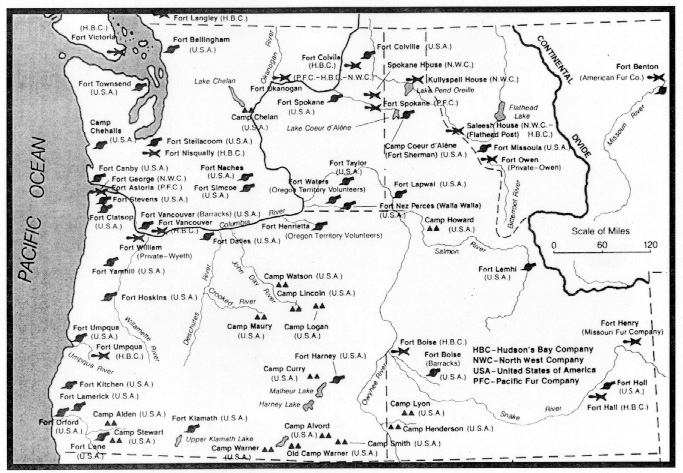
Civil War era military outposts in the Pacific Northwest

The District of Oregon was a Union Army command department formed during the American Civil War.

== History ==
The District of Oregon was part of the independent Department of the Pacific reconstituted by consolidating the Departments of California and Oregon, which was created on January 15, 1861, when the Army was reorganized. The district was created the same day, and comprised the same territory as the former Department of Oregon, the state of Oregon (except for the areas of the Rogue River and Umpqua River in Southern Oregon) and Washington Territory, with headquarters at Fort Vancouver in Washington Territory.

On March 3, 1865, the district included Idaho Territory after it was formed from the eastern part of Washington Territory. On March 14, 1865, the District of Oregon was extended to include the entire state of Oregon.

On July 27, 1865, the Military Division of the Pacific was created under Major General Henry W. Halleck, replacing the Department of the Pacific. It consisted of the Department of the Columbia replacing the District of Oregon and the Department of California. George Wright, now a U. S. Army Brigadier General, was assigned to command the new Department of the Columbia.

== District of Oregon commanders ==
- Colonel George Wright, January 15, 1861 – September 13, 1861.
- Colonel Benjamin L. Beall, September 13, 1861 – October 23, 1861.
- Lieutenant Colonel Albemarle Cady, October 23, 1861 – May 5, 1862
- Colonel Justus Steinberger May 5, 1862 – July 7, 1862
- Brigadier General Benjamin Alvord, July 7, 1862 – March 23, 1865
- Colonel Reuben F. Maury, March 23, 1865 – June 27, 1865

== Posts in the District of Oregon ==
- Fort Colville, Washington Territory, 1859–1882
- Fort Steilacoom, Washington Territory, (1849–1868)
- Fort Dalles, Oregon, 1850–1867
- Fort Vancouver, Washington Territory 1853–1879
- Fort Bellingham, Washington Territory (1855–1860)
- Fort Cascades, Washington Territory (1855–1861)
- Fort Yamhill, Oregon (1856–1866)
- Fort Townsend, Washington Territory (1856–1861)
- Fort Walla Walla, Washington Territory 1856–1911
- Fort Hoskins, Oregon, 1857–1865
- Siletz Blockhouse, Oregon 1858–1866
- Camp Pickett, Washington Territory (1859–1863)
  - Post of San Juan, Washington Territory (1863–1867)
- Camp Chehalis, Washington Territory (1860–1861)
- Camp Baker, Oregon 1862–1865,
- Camp Barlow, Oregon, 1862
  - Camp Clackamas, Oregon, 1862
- Post at Cape Disappointment, Washington Territory, 1862–1864
  - Fort Cape Disappointment, Washington Territory, 1864–1875
- Camp Lapwai, Idaho Territory, 1862
  - Fort Lapwai, Idaho Territory, 1862–1884
- Fort Boise, Idaho Territory, 1863–1912
- Post at Grand Ronde Indian Agency or Fort Lafayette, Oregon 1863,
- Fort Hall, Idaho Territory, 1863–1865
- Fort Klamath, Oregon, 1863–1890
- Fort at Point Adams, Oregon 1863–?
- Camp Alvord, Oregon 1864–1866
- Camp Dalgren, Oregon 1864
- Camp Henderson, Oregon, 1864–1866
- Camp Lincoln, Oregon 1864
- Camp Maury, Oregon 1864
- Camp Russell, Oregon 1864–1865
- Camp Watson, Oregon 1864–1869
- Camp Colfax, Oregon, 1865, 1867
- Camp Currey, Oregon 1865–1866
- Camp Lander, Idaho Territory, 1865–1866
- Camp Logan, Oregon 1865–1868
- Camp Lyon, Idaho 1865–1869
- Camp Polk, Oregon 1865–1866
- Camp Reed, Idaho Territory 1865–1866
- Camp on Silvies River, Oregon ?
- Camp Wright, Oregon 1865–1866
- Old Camp Warner, Oregon 1866–1867
- Camp Warner, Oregon 1867–1874

== See also ==
- Idaho in the American Civil War
- Montana in the American Civil War
- Oregon in the American Civil War
- Washington in the American Civil War
- Snake War
