= Department of the Columbia =

Defunct American military command

The Department of the Columbia was a major command (Department) of the United States Army during the 19th century.

== Formation ==
On July 27, 1865 the Military Division of the Pacific was created under Major General Henry W. Halleck, replacing the Department of the Pacific, consisting of the Department of the Columbia (replacing the District of Oregon) that now consisted of the state of Oregon and the territories of Washington and Idaho and the expanded Department of California.

Within the Department was the District of Boise, 1865-67 and District of Owyhee, 1867-69 that were engaged in the Snake War.

The Military District of Alaska, subordinate to the Department of the Columbia, was formed in 1867 following the purchase of Alaska. On March 18, 1868, the Army established the Department of Alaska under the Division of the Pacific. The Department of Alaska was discontinued on July 1, 1870, and Alaska was absorbed again by the Department of the Columbia.

In June 1875, the part of the Territory of Idaho that lay east of the extension of the western boundary of Utah, and including Fort Hall, was detached from the Department of Columbia and added to the Department of the Platte.

When the Military Division of the Pacific was discontinued on July 3, 1891. Each of its three subordinate departments including the Department of the Columbia, then reported directly to the War Department.

== Commanders of the Military Department of Columbia ==
- Brigadier General George Wright, July 27, 1865 – July 30, 1865
- Colonel George Byron Currey, July 27, 1865 – November 20, 1865
- Lieutenant Colonel John M. Drake, November 20, 1865 – December 22, 1865
- Major General Frederick Steele, December 21, 1865 – November 23, 1867
- Lieutenant Colonel George Crook, November 23, 1867 – August 8, 1870
- Brigadier General Edward Richard Sprigg Canby, August 8, 1870 – January 1873
- Colonel Jefferson Columbus Davis, January 1873 – September 1874
- Brigadier General Oliver Otis Howard, September 1874 – January 1881
- Brigadier General Nelson A. Miles, January 1881 – July 1885
- Brigadier General John Gibbon, July 1885 – April 1891
- Brigadier General August Kautz, April 1891 – January 1892

== Posts in the Military Department of Columbia ==
- Fort Colville, Washington Territory, 1859–1882
- Fort Steilacoom, Washington Territory, 1849–1868
- Fort Dalles, Oregon, 1850–1867
- Fort Vancouver, Washington Territory, 1853–1879
- Fort Yamhill, Oregon, 1856–1866
- Fort Walla Walla, Washington Territory, 1856–1911
- Siletz Blockhouse, Oregon, 1858–1866
- Post of San Juan, Washington Territory, 1863–1867
- Fort Cape Disappointment, Washington Territory, 1864–1875
  - Fort Canby, 1875–
- Fort Lapwai, Idaho Territory, 1862–1884
- Fort Boise, Idaho Territory, 1863–1912
- Fort Klamath, Oregon, 1863–1890
- Fort at Point Adams, Oregon, 1863–1865
  - Fort Stevens, Oregon, 1865 - 1947
- Camp Alvord, Oregon, 1864–1866
- Camp Henderson, Oregon, 1864–1866
- Camp Watson, Oregon, 1864–1869
- Camp Colfax, Oregon, 1865, 1867
- Camp Currey, Oregon, 1865–1866
- Camp Lander, Idaho Territory, 1865–1866
- Camp Logan, Oregon, 1865–1868
- Camp Lyon, Idaho, 1865–1869
- Camp Polk, Oregon, 1865–1866
- Camp Reed, Idaho Territory, 1865–1866
- Camp on Silvies River, Oregon ?
- Camp Wright, Oregon 1865–1866
- Old Camp Warner, Oregon, 1866–1867
- Camp Warner, Oregon, 1867–1874
