= Department of Oregon =

Former United States Army Department

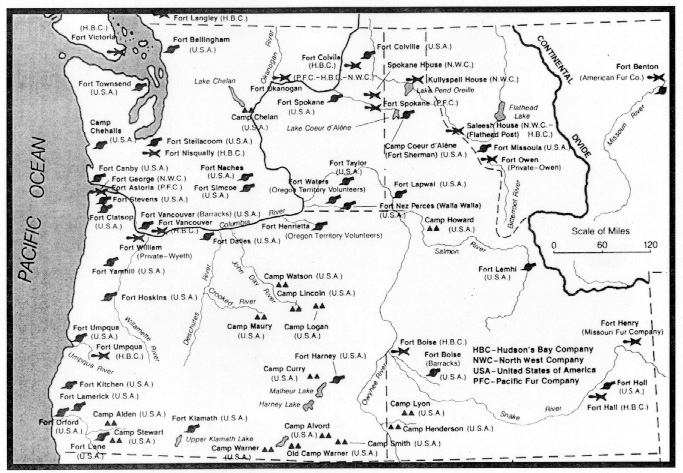
Military outposts in the Pacific Northwest

The Department of Oregon was one of two Army Departments created September 13, 1858, replacing the original Department of the Pacific and was composed of the Territories of Washington and Oregon, except the Rogue River and Umpqua Districts, which were assigned to the Department of California. Its creation was authorized by General Orders, No. 10, of the United States Department of War, Adjutant-General's Office, September 13, 1858. Its headquarters was at Fort Vancouver, in the Washington Territory.

== Commanders ==
Its first commander was Brevet Brigadier General William S. Harney, U.S. Army, from 1858 to June 1860. Shortly after he took command he sent troops under Captain George E. Pickett to San Juan Island precipitating the Pig War with Great Britain. Due to these altercations with the British he was recalled in June 1860 by the United States Secretary of War who reassigned Harney to the Department of the West, replacing him with the victor of the Oregon Indian Wars, Colonel George Wright, of the U.S. 9th Infantry Regiment, from June 8, 1860.

The Department of Oregon was merged into the restored Department of the Pacific on January 15, 1861, as the District of Oregon administering the same territories, under Col. Wright.

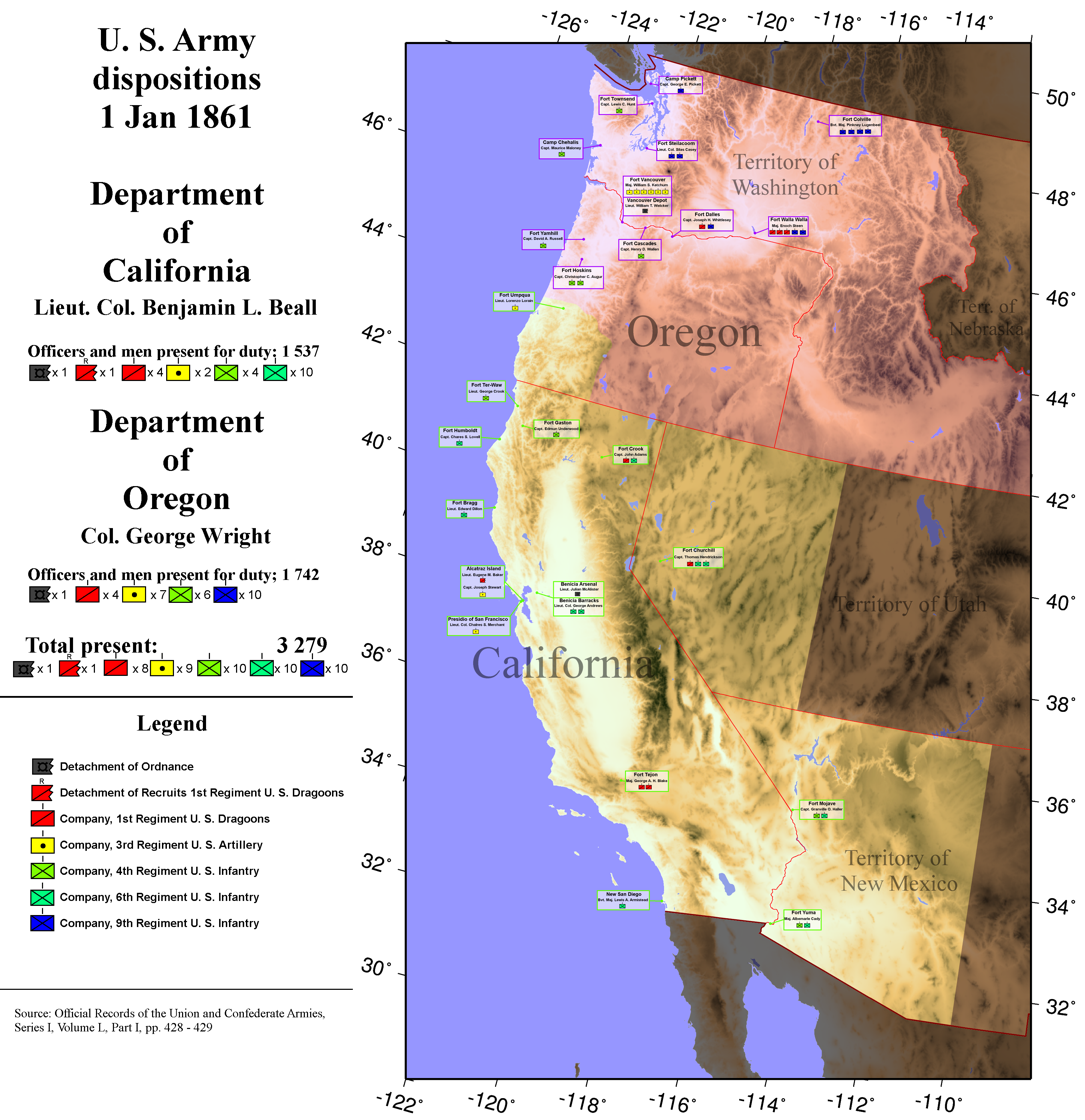
Garrisons of the Departments of California and Oregon 1 January 1861

== Posts in the Department of Oregon ==
=== Washington ===
- Fort Colville, Washington Territory 1825 - 1870
- Fort Steilacoom, Washington Territory 1849 - 1868
- Fort Vancouver, Washington Territory 1849-1879
- Fort Bellingham, Washington Territory 1855 - 1860
- Fort Cascades, Washington Territory 1855 - 1861
- Fort Townsend, Washington Territory 1856 - 1861
- Fort Walla Walla, Washington Territory 1856 - 1911
- Camp Chehalis, Washington Territory 1860 - 1861
- Camp Pickett, Washington Territory 1859-1863

=== Idaho ===
- Major Howe's Camp, Washington Territory (Idaho) 1860
- Fort Hall, Washington Territory (Idaho) 1859 - 1860

=== Oregon ===
- Fort Dalles, Oregon 1850-1867
- Fort Yamhill, Oregon 1856 - 1866
- Fort Hoskins, Oregon 1857 - 1865
- Siletz Blockhouse, Oregon 1858 - 1866
- Camp Randolph 1859
- Camp Owyhee, Oregon 1860
- Camp Union, Oregon 1860
- Camp Day, Oregon 1860

== See also ==
- Department of California
