= Washington Territory in the American Civil War =

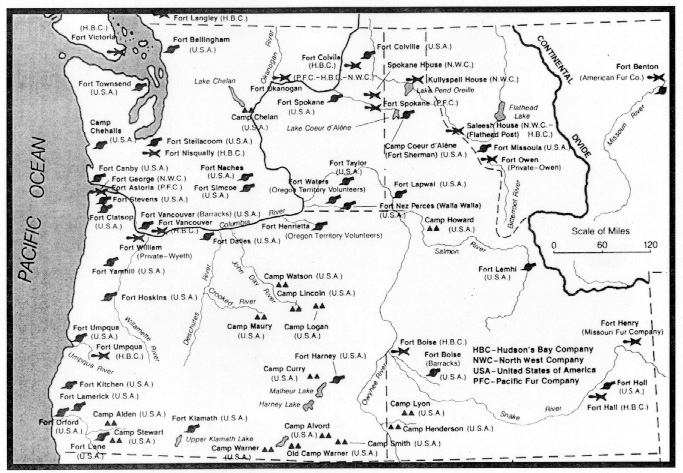
Civil War era military outposts in the Pacific Northwest

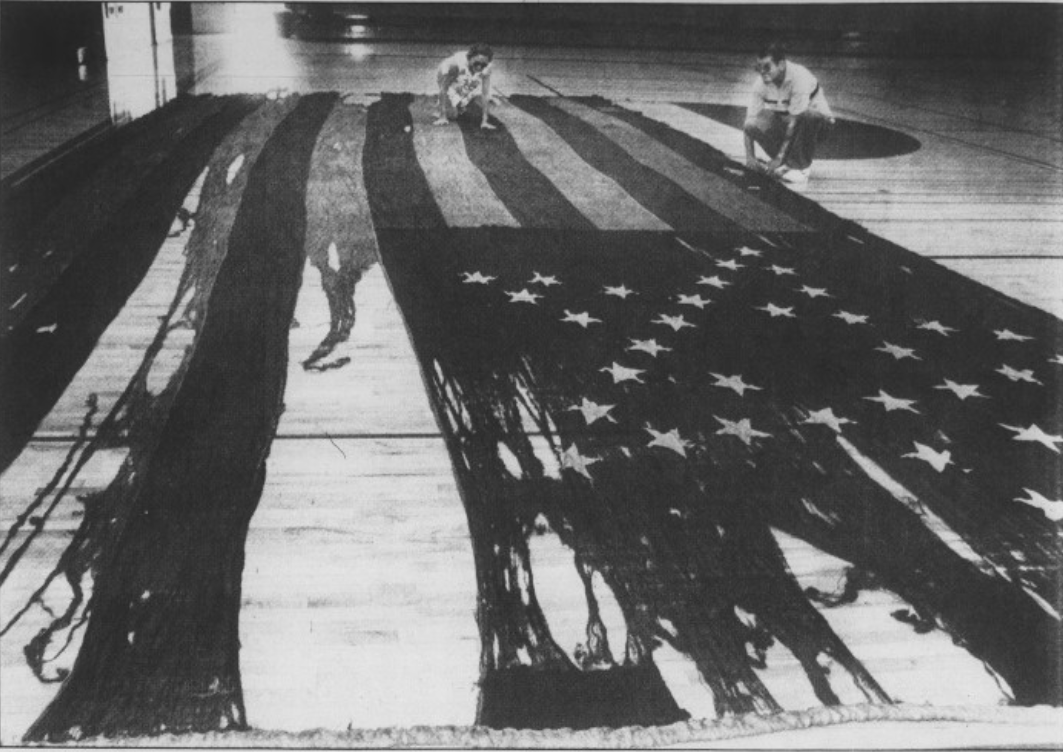
The Claquato flag, it was made in 1862 and was the largest flag flown in the Territory during the war. The whole thing measures 18-feet wide and 36-feet long

The role of Washington Territory in the American Civil War is atypical, as the territory was the most remote from the main battlefields of the conflict. The territory raised a small number of volunteers for the Union Army, who did not fight against the Confederate States Army but instead maintained defensive positions against possible foreign naval or land attacks. Although the Indian Wars in Washington were recent, there were no Indian hostilities within the area of modern Washington, unlike the rest of the western states and territories, during the Civil War. At the start of the American Civil War, modern-day Washington was part of the Washington Territory. On March 3, 1863, the Idaho Territory was formed from that territory, consisting of the entirety of modern-day Idaho, Montana, and all but southwest Wyoming, leaving the modern-day Washington as Washington Territory.

== Washington Territory before the Civil War ==
Washington Territory before the Civil War was the most remote place in the United States from the theater of conflict. Additionally, Washington Territory only had peace with the local Indians for three years when the Civil War began and the few settlers there were just recovering from the fear and economic strain those wars had caused them. Also, of great concern locally was the recent Pig War and continuing territorial dispute over San Juan Island that affected relations with Great Britain during the American Civil War. Politically the territory was also a stronghold for the pre-1948 Democratic Party, with many sympathetic to the Southern cause or at least tolerant of it.

== Washington Territory in the Civil War ==
=== Washington Territory Volunteer Infantry ===
With the regular U.S. Army troops recalled from the District of Oregon to fight the Civil War in the east, soldiers were still needed to man the forts and outposts in Washington Territory. The acting governor of the territory, Henry M. McGill, issued a proclamation on May 10, 1861, in response to President Lincoln's first call for volunteers, but it met with little reply. Not until October 12, was an effective step taken to raise volunteers in the territory when Colonel Thomas A. Scott, assistant secretary of war, wrote to Justus Steinberger, notifying him that he was authorized to organize a regiment of infantry, "in that territory, and the country adjacent thereto," and he was appointed colonel of said regiment. When Colonel Steinberger arrived on the coast, he came to Puget Sound in January 1862, and after he consulted with the legislature, and visited towns and settlements west of the mountains, he realized he could not hope to raise more than three companies, at most, in the territory.

Leaving R. V. Peabody to raise a company in the Sound country, and two other officers to raise two companies east of the mountains, Colonel Steinberger returned to San Francisco. There he opened a recruiting office on March 1, 1862, and two months later had secured four companies (A, B, C and D), and had two more started, soon to be at full strength. Early in May, with the four companies then completed and mustered, he left San Francisco for Fort Vancouver, soon followed by the two other companies from California. Later two more were raised in California, making eight in all from California, in the regiment which was not withstanding known as the 1st Washington Territory Infantry Regiment. In the end only two companies of the Regiment were raised in Washington Territory, and one of these (Company F) was recruited largely from residents of Oregon. Company K, which was mustered in at Fort Steilacoom was the only Company raised only from men from Washington Territory. East of the Cascades troops could not be raised from the men involved in the frenzy of the Idaho gold rush then beginning.

The Volunteer soldiers who served in Washington did not fight against the Confederacy, but instead garrisoned the few posts in Washington that were not abandoned at the beginning of the war. They also protected communications routes between the western and eastern United States in Oregon and Idaho from the Indians and against the threat of foreign intervention on the Pacific coast by Britain and France that never materialized. Three companies in the newly formed Idaho Territory were engaged in an expedition to clear the area of the Snake Indians who threatened settlers to the territory in 1863 and 1864.

==== Washington Territorial Units in the Civil War ====
- 1st Regiment Washington Territory Volunteer Infantry
  - Company F
  - Company H
  - Company K

== Threat of foreign invasion and privateers ==
=== Naval defenses ===
To protect the northern approaches to the mouth of the Columbia River from possible attacks by Confederate commerce raider or the fleets of the British Empire or French Empire in 1862, a camp called Post at Cape Disappointment was established where fortifications were built and artillery emplaced to cover the river. It was first garrisoned by Company A, U.S. 9th Infantry Regiment and later by Company A, 8th Regiment California Volunteer Infantry. In 1863, a mate to Cape Disappointment, Fort at Point Adams, later Fort Stevens was established in Oregon on the south bank of the Columbia River. In 1864, Post at Cape Disappointment was renamed Fort Cape Disappointment. Despite the fears of the Union, these forts saw no action against any enemy in the Civil War.

=== Britain's proposal to seize the Washington Territory ===
On December 28, 1861, during the ongoing Trent Affair, Governor of the Colony of British Columbia James Douglas wrote to Secretary of State for the Colonies Henry Pelham-Clinton, 5th Duke of Newcastle, arguing that Britain should seize the Washington Territory while the U.S. was preoccupied with the Civil War. He reasoned because there were little to no U.S. troops stationed in the region since most other units stationed there were off to war in the East, the territory's population was scattered, and there were a few U.S. naval ships in the area. He also said the Royal Navy and Marines were powerful and could easily do the job, ending with a statement that "with Puget Sound, and the line of the Columbia River in our hands, we should hold the only navigable outlets of the country—command its trade, and soon compel it to submit to Her Majesty’s Rule." British officials instead chose to pass on his proposal so as not to risk war with the United States.

=== Threat of privateers from Victoria, Vancouver Island ===
On March 15, 1863, a schooner, called J. M. Chapman, had been seized in the harbor of San Francisco, just as she was preparing to put to sea as a Confederate privateer. This seizure made Union men everywhere along the coast more alert for other attempts to get a vessel for the purpose. Among its papers was one letter disclosing plans for the capture of USS Shubrick but the scheme appeared to have been abandoned.

However early in 1863, Allen Francis, United States consul at Victoria, Vancouver Island, received information that led him to believe a plot was forming, to seize Shubrick, and convert her into a Confederate privateer. In the ensuing Shubrick Incident, Shubrick's Captain Pease and most of the crew, all suspected Southern sympathizers, were discharged by the Customs Collector for Puget Sound. This was accomplished on the next visit of Shubrick to Victoria, while the captain and a large part of the crew were on shore, Lieutenant Selden, second in command aboard Shubrick, threw off her mooring lines, and with only six men on board, he sailed away for Port Townsend.

On May 13, 1863, Consul Francis, writing about the Shubrick incident to Captain Hopkins of the United States Navy steamer USS Saginaw, said:

There is still in this city a rebel organization, which has had several meetings within the last few weeks. They are awaiting, it seems from rumors, the receipt of letters of marque from the president of the so-called Confederate States. At this moment an English steamer, called the Fusi Yama, is expected in this port from England, and it is rumored that she is to be purchased for a privateer."

USS Saginaw cruised the Puget Sound and Straits of San Juan de Fuca and found no privateer.

Consul Francis raised the alarm once again in October 1863, when the president of this same "Southern Association" had contacted Confederate Secretary of State Judah P. Benjamin to obtain letters of marque for a ship yet to be obtained. When Francis discovered two British ships entering the port, one with a cargo of shot and shell and the other with iron construction, he feared they would be used by the Confederacy and alerted the Navy, which sent USS Narragansett to patrol the waters near Victoria. The "Southern Association" failed to carry out their intentions to outfit a privateer.

== Civil War Posts Washington Territory, (now Washington) (after March 3, 1863) ==
- Fort Colville, Washington Territory, 1859–1882
- Fort Steilacoom, Washington Territory, (1849–1868)
- Fort Vancouver, Washington Territory 1853-1879
- Fort Cascades, Washington Territory (1855–1861)
- Fort Townsend, Washington Territory (1856–1861)
- Fort Walla Walla, Washington Territory, (1856–1911)
- Camp Pickett, Washington Territory (1859–1863)
  - Post of San Juan, Washington Territory (1863–1867)
- Camp Chehalis, Washington Territory (1860–1861)
- Post at Cape Disappointment, Washington Territory, (1862–1864)
  - Fort Cape Disappointment, Washington Territory, 1864–1875

== See also ==
- Idaho in the American Civil War
- Montana in the American Civil War
- Oregon in the American Civil War
