= Oregon in the American Civil War =

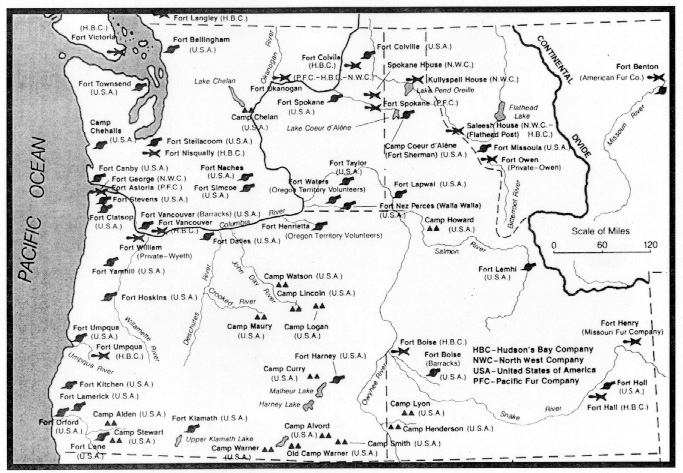
Civil War-era military outposts in the Pacific Northwest

At the outbreak of the American Civil War, Oregon had no organised militia and had sold most of the equipment bought for the Rogue River Wars. The state's governor, John Whiteaker, was pro-slavery and opposed to Oregon's involvement in the conflict. Consequently it was only in late 1862, with a new governor, that the state raised any troops: the 1st Oregon Cavalry served with the Union army until June 1865.

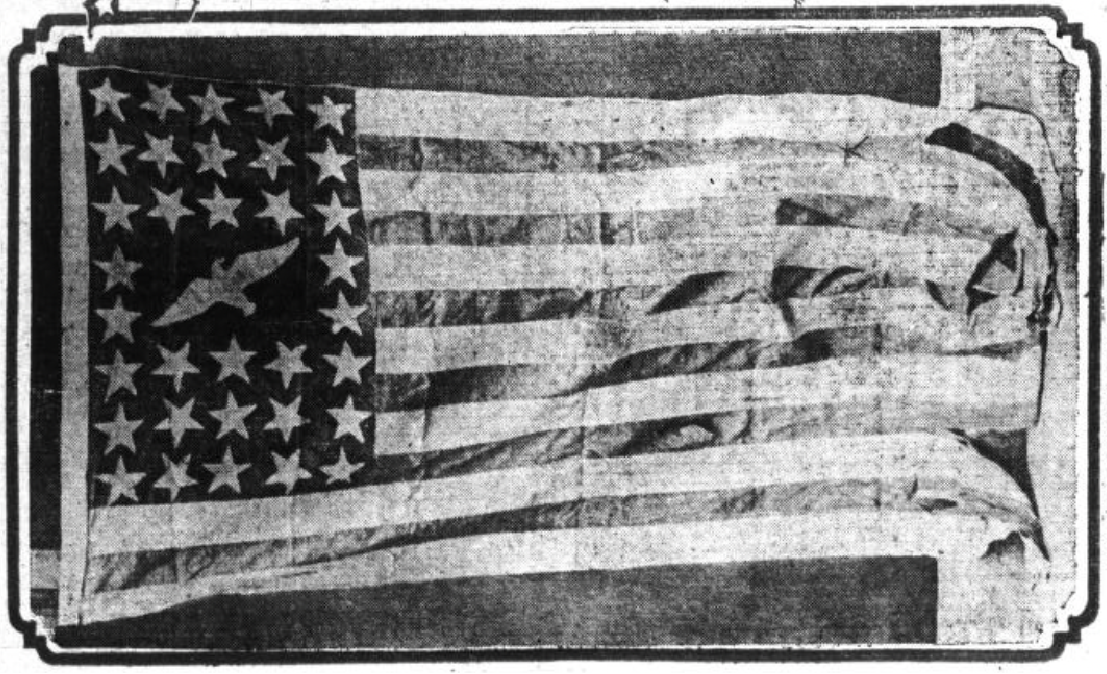
Unique American flag bearing a bald eagle, 7 white stripes and 6 red ones. With the motto "the whole republic" in the bottom white stripe, 1861

During the Civil War, emigrants to the newfound gold fields in Idaho and Oregon continued to clash with the Paiute, Shoshone and Bannock tribes of Oregon, Idaho and Nevada until relations degenerated into the bloody 1864–1868 Snake War. The 1st Oregon Volunteer Infantry Regiment was formed in 1864 and its last company was mustered out of service in July 1867. Both units were used to guard travel routes and Indian reservations, escort emigrant wagon trains, and protect settlers from Indian raiders. Several infantry detachments also accompanied survey parties and built roads in central and southern Oregon.

Oregon's second United States Senator, Col. Edward Dickinson Baker was killed while leading Union troops at the Battle of Ball's Bluff near Leesburg, Virginia on October 21, 1861. His death in battle occurred exactly one month after another Oregonian, Captain James W. Lingenfelter of Company B, 71st Pennsylvania Infantry Regiment, was killed while on the picket line. In civilian life, Captain Lingenfelter had been a practicing attorney in Jacksonville, Oregon. He had been visiting in the East when the war started and enlisted to serve with Colonel Baker.

== Confederate sympathizers ==
In May of 1861, Jacksonville secessionists planned to raise a their own secession flag. During the night, the group stretched a rope across the street and suspended a flag bearing a pine tree on its field. In the morning, it was quickly taken down. A month later, upon hearing the news of the start of the war, citizens across town started flying flags. A lady named Dr. Zany Ganung was walking back into town after a work trip when she spotted a secessionist flag flying in front of J. T. Glenn’s store. The flag bore a Palmetto with a rattlesnake. She soon grabbed an ax, hacked down the flagpole, then took the flag back to her house and put it in her stove, setting it on fire. She was later celebrated for her actions.

In August of 1861, a man named Welch raised a Confederate flag in Yamhill county. He and his secessionist neighbors protected the flag from threats by Unionists.

In 1862, the secessionist residents of Smithfield armed themselves in support of the Confederacy. In the summer, they acquired a small cannon and other weapons. While other members got together to fly the Stars and Bars over town. The flag was soon raised and quickly became noticed by unionists in Eugene who demanded the sheriff take it down. The sheriff, knowing that the residents were armed, declined. Weeks later, one of the towns people was in Eugene trying to buy supplies when he was arrested and taken to the local jail. A mob of unionist tried lynch him, but he fought them with a penknife and held them off for the sheriff and his posse to regain control. In August a detachment of federal troops rode from Fort Vancouver to Smithfield to find a deserter. They located him at a farm and also captured the town's rebel flag.

== Oregon regiments in the Civil War ==
- 1st Oregon Cavalry
- 1st Oregon Volunteer Infantry Regiment
- Mountain Rangers (Oregon Militia)
- Washington Guards (Oregon Militia)
- Fenian Guards (Oregon Militia)
- Zouave Cadets (Oregon Militia)
- Marion Rifles (Oregon Militia)

== Civil War posts, Oregon ==
- Fort Dalles, Oregon, (1850–1867)
- Fort Yamhill, Oregon (1856–1866)
- Fort Hoskins, Oregon, (1857–1865)
- Siletz Blockhouse, Oregon (1858–1866)
- Camp Baker, Oregon (1862–1865),
- Camp Barlow, Oregon, (1862)
- Camp Clackamas, Oregon, (1862)
- Post at Grand Ronde Indian Agency or Fort Lafayette, Oregon 1863,
- Fort Klamath, Oregon, (1863–1890)
- Fort at Point Adams, Oregon (1863–1865)
- Fort Stevens, Oregon (1865–1947)
- Camp Alvord, Oregon (1864–1866)
- Camp Dalgren, Oregon (1864)
- Camp Henderson, Oregon, 1864–1866
- Camp Lincoln, Oregon 1864
- Camp Maury, Oregon 1864
- Camp Russell, Oregon 1864–1865
- Camp Watson, Oregon 1864–1869
- Camp Colfax, Oregon, 1865, 1867
- Camp Currey, Oregon 1865–1866
- Camp Logan, Oregon (1865–1868)
- Camp Lyon, Oregon (1865–1869)
- Camp Polk, Oregon (1865–1866)
- Camp on Silvies River, Oregon (1864?)
- Camp Wright, Oregon (1865–1866)
- Old Camp Warner, Oregon (1866–1867)
- Camp Warner, Oregon (1867–1874)

== See also ==
- Pacific Coast Theater of the American Civil War
- Idaho in the American Civil War
- Montana in the American Civil War
- Washington in the American Civil War
