= Department of the Pacific =

Unit of the Union Army during the American Civil War

The Department of the Pacific or Pacific Department was a major command (Department) of the United States Army from 1853 to 1858. It replaced the Pacific Division, and was itself replaced by the Department of California and the Department of Oregon.

== Formation ==
The Department of the Pacific was created on October 31, 1853, at San Francisco, California, replacing the older Pacific Division, (1848–53) and abolishing the existing 10th (California) and 11th (Oregon) Departments, consolidating them within the new department. The department reported directly to the headquarters of the Army in Washington, D.C. It oversaw the military affairs in the country west of the Rocky Mountains (California, Oregon Territory, and Washington Territory), except for the Utah Territory and the Territory of New Mexico east of the 110th meridian west, (thus including most of modern Arizona and southern Nevada).

On September 2, 1854, the headquarters was moved to Benicia Barracks, in Benicia, California.

From 1855 to 1857 the Puget Sound District was organized.

In January 1857, the headquarters again returned to San Francisco.

On January 14, 1858, the Utah Territory was placed within the department but soon removed into the Department of Utah, in 1858, that remained until 1861.

== Commanders ==
- Brevet Brigadier General Ethan A. Hitchcock 1853–1854
- Brevet Major General John E. Wool 1854–1857
- Brevet Brigadier General Newman S. Clarke 1857–1858

== Posts ==
- Post of Alcatraz Island or Fort Alcatraz, California 1853–1907
- Fort Bellingham, Washington Territory 1855–1860
- Benicia Arsenal, Benicia, California 1851–1964
- Benicia Barracks, California 1852–1866
- Fort Boise, Idaho, 1863–1912
- Fort Bragg, California 1857–1864.
- Fort Churchill, Nevada, 1860–1869
- Fort Colville, Washington Territory, 1825–1870
- Fort Dalles, Oregon, 1850–1867
- Fort Klamath, Oregon, 1863–1890
- Roop's Fort, Fort Defiance, Susanville, California 1853–1863
- Fort Douglas, Utah Territory, 1862–1991
- Drum Barracks, California, 1862–1870
- Fort Gaston, California 1859–1892
- Fort Humboldt, California 1853–1867
- Fort Jones, California, 1852–1858
- Fort Mohave, Arizona Territory 1859–1890
- Fort Point San José, San Francisco, California, 1853–1882
- Fort Point, San Francisco, California 1853–1886
- New San Diego Depot, San Diego, California 1851–1866.
- Fort Steilacoom, Washington Territory, 1849–1868
- Fort Yuma, California 1851–1883
- Fort Vancouver, Washington Territory 1853–1879
- Fort Tejon, California 1854–1861, 1863–1864.
- Camp Burton, California 1855
- Fort Cascades, Washington Territory 1855–1861
- Fort Yamhill, Oregon (1856–1866)
- Fort Simcoe, Washington Territory, 1856–1859
- Fort Townsend, Washington Territory 1856–1861
- Fort Walla Walla, Washington Territory 1856–1911
- Fort Crook, California 1857–1869
- Fort Hoskins, Oregon, 1857–1865
- Fort Ter-Waw, California 1857–1862
- Camp at Pardee's Ranch, California 1858–1865

== Disbandment ==
On September 13, 1858, the Department of the Pacific was disbanded, replaced by two new departments: the Department of California and the Department of Oregon. The Department of California included the territory west of the Rockies, the Umpqua and Rogue River districts in Oregon, Utah and New Mexico. The Department of Oregon included the Oregon and Washington Territories.

== Reborn in the Civil War ==
During the American Civil War the army again reorganized, and on January 15, 1861, the independent Pacific Department was reconstituted by consolidating the Departments of California and Oregon. The first commander of the new Department of the Pacific was Colonel (Brevet Brigadier General) Albert Sidney Johnston who was later to become a prominent General in the Confederate Army.

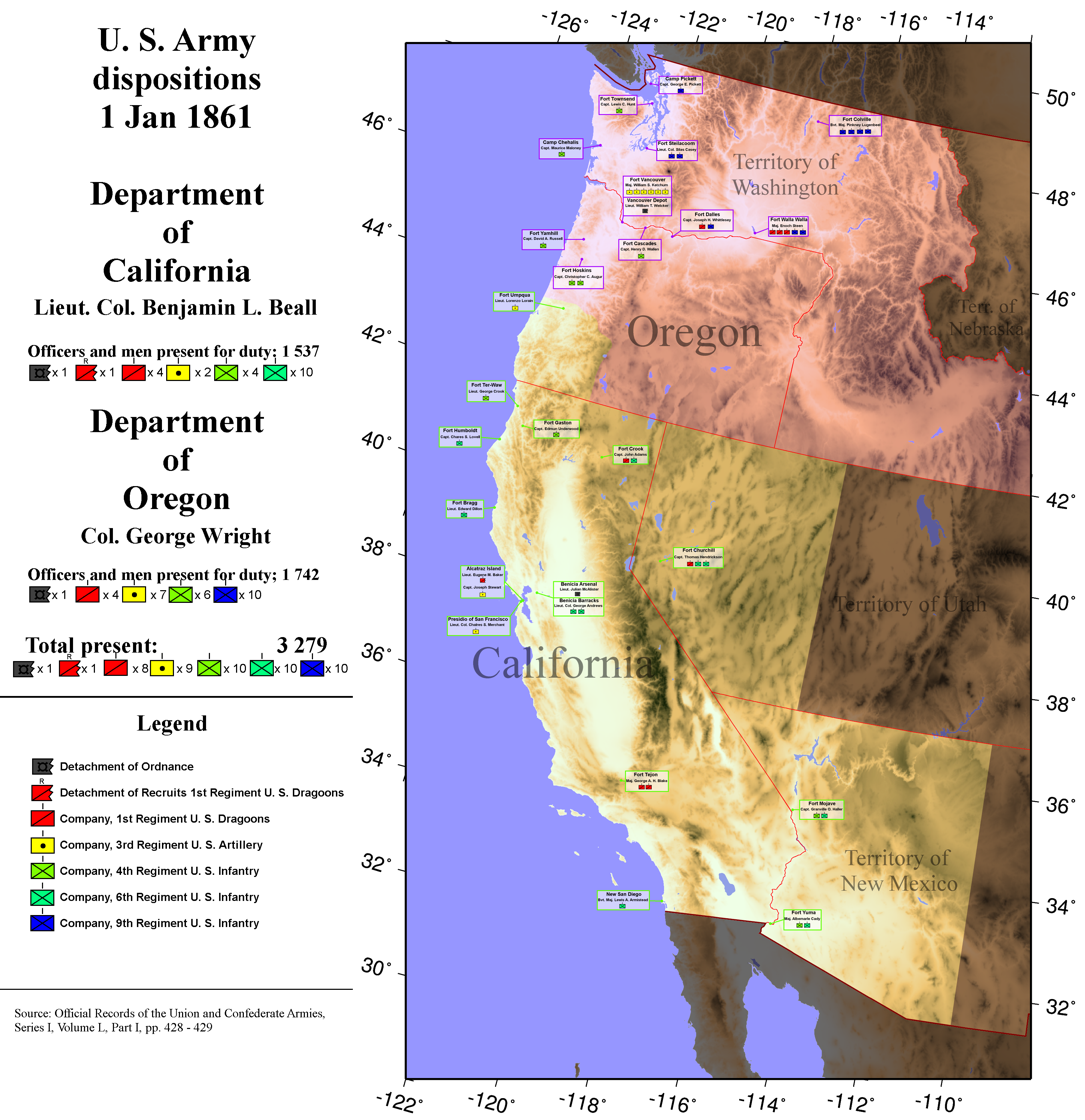
Garrisons of the Departments of California and Oregon 1 January 1861

=== Civil War commanders ===
- Albert Sidney Johnston, 1861 (resigned to join the Confederacy)
- Edwin Vose Sumner, 1861
- George Wright, 1861–1864
- Irvin McDowell, 1864–1865

=== Districts ===
The Department of the Pacific had six subordinate military districts during the Civil War:

- District of Oregon (headquarters at Fort Vancouver) January 15, 1861 – July 27, 1865
- District of California (headquarters at San Francisco, co-located with Department of the Pacific). Independent command from Department from July 1, 1864 – July 27, 1865
- District of Southern California (headquarters at Drum Barracks) September 25, 1861 – July 27, 1865
- District of Humboldt (headquarters at Fort Humboldt) December 12, 1861 – July 27, 1865
- District of Utah (headquarters at Fort Douglas). August 6, 1862 – July 27, 1865
- District of Arizona (headquarters at Prescott) March 7, 1865 – July 27, 1865

== Reorganized out of existence ==
On June 27, 1865, the Military Division of the Pacific was created under Major General Henry W. Halleck, replacing the Department of the Pacific, consisting of the Department of the Columbia that now consisted of the state of Oregon and the territories of Washington and Idaho and the expanded Department of California that now consisted of the states of California and Nevada and the Territory of New Mexico and Territory of Arizona.

== Philippine Expedition ==
On 30 May 1898, Gen. Wesley Merritt established in San Francisco the Headquarters, US Expeditionary Forces and Department of the Pacific for the campaign to support Adm. Dewey's forces in the Philippines during the Spanish–American War.

At the end of March 1900, the complexities involved in dealing with the guerrillas and governing the islands led to the transformation of what had been the Department of the Pacific into the Philippine Department with four geographical departments, each of which was, in turn, divided into military districts. This step also brought an end to the Eighth Corps.

== See also ==
- Arizona in the American Civil War
- California in the Civil War
- Idaho in the American Civil War
- Washington in the American Civil War
- Nevada in the American Civil War
- New Mexico in the American Civil War
- Oregon in the American Civil War
- Utah in the American Civil War
