= Santiam Wagon Road =

- U.S. National Register of Historic Places
- U.S. Historic district
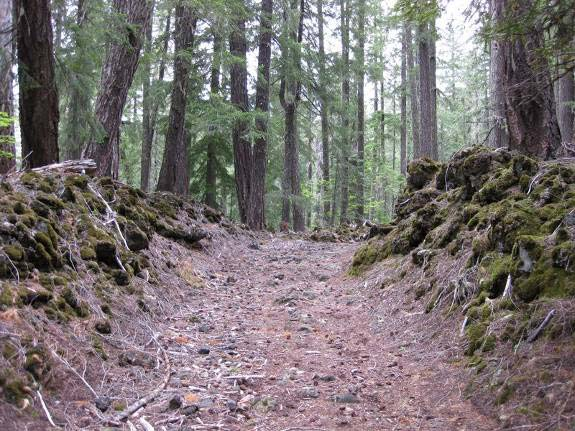
- Lava Field management segment
- Location: Willamette National Forest, Deschutes National Forest
- Nearest city: Cascadia, Sisters
- Coordinates: 44.42471°N 121.84559°W
- Area: 139 acres (56 ha)
- NRHP reference No.: 10000795
- Added to NRHP: September 23, 2010

The Santiam Wagon Road was a freight route in the U.S. state of Oregon between the Willamette Valley and Central Oregon regions from 1865 to the 1930s. It is considered one of the most important historical routes in the state. Officially known as the Willamette Valley and Cascade Mountain Wagon Road, the Santiam Wagon Road was built between 1861 and 1868 and operated as a toll road until 1915. In 1925, the road was turned over to the State of Oregon for use as a highway. U.S. Route 20 closely follows the original route of the wagon road.

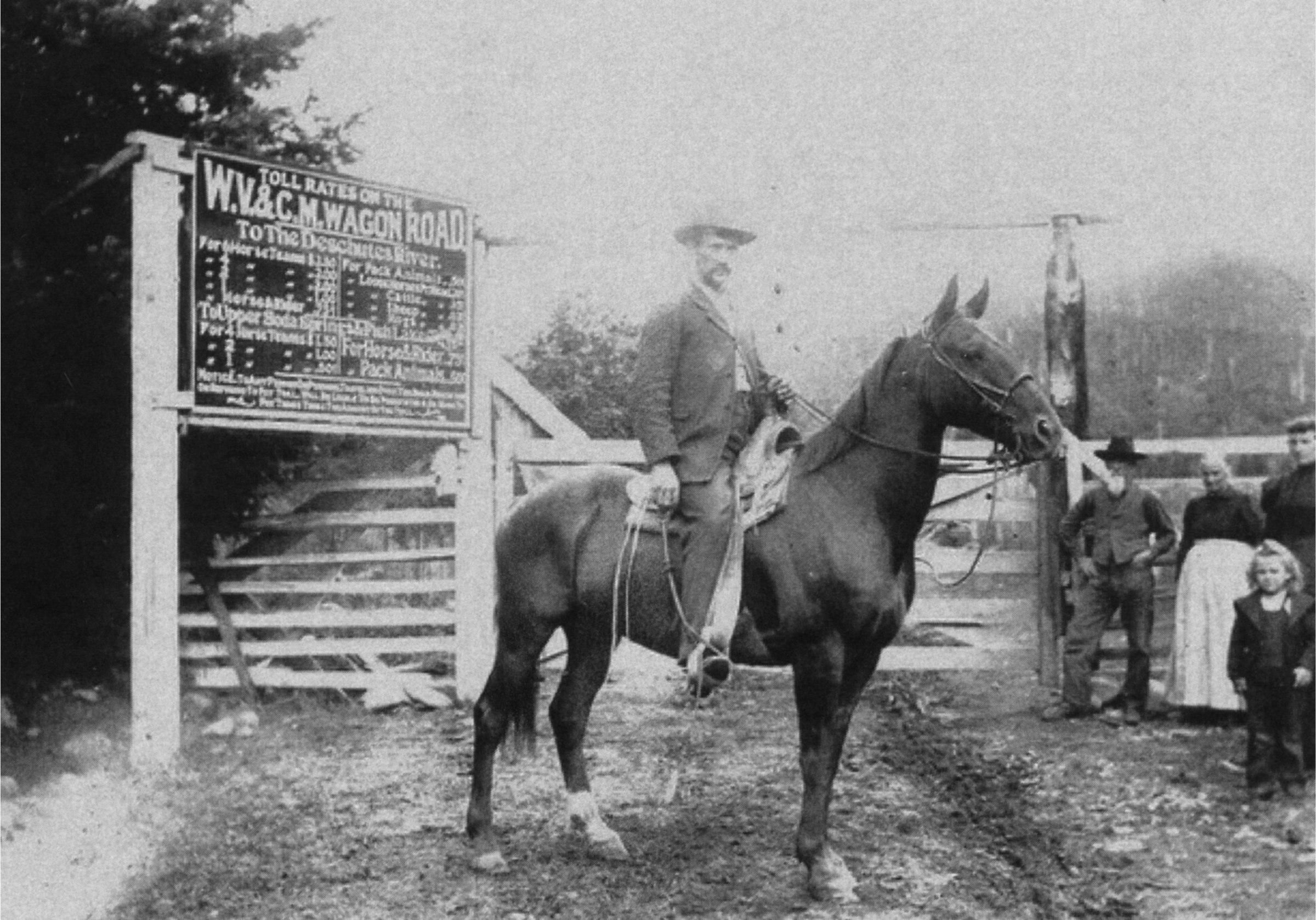
West Tollgate on the Santiam Wagon Road

The road was listed on the National Register of Historic Places in September 2010.

== Route ==
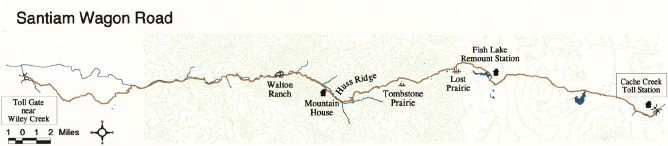
Santiam Wagon Road Map

The original maps filed with the Governor's office contained the following description of the route:

Beginning at Wiley Creek near Foster, the road goes southeasterly around the south side of Moss's Butte, thence northeasterly to a crossing of Canyon Creek at a point about one mile above its mouth, thence parallel to the South Santiam River to a crossing of Fall Creek near its mouth, thence about two miles to a crossing of the Santiam River, thence to three more crossings of the Santiam River in a distance of about two and one half miles, thence easterly about two miles to a fifth crossing of the Santiam River, thence about a mile to a crossing of Soda Fork near its mouth and shortly to a sixth crossing of the Santiam River, thence following up its south bank about 3 miles to a seventh crossing of the Santiam River, thence up Seven-mile Hill and over a summit (Tombstone Pass), thence down the north side of a fork of the McKenzie River (Hackleman Creek), around the north side of Fish Lake, thence easterly across a stretch of lava and up Sand Mountain and around the north side of Big Lake, thence easterly across the Cascade summit and a crossing of Cache Creek where the eastern toll gate (Cache Creek Toll Station) was located, thence northeasterly around the north side of a swamp (The Swamp) and around the southern base of Black Butte, thence east and southeasterly on the north side of a creek (Slough or Indian Ford Creek) to a crossing of Squaw Creek (Whychus Creek) at Camp Polk, thence northeasterly about eight miles to the head of a canyon (McKenzie), thence easterly down the canyon and northeasterly to a crossing of the Deschutes River (Lower Bridge), thence northeasterly and easterly to Crooked River near Smith Rock, thence up the south side to a crossing of Crooked River about 1/2 mile above the mouth of Ochoco Creek, thence easterly about 1/2 mile to a crossing of Ochoco Creek, thence continuing up and crossing it five more times, the last being just above the mouth of a creek entering from the south (Veasie Creek). A map shows the survey going on up Ochoco Creek crossing it five more times before following up the south branch it crosses over a summit into Mt. Prairie Big Summit Prairie, crossing it in a northeasterly direction north of its middle, crossing over a summit and following down Mountain Creek (Badger Creek) to Mountain House on the Dalles City-Canyon City road.

Then from mile post 153 (Veasie Creek) proceeding southeasterly over a summit, thence down a creek about a mile then crossing it and proceeding easterly to Rattlesnake Spring, thence down Lost Creek about 3 miles, thence easterly about 2 miles to a creek (a fork of Lost Creek), thence northeasterly up this creek about 2 miles to near Sheep Rock were it turns easterly 1 1/2 miles to a creek down which it follows about a mile, thence east to a crossing of the North Fork of Crooked River, easterly, southeasterly and easterly to Watson Spring (Jason Wheeler says 300 yards below spring), thence easterly over a ridge and through Paulina Valley passing a butte on its south side and coming to a crossing of the road from Camp Watson to Camp Maury, thence easterly 2 miles to a crossing of the Yreka Trail and 1/2 mile to a crossing of a creek (Beaver Creek), thence a big curve to right 7 miles, thence south up Grindstone Creek on west side and crossing near its head 7 miles, thence on to a crossing of the road from Jacksonville to Canyon City and a mile further to a crossing of Twelvemile Creek, thence south to a creek up which it proceeds south 5 miles (Jason Wheeler says Long Hollow) to a spring, thence south over a ridge to a crossing of Buck Creek, thence southeasterly through 8 to 10 miles of pine timber, through a prairie to Camp Curry at Indian Spring and 1 mile to a crossing of Silver Creek, thence down the north side of Silver Creek 10 miles, thence easterly 20 miles to a crossing of a road from Canyon City to Goose Lake, at Cold Spring, thence northeast 8 miles to a crossing of the Silvies River, thence northeast and easterly, crossing three creeks, 14 miles to Camp Harney on Rattlesnake Creek and a crossing of a road from Canyon City to Camp Warner (the latter crossing to the east side of Rattlesnake Creek just below Camp Harney at mile post 293), thence southerly 1 mile and easterly 4 miles to a crossing of a creek (Cow Creek) and 2 miles to the Boise City road (probably Meek's Cutoff), thence southeast 9 miles to creek crossing (Crowcamp Creek), thence south 8 miles and easterly 7 miles to Creek crossing (Crane Creek) and following north bank 5 miles to second crossing of same creek and still easterly 3 miles to where Camp Smith road turns south, thence southeasterly (they don't show South Fork of Malheur which they had to cross within a mile) 13 miles to a crossing of a creek flowing south and on 8 miles to a creek crossing, thence easterly 4 miles, northeasterly 3 miles and northwesterly 1 mile to a south-flowing creek crossing (Crowley Creek?), thence following up this creek northwesterly and northerly 8 miles (368 mile post), thence northeasterly over a ridge 4 miles to a crossing of a creek flowing to the northwest, thence northwest 3 miles over a ridge to a creek flowing east and down which they follow 3 miles before crossing, thence northeast over a ridge 5 miles, thence northerly down a ridge between Cottonwood Creek and Heath Creek 13 miles to a crossing of Heath's Creek near its mouth and 3 miles to a crossing of Cottonwood Creek, thence northerly 3 and northeasterly 1 mile to a crossing of Cottonwood Creek near its mouth, and a short mile further to a crossing of the Malheur River, thence 35 miles down the north bank of the Malheur River to Washoe Ferry on Snake River.

== See also ==
- Applegate Trail
- Barlow Road
- Black Butte Ranch, Oregon
- Hogg Rock
- Oregon Route 58
- Santiam Pass
