= Camp Polk =

Camp Polk may refer to

- Camp Polk (Oregon) (1865-1866), a former military installation in the U.S. state of Oregon
- Fort Polk, a United States Army post located near Leesville, Louisiana
- Camp Polk (North Carolina) a World War I United States Army post located near Raleigh, home of the Tank Corps
