= Camp Pickett =

Camp Pickett can be:

- Camp Pickett (San Juan Island) on San Juan Island disputed territory with British Canada during the Pig War. Now within San Juan Island National Historical Park.
- Fort Barfoot in Virginia originally Camp Pickett until renamed in 1974.
