= Louis Marshall (disambiguation) =

Louis Marshall (1856–1929) was an American lawyer and Jewish leader.

Louis Marshall may also refer to:

- Louis Marshall (educator) (1773–1866), American educator
- Louis Marshall (rugby league), English rugby league footballer of the 1920s
- Louis Henry Marshall (1827–1890), U.S. Army officer

== See also ==
- Lewis Marshall (born 1988), New Zealand rugby union footballer of the 2010s
