= Winnas Expedition =

1855 attack by the United States Army against the Snake Indians

The Winnas Expedition was an attack by the United States Army against the Snake Indians in 1855, from May 24 to September 8, during the Snake War. It was documented by Granville O. Haller.

== Background ==
On August 20 1854, the Ward Massacre saw a number of settlers travelling along the Boise River killed by natives from the Shoshone tribe. 21 settlers were attacked by the Winnas (variously spelled Winass or Winnass) band, who had tried to steal their horses; after one native was shot with a revolver, the natives killed nearly all of them and captured the rest. Settlers in Western Oregon called for retribution, and Governor George Law Curry raised an army of volunteers in response; however, as winter was then setting in, the expedition was called off. That January, Isaac Stevens and Joel Palmer signed treaties with several tribes in the Willamette Valley, but the United States did not ratify them; this angered the natives further, and moreover, no treaty was obtained with the Shoshone. Haller eventually undertook the expedition to seek out the Winnas band members who were deemed murderers by the Oregon population; in addition to the 56 soldiers brought by Haller from Fort Dalles, 39 settler volunteers and a handful of Nez Perce and Umatilla people joined.
