= Louis Henry Marshall =

- Born: 1827; Virginia, US
- Died: 1891 (aged 63–64)
- Allegiance: United States
- Branch: United States Army
- Conflicts: American Civil War

Louis Henry Marshall (1827–1891) was a native of Virginia and a U.S. Army officer on the frontier in the Antebellum Period, in the American Civil War and in the Snake War.

== Early life ==
Louis Henry Marshall was born in Virginia on May 23, 1828. He was the son of Assistant Adjutant General William Louis Marshall (1803-1879), who served in the Civil War, and Anne Kinloch [Lee] Marshall (1800-1864). His mother was the sister of Robert E. Lee and daughter of Henry Lee III. His father was the son of one-time Transylvania University president Louis Marshall, and brother to three Congressmen: Thomas Francis Marshall, Alexander Keith Marshall, and Edward C. Marshall. His father was also a nephew of Chief Justice John Marshall. His first cousin, once removed was United States Solicitor General William Marshall Bullitt. He was also a second cousin, thrice removed of President Thomas Jefferson.

== Military Career ==
Appointed at large to the United States Military Academy in 1845, Marshall missed serving in the Mexican–American War, attending West Point from July 1, 1845, to July 1, 1849. Graduating 41st of 43 in his class, he was promoted to Brevet Second Lieutenant, 3rd Infantry Regiment, on July 1, 1849. He served in the garrison at Fort Columbus, New York, from 1849 to 1850. Then he was on frontier duty in New Mexico Territory, at Santa Fé in 1850, then at San Elizario, Texas into 1851, then at Cantonment Dawson, New Mexico Territory, where he was promoted Second Lieutenant, March 5, 1851. He next served at Fort Union, New Mexico Territory, to 1852, then again at Santa Fé, to 1853, then escorted a Topographical party from 1853 to 1854.

Marshall next served at Fort Craig, from 1854 to March 3, 1855, where he received his promotion to First Lieutenant, 10th U.S. Infantry Regiment, and an assignment to the Cavalry School for Practice, at Carlisle, Pennsylvania until 1856, when he was assigned to Recruiting service until 1858. Later that year he returned to frontier duty at Camp Floyd, Utah Territory, serving there until 1860, then at Fort Laramie, Nebraska Territory, to 1861, serving as Quartermaster, 10th Infantry Regiment, from July 16 to December 29, 1860, when he was appointed captain, 10th Infantry and granted a leave of absence, in 1861.

== American Civil War ==
=== Campaigns ===
Marshall served in the Union Army during the American Civil War as aide-de-camp to General John Pope, from August, 1861, to July 22, 1865, serving in Missouri Operations, August, 1861, to April, 1862, the Advance upon and Siege of Corinth, April to May, 1862, and the Northern Virginia Campaign, July to September, 1862. Promoted Colonel, Staff – Additional Aide-de‑Camp, June 30, 1862, to July 28, 1865.

=== Department of the Northwest ===
In September 1862, Marshall accompanied General Pope to his command of the Department of the Northwest, following Pope's defeat at the battle of Second Battle of Bull Run, again serving as his Aide-de-camp to July, 1865. He was involved with the Dakota War of 1862 and acted as Commissary of Musters for the Department of the Northwest, from October 16, 1863, to July 22, 1865. During that time Marshall was promoted major, 14th U.S. Infantry Regiment, October 16, 1863, then Brevet Lieutenant Colonel, March 13, 1865, for Gallant and Meritorious Services during the Rebellion.

== Snake War ==
Served: in garrison at Fort Vancouver, Wash., in command of 2d Battalion, 14th Infantry Regiment, Aug. 31, 1865, to March 2, 1866.

When Brevet Brigadier General Frederick Steele took command of the Department of the Columbia, Marshall was given command of the military District of Boise, headquartered at Fort Boise, at March 2, 1866. He arrived at Fort Boise on March 20.

Marshall took command just as the Snakes had begun a raiding over much of eastern Oregon, attacking ranches, stagecoaches and stations, wagons and other travelers on the roads through their territory. The worst of these were three attacks on unarmed or poorly armed Chinese immigrants traveling from California to the Owyhee mining towns on May 19–21, 1866. Called the Chinese Massacres the Snakes killed at least 99 Chinese in the three incidents. After learning of the massacres, Marshall already on the Owyhee River, lead a detachment of infantry, cavalry and artillery, up the Owyhee River in pursuit of a party of Snakes he believed had been involved in the massacres. He caught up with them at the Three Forks of the Owyhee River and fought the Battle of Three Forks, May 27–28, 1866.

While in the District of Boise, Marshall was transferred to 23rd U.S. Infantry Regiment, on September 21, 1866, when his command, the 2d Battalion, 14th Infantry Regiment, was reorganized with the addition of 2 more companies to form the 23rd U.S. Infantry Regiment one of the 10 company infantry regiments formed as the U. S. Army was reduced in size at the end of the Civil War.

Marshall held the command of the District of Boise to November 26, 1866. Under attack by the local press for his failures to quell the Snakes, and in disfavor with his superiors, he was relieved by Captain David Perry, Co. F, 1st Cavalry Regiment, who took temporary command of the district, until Lt. Colonel George R. Crook assumed command on December 11, 1866.

Marshall then served at Fort Vancouver, from January 1, 1867, to April, 1867, and at Fort Dalles, Oregon, from April, 1867 as a Member of Court of Inquiry and Court Martial, until September, 1867. From then he was awaiting orders, to December 3, 1867, when he went on leave of absence, to January, 1868 and was then awaiting orders, to November 23, 1868, when he resigned from the U.S. Army.

== Later life ==
Following his resignation from the Army, Marshall took up farming in San Bernardino County, California in the vicinity of Cucamonga. He died at the age of 67, on October 8, 1891, at Monrovia, California.
