= Reuben F. Maury =

American Army colonel

Reuben Fry Maury (1824 – 1906) was a colonel of the 1st Oregon Cavalry during the American Civil War, and the last commander of the District of Oregon in 1865.

Maury was a graduate of the United States Military Academy at West Point, where he and George E. Pickett were classmates. He was a veteran of the Mexican War, and became an Oregon pioneer in 1852. He was a major of the 1st Oregon Cavalry, eventually reaching the rank of colonel. He conducted operations in Oregon and the Idaho Territory and fought in the first part of the Snake War. He was commander of the District of Oregon from March 23, 1865, to June 27, 1865. He was a resident of Jackson County, Oregon, for many years, and died near Jacksonville, Oregon on February 20, 1906.

The Maury Mountains, in Crook County, Oregon, are named for him.
