= Mountain Rangers =

Mountain Rangers 1st Regiment 1st Brigade Oregon State Militia
- Reconstruction of the National flag carried by the militia, 1865
- Active: 1863–1867
- Country: United States
- Allegiance: Union
- Branch: Militia
- Engagements: American Civil War

Mountain Rangers was the nickname of an Oregon militia regiment formed during the American Civil War. A mounted unit, the Mountain Rangers were officially Company A, 1st Regiment, 1st Brigade, Oregon State Militia.

During the Civil War the State of Oregon organized militias to replace the Federal troops who had been recalled for the war. Organized on May 18, 1863, in Ashland, the Mountain Rangers were organized as an independent military company, the only one in Southern Oregon. The men approved a constitution and bylaws, and elected their officers and NCO's. They agreed to buy military fatigue caps, furnish their own horses and wear grey shirts and blue overalls. Officers wore U. S. military uniforms. For the Fourth of July, the Mountain Rangers ordered new uniforms with matching dark blue coats and pants. Jackson County officials rented a saloon in Ashland to serve as an armory for weapons and ammunition supplied by the state.

The Rangers were primarily a marching and social organization with many of the region's leading citizens in the ranks. Prominent Oregon pioneer Abel Helman served as captain. A highlight for the Oregon militiamen was the Military Ball at the Ashland Hotel on Jan. 8, 1864, in celebration of the anniversary of the Battle of New Orleans. In 1865, a group of ladies from Ashland and the nearby area got together and started construction of a American flag for the unit. The 36-star flag was later sent to San Francisco, California to have the stars embroidered in gold before being presented to the company.

The Mountain Rangers are one of the best documented Oregon militia units because of the meticulous journal kept by company journalist and future captain Oliver Applegate.

The Oregon volunteer troops were demobilized beginning in 1866 when federal troops moved back into the northwest. No longer did the citizens of Oregon nor the state legislature consider the need for a well-armed and disciplined reserve force.

== See also ==
- Oregon in the American Civil War
