= Fort Bellingham =

Coordinates: 48°47′00″N 122°33′22″W

Fort Bellingham (1856–1860) was a U.S. Army fort built to prevent attacks by Native Americans from British Columbia, Canada and from Alaska, on the bayside villages of Fairhaven, Sehome and Whatcom.

The site for the new fort was on a prairie that overlooked Bellingham Bay. It was the only open space on the bay and had a spring. A settler, Maria Roberts, had to be evicted to build the fort, but she and her husband were later allowed to build a cabin on the beach.

The fort was built by U.S. Army Captain George E. Pickett and Company D of the 9th U.S. Infantry Regiment sent from Fort Steilacoom. Construction started August 26, 1856.

The fort was an 80-yard square stockade with three gates. Two blockhouses of two stories lay at opposite corners, flanking the stockade walls loopholed for rifles and mountain howitzers. Within the stockade were wood-framed one-story buildings including the barracks, storehouses, officers quarters, mess hall, kitchen, and bakery.

In July 1859, the Pig War broke out on San Juan Island when an American settler, Lyman Cutlar, shot a Hudson's Bay Company pig. Brigadier General William S. Harney, Department of Oregon commander, learned that British authorities in Victoria had threatened to arrest Cutlar and dispatched Pickett's company from Fort Bellingham to the island to protect American interests. In response, the British sent warships and a detachment of marines. While the opposing forces that summer were facing off at San Juan Island, Pickett's men returned and dismantled pieces of Fort Bellingham including one of the blockhouses and reassembled them on the island's southern shore creating "Camp Pickett" later called "Post of San Juan".

What remained of Fort Bellingham was removed by units later occupying the San Juan Island post to improve or repair buildings in their camp. In 1861, the Washington Territorial Legislature asked the federal government to post at least one company at the fort to keep it open, but that never occurred. The fort officially closed in 1863. By then, only the blockhouse on the northwest corner and a few other structures remained.

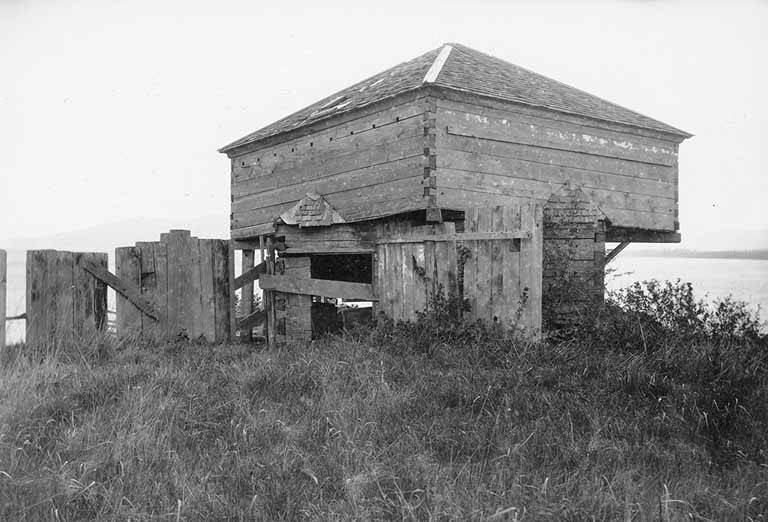
Remains of Fort Bellingham, 1894

In 1868, the Army returned 320 acres (1.3 km^{2}) to Mrs. Roberts, who lived there for many years thereafter and farmed the land. In 1897, the blockhouse burned down. Few traces of the fort remain today. The officer's quarters (that housed Capt. George E. Pickett and his Indian wife) is preserved at 910 Bancroft Street in the Lettered Streets neighborhood of Bellingham, Washington. The site of the fort is several miles north along the shore of the bay, closer to the mouth of the Nooksack River.

== Sources ==
- Hart, Herbert M., Tour Guide to Old Western Forts, Pruett Publishing Co., Boulder CO, 1980, ISBN 0-87108-568-2, page 180.
- Frazer, Robert W., Forts of the West, University of Oklahoma Press, Norman OK, 1965, ISBN 0-8061-1250-6, page 167.
