= Justus Steinberger =

American army colonel

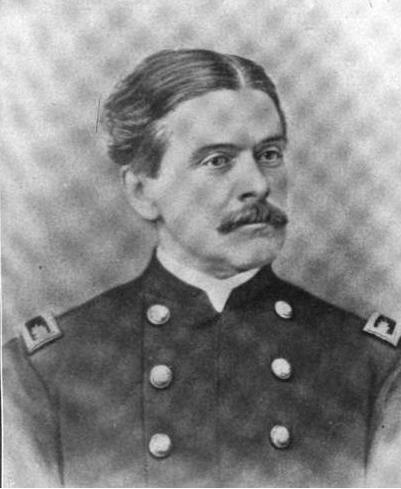
- Born: 1826
- Died: October 13, 1870 (aged 43–44); Helena, Montana, U.S.
- Burial place: Fort Shaw
- Military career
- Conflicts: American Civil War

Justus Steinberger, (c. 1825–1870) was Colonel of the 1st Regiment Washington Territory Volunteer Infantry during the American Civil War. Born in Pennsylvania, before the Civil War he was employed as agent for the Pacific Mail Steamship Company, and the Adams Express Company in Portland, Oregon. On October 12, 1861 he was appointed as colonel, with authority to raise a regiment in Washington Territory and California. From May 5, 1862 - July 7, 1862 he was the commander of the District of Oregon. After the war, he was given a commission as a major in the regular army in 1866, serving in the pay department. He was killed after being thrown from his horse at Helena, Montana in October 13, 1870, and was buried at Fort Shaw.
