= Camp Henderson =

Former military outpost in Oregon

Coordinates: 42°48′16″N 117°43′58″W

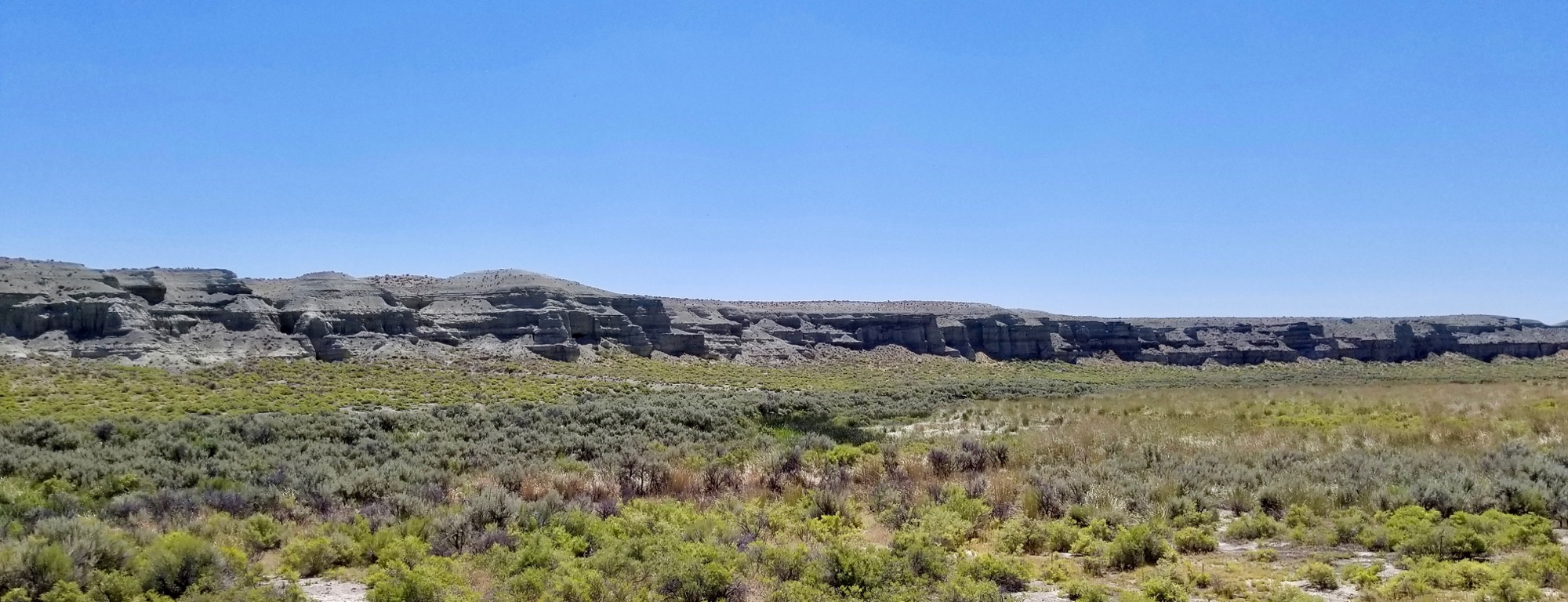
Location of Camp Henderson

Camp Henderson was a military outpost in the District of Oregon in 1864, built on Crooked Creek about five miles from where it joins the Owyhee River, 330 miles from Walla Walla. The camp was located at the foot of cliffs on the east side of the valley south of an historical marker located along the highway (Oregon 78, U.S. 95) about six miles east of Burns Junction, Oregon.

A detachment of the 1st Oregon Cavalry Regiment established the camp in mid spring 1864, and named it after James Henry Dickey Henderson, one of Oregon's first congressmen. This camp, near the mouth of Jordan Creek, was the center of operations for the Snake War in Southeastern Oregon for some time afterward.

Camp Henderson was abandoned March 25, 1866, leaving no trace of it today except for the names of soldiers that carved their names into the cliffs behind the camp.
