= J. M. Chapman =

Privateering vessel

J. M. Chapman, a 90-ton schooner, was purchased in 1863, by Asbury Harpending and other California members of the Knights of the Golden Circle in San Francisco to outfit as a Confederate privateer.

Harpending's plan to capture Pacific Mail Steamship Company ships along the Pacific coast carrying gold and silver shipments to Panama. He intended to then take what he seized to support the Confederacy. The plan attempt was detected and a boarding party made up of crew from the United States Navy sloop-of-war USS Cyane, revenue officers, and San Francisco Police Department officers seized the ship and its crew on the night of their intended departure.

The ship was lost in December 1864 on a voyage between Shoalwater Bay in Queensland, Australia, and San Francisco.
