= Camp Warner =

Former military outpost in Oregon, US

Fort Warner
- Lake County, Oregon, U.S.A.
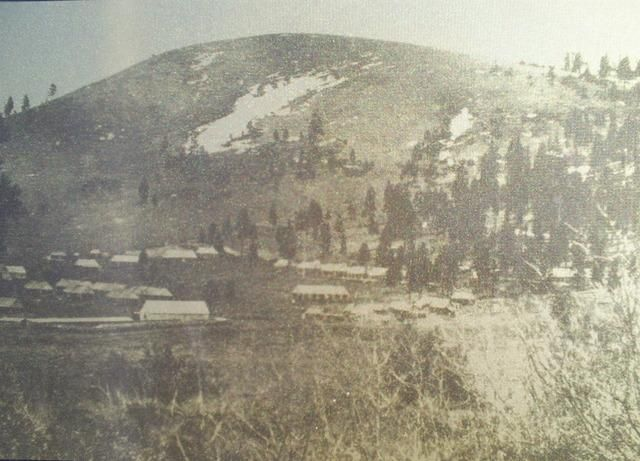
- Fort Warner near Honey Creek in 1873

Site information
- Type: Military cantonments
- Owner: U.S. Government (Old Camp Warner); private property (Fort Warner)

Location
- Coordinates: 42.43025°N 119.72926°W 42.39839°N 120.13767°W

Site history
- Built: Old Camp Warner, 1866; Fort Warner, 1867
- Built by: United States Army
- In use: 1866–1874

Camp Warner was a United States Army outpost in south-central Oregon, United States. Camp Warner was located at two different sites approximately 35 miles (56 km) apart. The Army called both sites Camp Warner. However, the first site became known as Old Camp Warner. It was used as winter quarters in 1866–1867 and then abandoned. The second, more developed site is generally known as Fort Warner (or New Camp Warner), although the Army never officially designated it as a fort. Fort Warner was used as a supply depot and administrative headquarters from 1867 to 1874 during a protracted Army campaign against Northern Paiute bands in Eastern Oregon and Northern California. Today, nothing remains of either Old Camp Warner or Fort Warner.

== Old Camp Warner ==
In 1865, the Army decided it needed an outpost in the Warner Valley of south-central Oregon to facilitate the interdiction of Indian raiding parties passing through the area. Army scouts from Fort Vancouver selected a site along Honey Creek on the west side of the Warner Lakes in what is today Lake County, Oregon. In 1866, a unit of the 14th Infantry Regiment was sent from Fort Boise to establish the fort. The 14th Infantry came by way of Fort Harney, arriving on the east side of the Warner Lakes in late summer. The Army was unable to cross the Warner Lakes, a chain of lakes and wetlands that stretches more than 70 miles (110 km) north to south. As a result, the soldiers decided to build their outpost 20 miles (32 km) east of the lakes on the eastern slope of Hart Mountain. It was completed on August 10, 1866. The post was named Camp Warner after Captain William H. Warner, a topographical engineer who had explored the area before being killed by Indians in 1849.

The camp was hastily built at an elevation of 6,171 feet (1,881 m), so it was not well suited for the harsh winters typical of Oregon's high desert country. As a result, the men had a very difficult winter. It was reported that on several occasions, it was so cold inside the camp building the entire detachment had to march around the parade ground all night to keep from freezing. One sergeant did freeze to death during a winter snow storm.

== Fort Warner ==
In the spring of 1867, the 14th Infantry was replaced by a company of the 23rd Infantry Regiment. In February, General George Crook visited Camp Warner. Crook directed that the camp be moved to the Honey Creek site west of the Warner Lakes. To get the Army's wagons and equipment across the wetlands, forty men under the command of Captain James Henton were assigned to build a bridge across a narrow, marshy channel between Hart Lake and Crump Lake. The bridge was constructed between May 16 and July 24, 1867. Known as the Stone Bridge, it was actually a quarter mile long causeway constructed by hauling basalt boulders and smaller rocks from nearby Hart Mountain and dumping them into the marsh. Shortly after the bridge was begun, Crook sent a second detachment ahead to construct the new camp. On July 31, 1867, the Army moved into the new camp.

Initially, Crook proposed that the new post be named Camp Wood. However, in a formal dispatch dated August 28, 1867, Major General Henry W. Halleck, commander of the Military Department of the Pacific, disapproved naming the post Camp Wood and suggested retaining the name Camp Warner. The soldiers assigned to the post called it Fort Warner to distinguish it from the original Camp Warner, which was only 35 miles (56 km) away. While the Army never officially designated it as a fort, the post became widely known as Fort Warner. Today, most modern maps, including United States Geological Survey topographical maps, identify the site as Fort Warner.

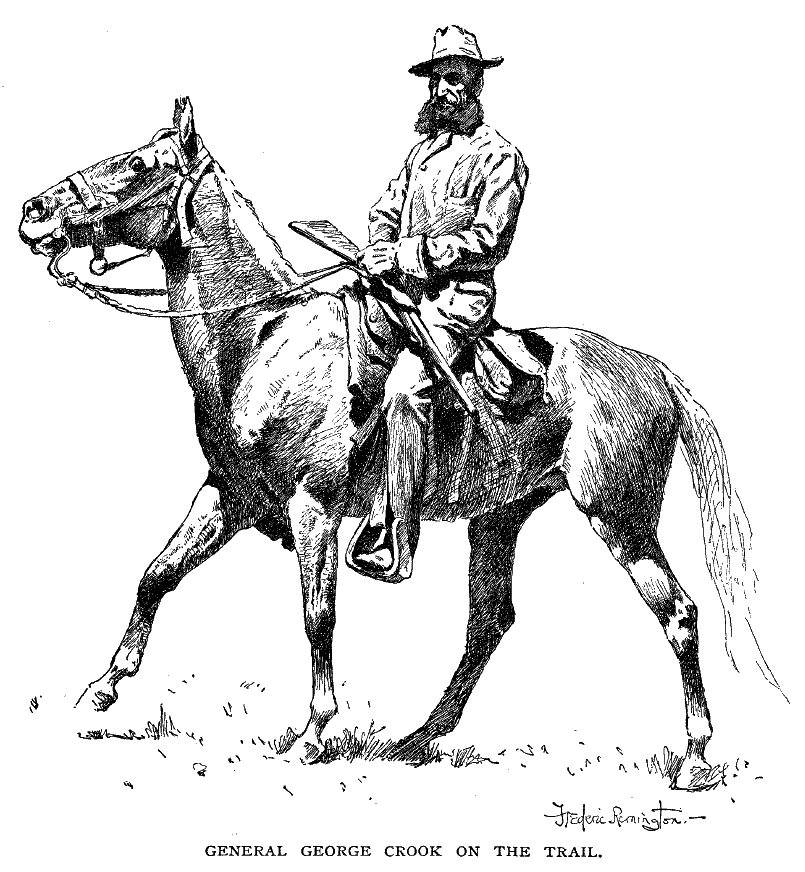
General George Crook on patrol in Indian country

Fort Warner was located on the west side of the Warner Valley, in a pine forest 15 miles (24 km) from the lakes. The new site had a large freshwater spring and enough good timber to support a sawmill. This allowed the soldiers to construct solid timber frame barracks for 280 troops, officer's quarters, a guard house, commissary, hospital, bakery, blacksmith shop, wheelwright workshop, warehouses, stables, and corrals. In addition, Fort Warner was roughly 500 feet (150 m) lower in elevation than Old Camp Warner so milder winters were anticipated at the new location. However, the elevation at Fort Warner was 5,678 feet (1,731 m) above sea level so winters were still quite severe.

Fort Warner was an Army supply depot and administrative headquarters from 1867 until 1874. During the first two years of that period, General Crook led companies from the 1st Cavalry Regiment and 8th Cavalry Regiment, mounted infantry from the 9th Infantry Regiment and 23rd Infantry Regiment, and Indian scouts from the Wasco and Warm Springs tribes in a successful campaign against Northern Paiute bands in Eastern Oregon and Northern California. This was part of the conflict known as the Snake War. Fort Warner was one of several outposts used to refit and resupply Crook's troops during the campaign. Mrs. Crook and several other military wives arrived in 1867 and made Fort Warner their home.

By 1869, the Indian raids in south-central Oregon had ended and a treaty had been signed with Wewawewa, the chief of the area's dominant Paiute band. In 1872, Fort Warner was manned by the D Company of the 21st Infantry Regiment. However, with no Indian raiders left in the area, Fort Warner was abandoned on September 3, 1874.

== Historic sites ==
Today, very little evidence of Army occupation remains at either Old Camp Warner or Fort Warner. The original Camp Warner site is now part of the Hart Mountain National Antelope Refuge. There is virtually nothing left to mark the camp except for two Army graves. The Fort Warner site is located on a privately owned ranch adjacent to Fremont National Forest. No Army buildings remain at the Fort Warner location, but the footprints where structures once stood can still be identified. While nothing remains at either military site, the Stone Bridge the Army built to cross the Warner wetlands still exists and is listed on the National Register of Historic Places.
