= Fort Townsend State Park =

State park in Washington (state), United States

Fort Townsend Historical State Park
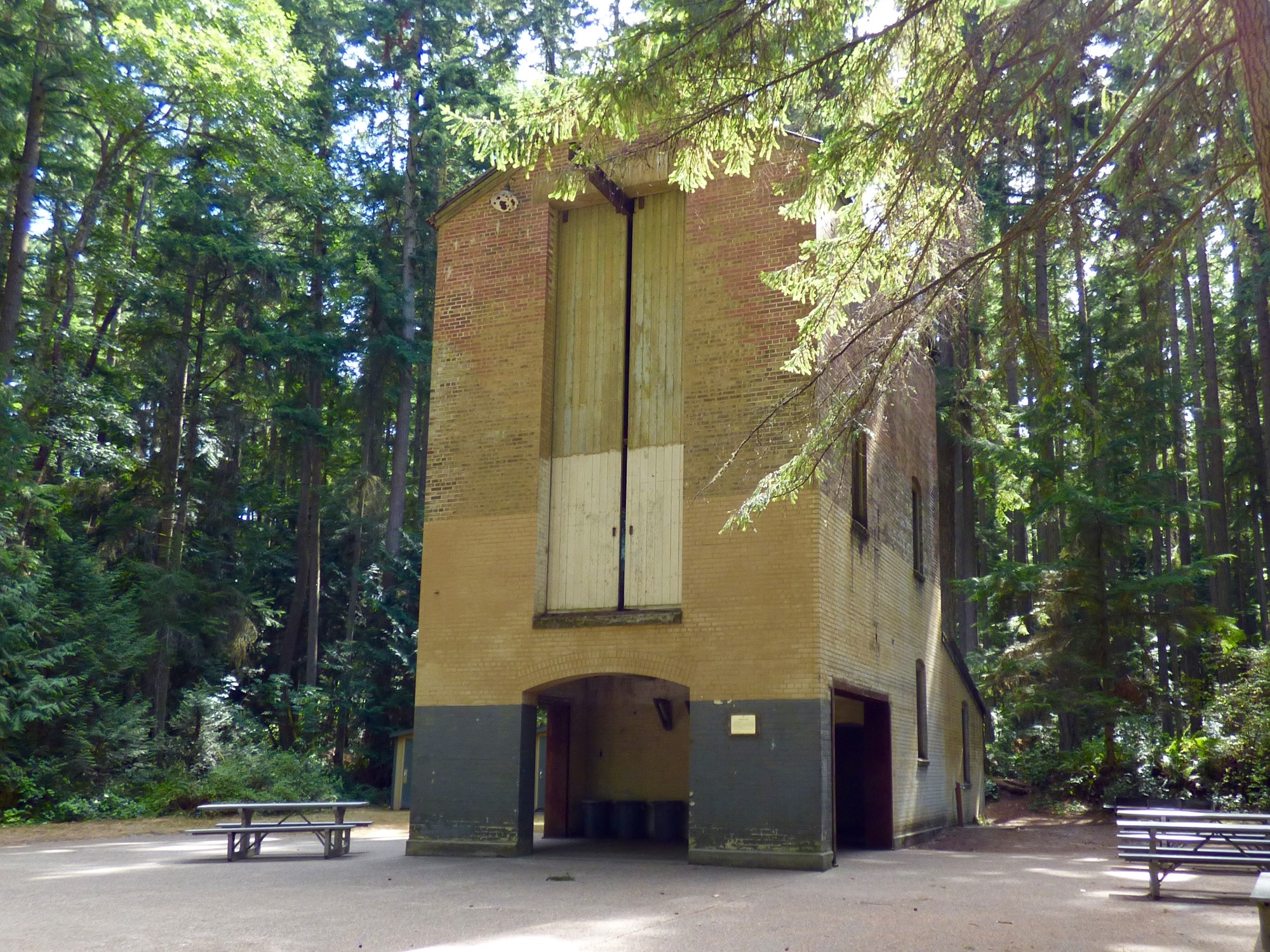
- Explosives laboratory for defusing enemy mines and torpedoes

- Location within Washington (state) Location within the United States
- Location: Jefferson County, Washington, United States
- Coordinates: 48°04′24″N 122°47′22″W
- Area: 367 acres (149 ha)
- Elevation: 190 ft (58 m)
- Established: 1953
- Administrator: Washington State Parks and Recreation Commission
- Website: Official website

Fort Townsend State Park (formerly Old Fort Townsend State Park) is a public recreation area located two miles south of Port Townsend in Jefferson County, Washington. The state park occupies a third of the site of the original Fort Townsend built in 1856. The park includes 3,960 feet (1,210 m) of shoreline on Port Townsend Bay, picnicking and camping areas, 6.5 miles (10.5 km) of hiking trails, and facilities for boating, fishing, and crabbing.

== History ==
Fort Townsend was built in 1856 by the U.S. Army to protect settlers. The entire garrison was transferred to the American Camp or Camp Pickett on San Juan Island in 1859 during the border dispute called the Pig War. Reactivated in 1874, the fort continued in use until fire destroyed the barracks in late 1894; it was abandoned in 1895. The site was retained on the Army rolls until World War II, when it was used as a munitions defusing station. Washington State Parks took custody in 1953, and it became a state park.

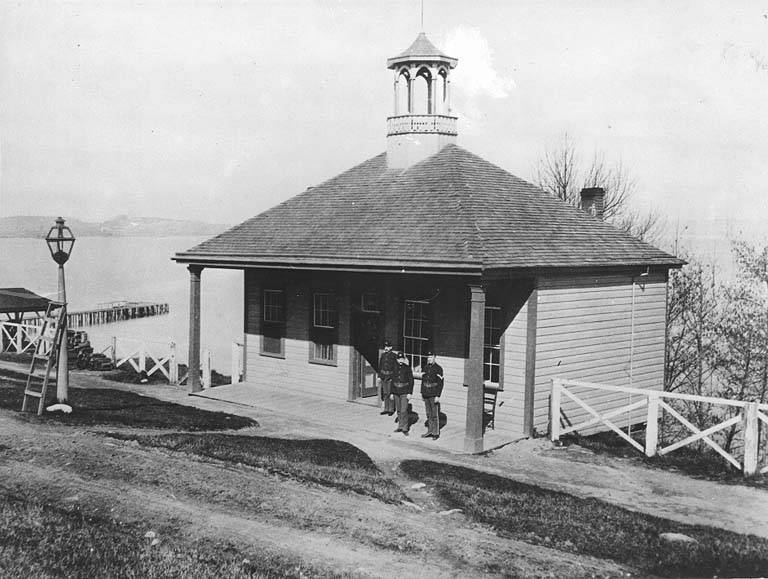
Guard House at Fort Townsend, ca. 1885

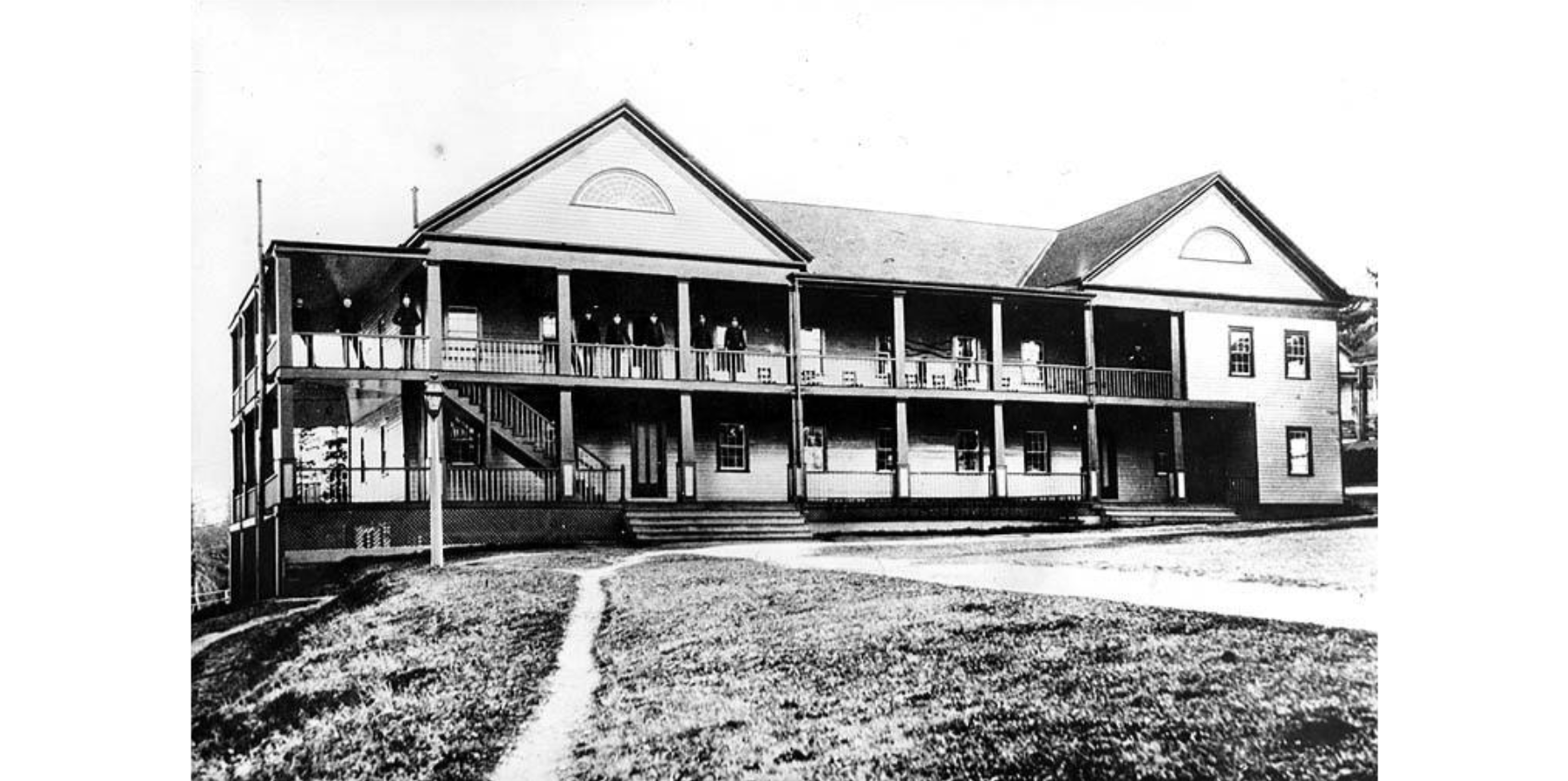
Barracks at Fort Townsend, ca. 1885

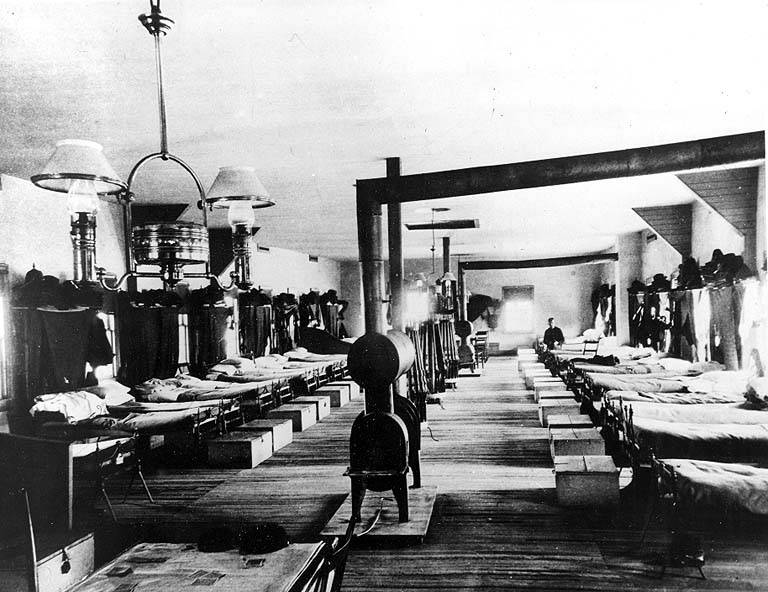
Barracks interior, Fort Townsend, ca. 1885
