= Camp Chehalis =

Coordinates: 46.895°N 124.105°W

Camp Chehalis, sometimes referred to as Fort Chehalis, was a military establishment at the mouth of the Chehalis River near Hoquiam and Grays Harbor, Washington Territory. It was established in 1860 by Captain Maurice Maloney and a garrison of three other officers and 52 enlisted men. Abandoned by the Army on June 19, 1861, at the request of acting Territorial Governor Henry M. McGill, it was reoccupied in August by a detachment under 2nd Lieutenant C. D. Emory, U.S. 9th Infantry Regiment, "to restore confidence to the settlers in that quarter and to afford protection to the Indian agent and his party in establishing themselves at the agency."
