= Idaho Territory in the American Civil War =

The history of Idaho in the American Civil War is atypical, as the territory was far from the battlefields.

At the start of the Civil War, modern-day Idaho was part of the Washington Territory. On March 3, 1863, the Idaho Territory was formed, consisting of the entirety of modern-day Idaho, Montana, and all but southwest Wyoming. However, there were concerns about Confederate sympathizers in the eastern half of the territory, in what is present-day Montana. As a result, in 1863 Sidney Edgerton traveled quickly to see President Abraham Lincoln about the situation; this was one reason to split the Montana Territory from the Idaho Territory. The split also resulted in most of Idaho Territory's land consisting of modern-day Wyoming being reassigned to the Dakota Territory.

Volunteer soldiers who served in Idaho did not fight against the Confederacy, but instead monitored traffic along the Oregon Trail and protected communications routes between the western and eastern United States. Fort Boise, at the site of the city of Boise was founded on July 3, 1863. Old Fort Boise near the present day city of Parma was a French-Canadian fur trading post (thus where the name Boise comes from) and was built by the Hudson's Bay Company in 1834. It became one with the Snake River in 1854, and although the French began to rebuild, they later abandoned it. Many people are confused by the two forts of the same name.

Gold had been found at Orofino and Florence, Idaho that brought trouble with the friendly Nez Perce tribe. Camp Lapwai—later Fort Lapwai—was established to keep the peace between the Indians and the miners.

The Bear River massacre took place on January 29, 1863, on what was thought to be the boundary of Washington Territory and Utah Territory near the present-day city of Preston in Franklin County, Idaho. On that date, 300 soldiers of the 3rd California Volunteer Infantry Regiment led by Colonel Patrick Connor slaughtered an encampment of at least 250 members of the Shoshone tribe; only about twenty Shoshone men survived. This was in response to numerous attacks against white settlers in the previous year which were blamed on the Shoshone. The incident saw little coverage outside California and Utah, as most major newspapers were concerned with news of the main war fronts. The Bear River Massacre Site is currently a National Historic Landmark.

There were some Southerners in the territory at the time. Most had originally gone to California, and came to Idaho to pursue gold mining.

In the early part of the Civil War, Oregon and California Volunteer patrols had several clashes with the Paiute, Bannock and Shoshone bands in Oregon and the Territories of Washington (later Idaho), Utah, and Nevada collectively known as the Snake Indians. However the invasion of their territory by miners in 1863, to places like Silver City, brought on the Snake War. The Volunteers fought the Snakes until relieved by Federal troops in late 1865; the war continued until 1868.

After the Civil War, Idaho attracted many veterans of the Union Army to the state, including several governors. An Idaho Soldiers Home was constructed during the 1890s. In the 20th century, the deaths of veterans routinely made the news. The last Civil War veteran to die in Idaho was Israel Broadsword in 1952.

== Civil War Posts Washington Territory, Idaho Territory (after March 3, 1863) ==
- Fort Franklin (1860–1863), Franklin, Idaho
- Old Fort Hall (1863), Fort Hall Indian Reservation, 11 miles west of the town of Fort Hall.
  - Fort Hall (1864), on Spring Creek just north of Old Fort Hall.
    - Camp Lander (1865–1866), located three miles southeast of Old Fort Hall.
- Camp Salmon Falls (1862), located on the Snake River north of Buhl, on the Oregon Trail.
- Camp Conner (1863–1865), Soda Springs, Idaho
- Fort Boise (1863–1879), Boise
- Camp Lapwai (1862–1863), Lapwai (Nez Perce National Historic Park)
  - Fort Lapwai (1863–1866, 1866–1884), Lapwai (Nez Perce National Historic Park)
- Samuel Smith's Camp (1864), near the mouth of the Raft River.
- Camp Reed (1865–1866), near Twin Falls on old Kelton Road near its crossing of Rock Creek.
- Camp Wallace or Cantonment Soldier (1865), located on the Big Camas Prairie near Fairfield, Idaho.
- Camp Lyon (1865–1869), Idaho, near Jordan Valley, Oregon on Jordan Creek within one mile of the state line.

== See also ==
- History of Idaho
- Montana in the American Civil War
- Grand Army of the Republic Hall (Boise, Idaho)
