= Camp Watson =

US Army camp in Oregon (1864–1869)

Coordinates: 44°29′07″N 119°53′38″W

Camp Watson was a United States Army camp in central Oregon which operated from 1864 through 1869.

== History ==
Camp Watson was established by Oregon Volunteers on July 12, 1864. The 1st Oregon Cavalry built several log buildings, but no surrounding palisade. The camp was moved from its original location to another one four miles away on October 1. The location was chosen to protect the route of the Dalles-Boise Military Road and its travelers, notably gold miners, from attacks by "Snake Indians" during the Snake War. The Regular Army took over the operation of Camp Watson in May 1866, and the camp was abandoned on May 24, 1869.

== Naming ==
The camp was named for Second Lieutenant Stephen Watson, who was killed in battle with Snake Indians on May 18, 1864, at Luelling Springs, Oregon. His body was recovered the following day and buried temporarily at Camp Maury until a metal coffin was sent from Fort Dalles, at which point he was moved to Fort Vancouver, Washington where he now lies.

== Today ==
Today the location of Camp Watson is in Wheeler County, Oregon near the unincorporated area of Antone, approximately twenty-three miles east-southeast of the town of Mitchell (all of which were founded after Camp Watson was abandoned).

== See also ==
- John M. Drake
