= Camp Polk (Oregon) =

1865–1866 post of the United States Army in Oregon, US

Coordinates: 44.31889°N 121.51444°W

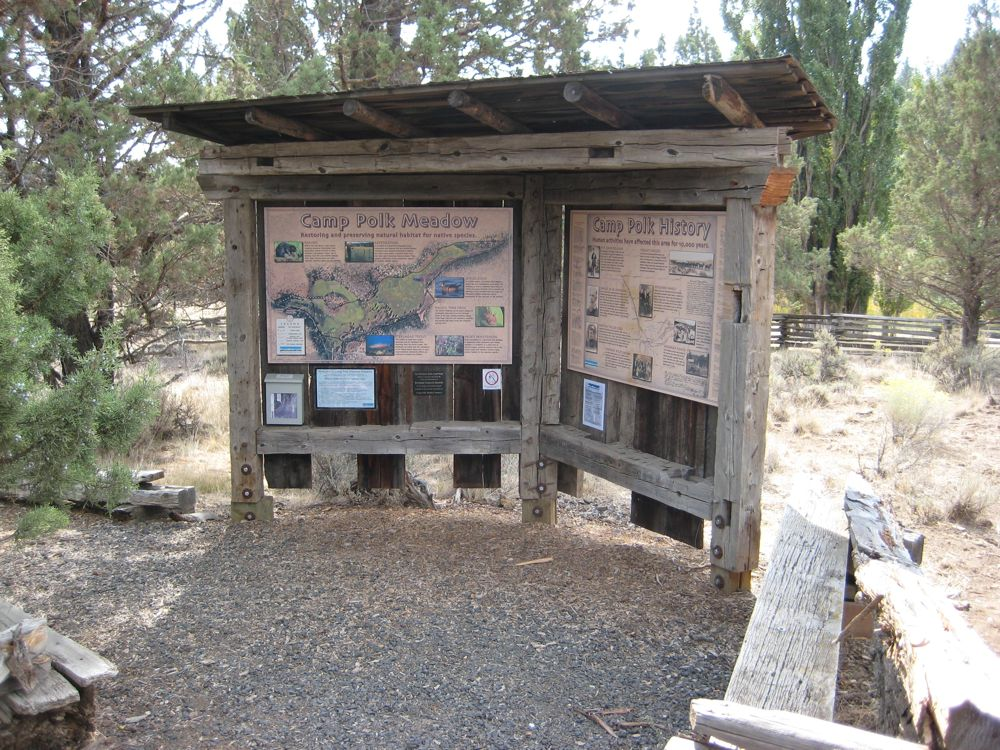
Camp Polk Kiosk

Camp Polk was a former army camp in the U.S. state of Oregon that was established in Deschutes County in 1865. It was a post of the District of Oregon. One of nine camps created during a time of conflict between settlers and Native Americans, it was located three miles northeast of the present-day city of Sisters. The camp was intended to house troops who would protect settlers on the Santiam Wagon Road from Indian attack. Part of Company A, a group of volunteer soldiers from the Willamette Valley under the command of Captain Charles La Follette, were stationed at the post. The camp was named for Polk County, which was the home of most of the soldiers and their captain. The troops received orders before winter in 1865 to leave the camp. A portion of the troops remained at the post until the spring of 1866 when Camp Polk was abandoned.

Later the area was homesteaded by the Hindman family. Today part of the former area of Camp Polk is preserved by the Deschutes Basin Land Trust as the Camp Polk Meadow Preserve. The Hindmans' 1871 barn on the preserve is Deschutes County's oldest structure.
