= Snake War =

1864–1868 armed conflict between Native Americans and settlers

- Part of the American Indian Wars
Date	1864 to 1868
Location	Oregon, Nevada, California, Idaho
Result	United States victory

Belligerents
United States	Snake Indians:

Commanders and leaders
Benjamin Alvord; Reuben F. Maury; George B. Currey; Frederick Steele; Louis H. Marshall; George Crook; Billy Chinook; William C. McKay	Wewawewa; Howluck; Po-li-ni; Paunia; Egan; Paulina; Oytes; Winnemucca; Ocheho

Strength
1864–65; 1st Oregon Cavalry; 1st Regiment Washington Territory Volunteer Infantry; 1st Nevada Cavalry; 1864–67; 1st Oregon Infantry; 1866–68; U.S. 14th Infantry Regiment; U.S. 1st Cavalry Regiment; 8th Cavalry Regiment; U.S. Army Wasco Scouts	Unknown

Casualties and losses
- Total casualties: ~1762

The Snake War (1864–1868) was an irregular war fought by the United States of America against the "Snake Indians," the settlers' term for Northern Paiute, Bannock and Western Shoshone bands who lived along the Snake River. Fighting took place in the states of Oregon, Nevada, and California, and in Idaho Territory. Total casualties from both sides of the conflict numbered 1,762 dead, wounded, or captured.

== Background ==
The conflict was a result of increasing tension over several years between the Native tribes and the settlers who were encroaching on their lands, and competing for game and water. Explorers passing through had minimal effect. In October 1851, Shoshone Indians killed eight men in Fort Hall Idaho. From the time of the Clark Massacre, in 1851 the regional Native Americans, commonly called the "Snakes" by the white settlers, harassed and sometimes attacked emigrant parties crossing the Snake River Valley. European-American settlers retaliated by attacking Native American villages. In September 1852, Ben Wright and a group of miners responded to an Indian attack by attacking the Modoc village near Black Bluff in Oregon, killing about 41 Modoc. Similar attacks and retaliations took place in the years leading up to the Snake War.

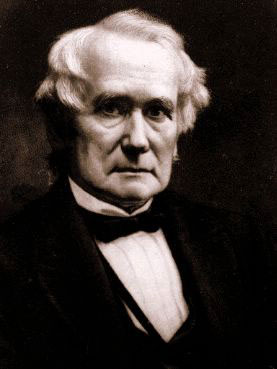
This is the image of Henry Charles Carey the historian that is quoted in the article.

In August 1854, Native attacks on several pioneer trains along the Snake River culminated in the Ward Massacre on August 20, 1854, in which Native Americans killed 21 people. The following year, the US Army mounted the punitive Winnas Expedition. From 1858 at the end of the Spokane-Coeur d'Alene-Paloos War, the US Army protected the migration to Oregon by sending out escorts each spring. Natives continued to attack migrant trains, especially stragglers such as the Myers party, killed in the Salmon Falls Massacre of September 13, 1860. This Massacre lead to the capture of death of 29 emigrants. One historian Henry Charles Carey described the attack as "more atrocious than any that had preceded it". As Federal troops withdrew in 1861 to return east for engagements of the American Civil War, California Volunteers provided protection to the emigrants. Later the 1st Washington Territory Infantry Regiment and the 1st Oregon Cavalry replaced Army escorts on the emigrant trails.

This is a picture that shows where the Nez Perce Reservation is located in Idaho.

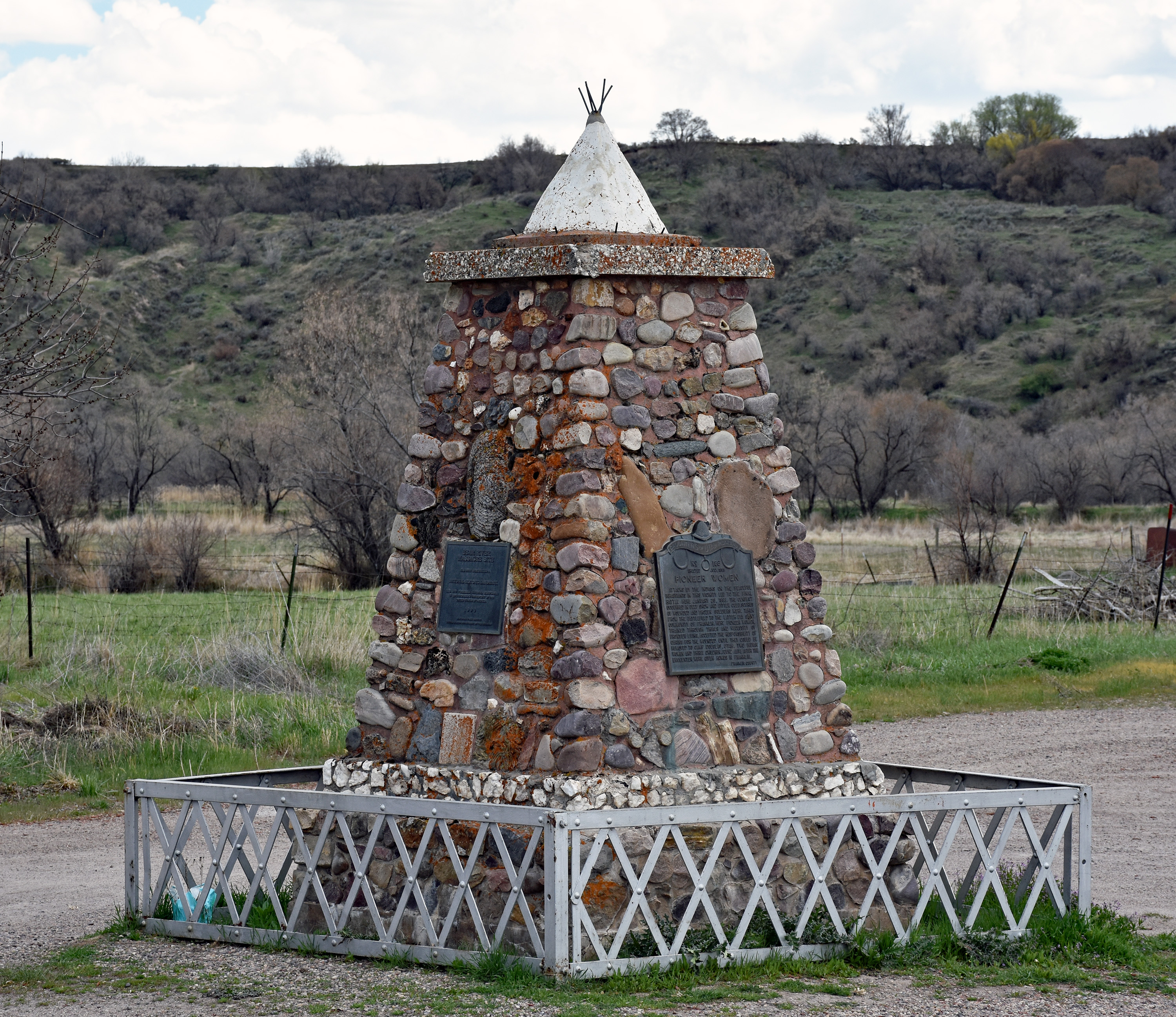
This is a monument to the lives lost during the Bear River Massacre, it is located near Preston, Idaho.

As gold mining declined in California in the later 1850s, miners searching for gold started to move north and eastward into the upper Great Basin, and Snake River valley, thus they competed more for resources with the Native Americans. They lived on the land longer and consumed more game and water. Many isolated occurrences resulted in violence, with the result that both sides were taking to arms. The influx of miners into the Nez Perce reservation during the Clearwater Gold Rush raised tensions among all the tribes. The Nez Perce were divided when some chiefs agreed to a new treaty that permitted the intrusion. As miners developed new locations near Boise in 1862 and in the Owyhee Canyonlands in 1863, an influx of white settlers descended on the area. In January 1863 there was the most deadly massacre of Indians in American history, the Bear River Massacre, over 250 men women and children were killed. Today near Preston, Idaho there is a monument to the lives lost during this massacre, and in 1990 the site was declared a National Historic Landmark. Western Shoshone, Paiute and other local Indians resisted the encroachment, fighting what was called the Snake War from 1864 to 1868.

== Bear River Massacre ==
At daybreak on January 29, 1863, Colonel Patrick Edward Connor led approximately 200 Union volunteer soldiers in an assault on a village inhabited by around 500 Shoshone individuals, encompassing men, women, and children. In response to previous assaults on the United States Postal Service, the soldiers proceeded to pillage the village, resulting in the killing of numerous Shoshone individuals and the assault of several women, both deceased and living. The Union soldiers suffered approximately 25 casualties, while the Shoshone losses amounted to over 250 individuals, including Chief Bear Hunter. This violent event is remembered as the Bear River Massacre or the Massacre at Boa Ogoi and is regarded as one of the most devastating episodes of Native American massacre in the history of the American West.

== Bear River Massacre Memorial ==
The battleground lies a few miles northwest of Preston, marked by Bear River and Battle Creek (then Beaver Creek), both pivotal features during the clash between the United States Army's California Volunteers and the Northwestern Band of the Shoshone Nation.

The topography encompasses Bear River and the meadows lining its banks, with Battle Creek flowing north–south, partially channeled by US Route 91. Above this channeled area, the creek emerges from a southwest–northeast escarpment. The Shoshone village, about 70 lodges on either side of Battle Creek, sat below this escarpment, using the ravine created by the creek as a natural defense during the conflict. The ravine became a significant battleground, offering protection for defending Shoshone warriors and shelter for unarmed Natives seeking refuge.

Many Native individuals attempting to escape were shot, some even while trying to cross Bear River. The aftermath saw the California Volunteers retrieving their fallen comrades but leaving the deceased Shoshone where they fell.

In subsequent years, the Northwestern Band of the Shoshone Nation acquired parts of the site and announced plans to erect a memorial at the burial site. Additional efforts included the purchase of approximately 600 more acres in 2018, with intentions to develop a cultural interpretive center and memorial, honoring the heritage and history of the Shoshone people at the tragic site of the Bear River Massacre.

== About the war ==
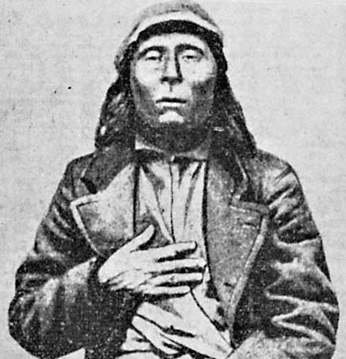
This is an image of Chief Paulina.

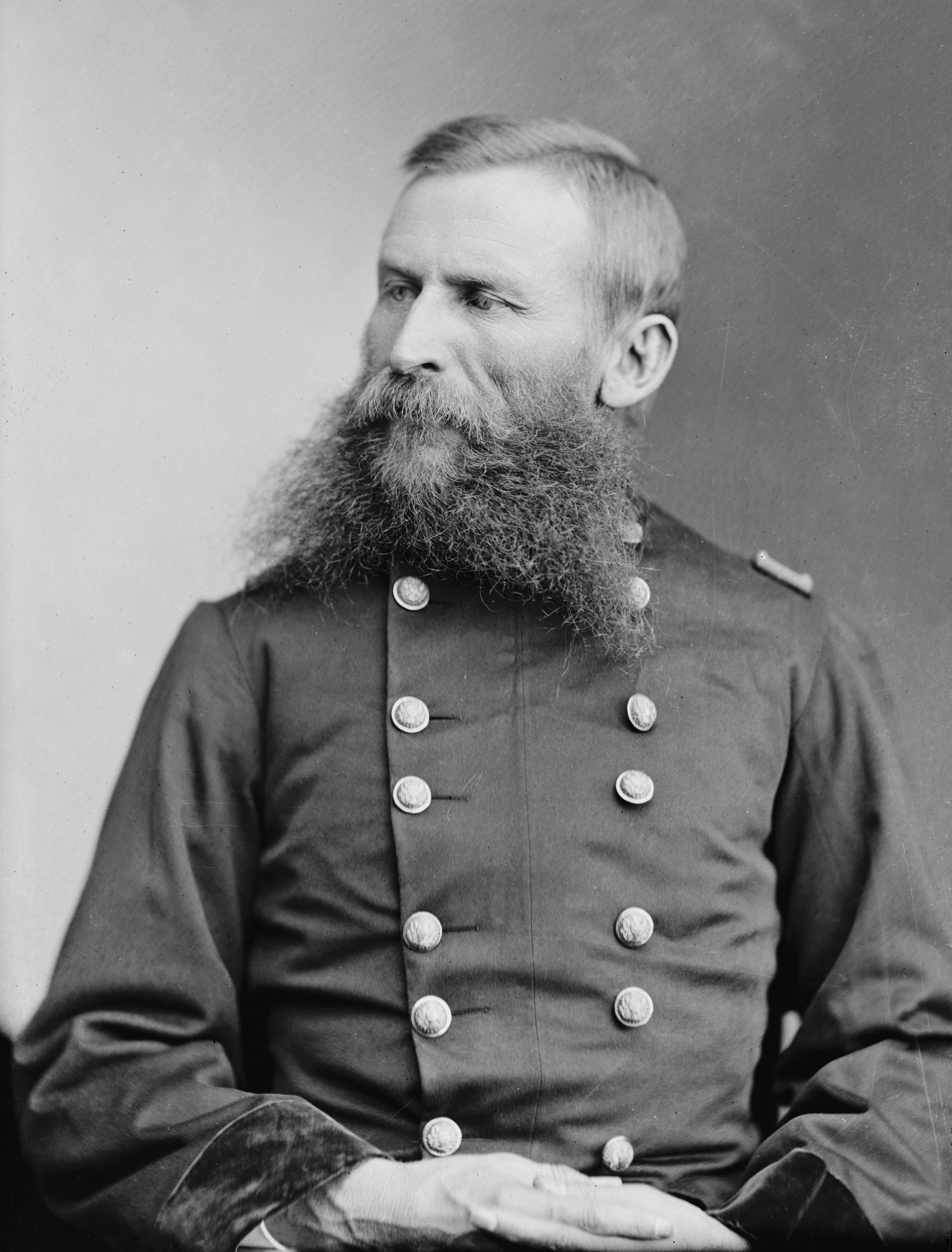
This is an image of the US Colonel George Crook who was a part of the Bear River Massacre.

The Snake War was not defined by one large battle but was a series of guerrilla skirmishes between the Indians and American patrols from many small camps, taking place across California, Utah, Nevada, Oregon, and Idaho. Unlike other Indian Wars, the Snake War had few notable leaders on either side. Probably the best-known Indian leader was Pahninee aka Chief Paulina and the most well-known U.S. Army commander of the Snake War was George Crook. He had played a significant role for the Union in the Civil War and following his success in ending the Snake War, would lead operations in the Apache Wars. Many of the U.S. troops fighting in the beginning of the war were volunteer regiments from the states of Oregon and California and from Washington Territory. The regular US Army called the period of their involvement in the Snake War, the Campaign against Indians, Oregon, Idaho, and California (1865–1868).

== Battle of Owyhee River ==
In 1866, amidst the Snake War, the Battle of Owyhee River occurred following Paiute assaults along the Owyhee River earlier in the same year. At daybreak on December 26, Crook's forces surprised the sleeping Paiutes at their camp. Once the initial shots rang out, Chief Howluck decided to stand his ground and engage in battle. The indigenous warriors mocked the soldiers, but faced a precise and lethal retaliation. In the swift exchange, nearly all of the mounted warriors were swiftly incapacitated by gunfire. The remaining few sought shelter behind rocks and remained there until noon when they eventually withdrew. Crook had caused considerable damage to Howluck's warriors. 30 were killed and another 7 captured. Crook lost 1 man wounded and another mortally wounded. Crook commented the battle "...ended any more depredations from that band".

== Conclusion ==
The Snake War wound down after peace talks between George Crook and Snake chief Weahwewa had taken place. The Snake War has been widely forgotten in United States history. One reason was that the Paiute and Western Shoshone did not have notable reputations as warriors, unlike the Apache. Few reporters covered the war, and Joe Wasson was one of the first. More significantly, much of the nation was concentrating on the American Civil War and its aftermath. Despite its being overlooked, the Snake War was statistically the deadliest of the Indian Wars in the West in terms of casualties.

By the end, a total of 1,762 men were known to have been killed, wounded, and captured on both sides. By comparison, the Battle of the Little Bighorn produced about 847 casualties.

=== Snake War Posts: California, Idaho, Nevada, Oregon ===
- Fort Dalles, Oregon (1850–1867)
- Fort Churchill, Nevada (1860–1869)
- Camp Nye, Nevada (1861–1865)
- Fort Ruby, Nevada (1862–1869)
- Camp Smoke Creek, Nevada (1862–1864)
- Camp Dun Glen, Nevada (1863, 1865–1866)
- Fort Trinity, Eightmile, Nevada (1863–1864)
- Fort Klamath, Oregon (1863–1890)
- Fort Boise, Boise, Idaho (1863–1879)
- Camp Susan, Susanville, California (1864)
- Post at Friday's Station (1864)
- Camp Bidwell, California (1865–1879) (Later Fort Bidwell)
- Antelope Station, Nevada (1864)
- Camp Alvord, Oregon (1864–1866)
- Camp Dalgren, Oregon (1864)
- Camp Henderson, Oregon (1864–1866)
- Camp Lincoln, Oregon 1864
- Camp Maury, Oregon (1864)
- Camp Russell, Oregon (1864–1865)
- Camp Watson, Oregon (1864–1869)
- Samuel Smith's Camp, Idaho (1864), near the mouth of the Raft River.
- Quinn River Camp, Nevada (1865)
  - Fort McDermitt, Nevada (1865–1889)
- Camp McGarry, Nevada (1865–1868)
- Camp McKee, Nevada (1865–1866)
- Camp Overend, Nevada (1865)
- Camp Reed, Idaho (1865–1866), near Twin Falls on old Kelton Road near its crossing of Rock Creek.
- Camp Wallace or Cantonment Soldier, Idaho (1865), located on the Big Camas Prairie near Fairfield, Idaho.
- Camp Lyon, Idaho (1865–1869), near Jordan Valley, Oregon on Jordan Creek within one mile of the Idaho state line.
- Camp Colfax, Oregon (1865–1867)
- Camp Currey, Oregon (1865–1866)
- Camp Logan, Oregon (1865–1868)
- Camp Polk, Oregon (1865–1866)
- Camp on Silvies River, Oregon (1864?)
- Camp Wright, Oregon (1865–1866)
- Camp Buford, Idaho (1866)
- Old Camp Warner, Oregon (1866–1867)
  - Camp Warner, Oregon (1867–1874)
- Camp Winthrop, September 26, 1866 – April 1867
  - Camp Three Forks, April, 1867 – October 23, 1871

== Sources ==
- The Snake War, 1864-1868, Idaho State Historical Society Reference Series #236, 1966
- Hubert Howe Bancroft, Mrs. Frances Auretta Fuller Barrett Victor, HISTORY OF OREGON, Vol. II. 1848-1888, The History Company, San Francisco, 1888, Chapters XX MILITARY ORGANIZATION AND OPERATIONS 1861-1865 and XXI THE SHOSHONE WARS 1866–1868, pp. 488–654
- Michno, Gregory, The Deadliest Indian War in the West: The Snake Conflict, 1864-1868. Caldwell: Caxton Press, 2007.
- Wooster, Robert, The Military and United States Indian Policy 1865-1903, New Haven: Yale University Press, 1988.
- Hook, Jason, and Martin Pegler, To Live and Die in the West: The American Indian Wars, Chicago: Fitzroy Dearborn Publishers, 2001.
- Erik Peterson, Brigham Young University. “Colonel Patrick Edward Connor and the Bear River Massacre.” Intermountain Histories, www.intermountainhistories.org/items/show/24#:~:text=On%2029%20January%201863%20Colonel,the%20space%20of%20four%20hours. Accessed 9 Dec. 2023.
- Idaho State Historical Society Reference Series Battle of Three Forks ..., history.Idaho.gov/wp-content/uploads/0239.pdf. Accessed 11 Dec. 2023.
