= San Juan Island National Historical Park =

National Historical Park of the United States

- IUCN category V (protected landscape/seascape)
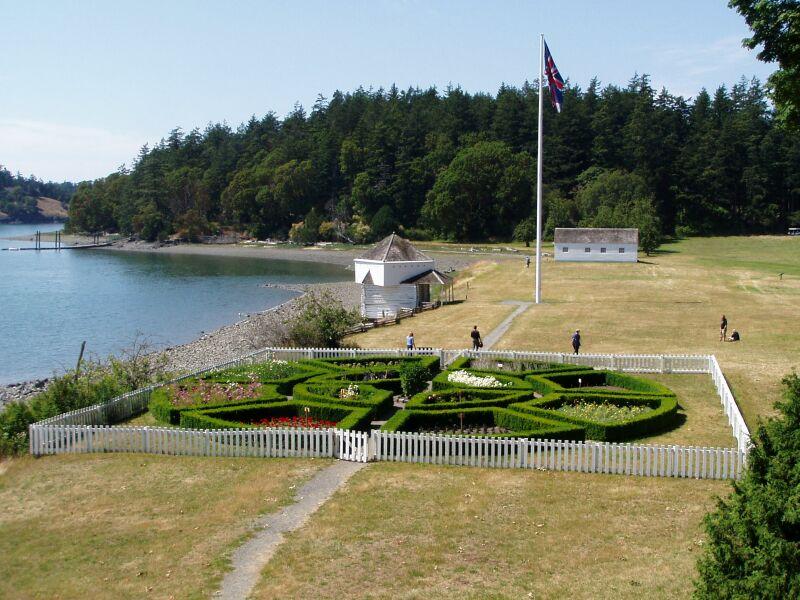
- British Camp

- Location within Washington (state) Location within the United States
- Location: San Juan County, Washington, US
- Nearest city: Friday Harbor, Washington
- Coordinates: 48°27′21″N 122°59′08″W
- Area: 2,141 acres (8.66 km^{2})
- Authorized: September 9, 1966
- Visitors: 420,922 (in 2025)
- Governing body: National Park Service
- Website: San Juan Island National Historical Park

U.S. National Historic Landmark District
- Designated: November 5, 1961

U.S. National Register of Historic Places
- Designated: October 15, 1966

San Juan Island National Historical Park, also known as American and English Camps, San Juan Island, is a US National Historical Park owned and operated by the National Park Service on San Juan Island in the state of Washington. The park is made up of the sites of the British and U.S. Army camps during the Pig War, a boundary dispute over the ownership of the island. The camp sites were designated a National Historic Landmark in 1961, and listed on the National Register of Historic Places in 1966. The park was created by an act of Congress in 1966 and expanded slightly in 2013.

== Original settlement ==
San Juan Island is located in the Salish Sea and is the westernmost of the main San Juan Islands. This island group is separated from Vancouver Island in British Columbia by the Haro Strait, and from the Washington mainland by the Rosario Strait.

The islands were first settled roughly 11,000 years ago when the continental ice shelf began to recede at the end of the Last Glacial Period. These original inhabitants were ancestors of six central Coast Salish tribes. Archeological evidence suggests hunting and gathering on the islands between 6,000 and 8,000 years ago, and shell middens found in both English and American Camp areas indicate there were thriving villages before the arrival of Europeans. Because of the harsh winter weather off the Strait of Juan de Fuca, it's likely that the American Camp area only hosted seasonal encampments for fishing and food gathering, but the sheltered bay likely made the English Camp an ideal site for year-round settlement. An excavation by a team from the University of Washington's Burke Museum of Natural History and Culture established extensive evidence of various human uses of the area around the English Camp, but was inconclusive as to whether it was a site of year round settlement.

Exploration by Europeans brought smallpox to the area by the 1770s, devastating the local population. The Lummi Nation, among those Coast Salish tribes whose ancestors inhabited the islands, are engaged in efforts to re-start traditional uses of the English Camp area, including reef net fishing.

== Territorial disputes ==
The Haro and Rosario straits defined the competing territorial claims of the United States and Great Britain after the Oregon Treaty of 1846 settled most of the northwestern border. Both sides pursued their territorial claims, with Americans homesteading on San Juan Island, and the British Hudson's Bay Company establishing a farm on the southern tip of the island. In 1859, an American killed a stray British-owned pig, sparking the international dispute known as the Pig War. The American homesteaders requested military protection, resulting in the establishment of the American camp, while the British sent Royal Navy ships. Cooler heads prevailed, and an agreement was reached whereby both sides would maintain camps on the island until the dispute could be resolved through diplomacy. From 1860 to 1872, British Royal Marines occupied a camp on the northwestern part of the island. The American garrison included Henry Martyn Robert, author of Robert's Rules of Order.

The period of military occupation was peaceful; a road was built between the two camps, and Americans in the village of San Juan engaged in commerce with both encampments. As part of the 1871 Treaty of Washington, the two countries agreed that the matter of the islands would be arbitrated by the German Kaiser Wilhelm I. The following year he declared the boundary to be the Haro Strait, thus awarding the islands to the United States.

The British withdrew from their camp soon after, and the American camp was reduced in size and scope. The buildings and properties were sold as surplus or abandoned. The British camp was homesteaded in 1876 by William Crook, a farmer and carpenter, whose son built a house in the camp area in the early 20th century. The Crooks donated their property to the state beginning in the 1950s, and the state also acquired land around the American camp beginning in 1951. These properties formed the core of what became this park in 1966.

== English Camp ==
The English Camp site is on Garrison Bay on the island's northwestern shore. Today the Union Jack still flies there, being raised and lowered daily by park rangers, making it one of the very few places without diplomatic status where US government employees regularly hoist the flag of another country. Surviving buildings from the British occupation include a commissary, barracks, blockhouse, and hospital; the latter building was one that was sold and moved from the site, but was later acquired by the park and returned.

== American Camp ==
The American Camp site is on the island's southernmost peninsula, and partially overlaps the original Hudson's Bay Company farm. The park property also includes the original site of San Juan village on the north shore of the peninsula, which was abandoned after the dispute ended and was entirely burned in 1890. The camp site includes three surviving buildings from the American military occupation: two officers' quarters, and the house and working quarters of the camp laundress.

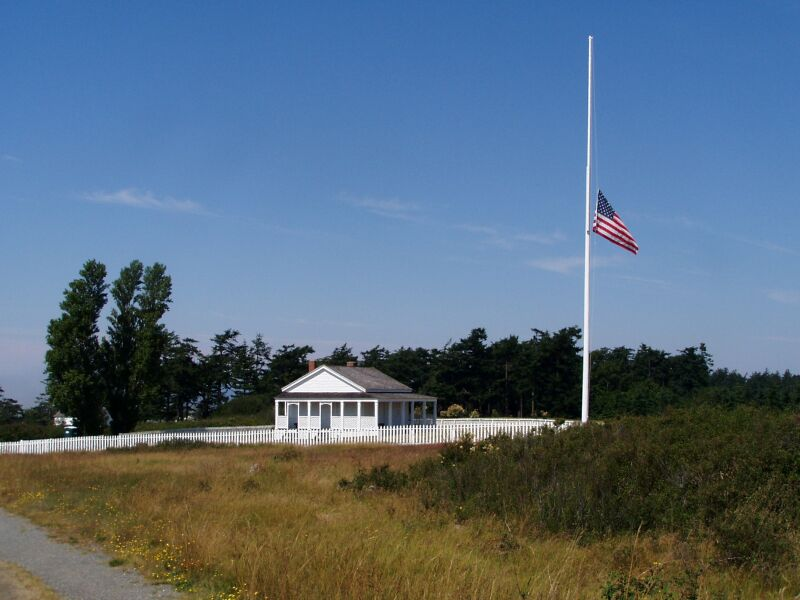
American Camp

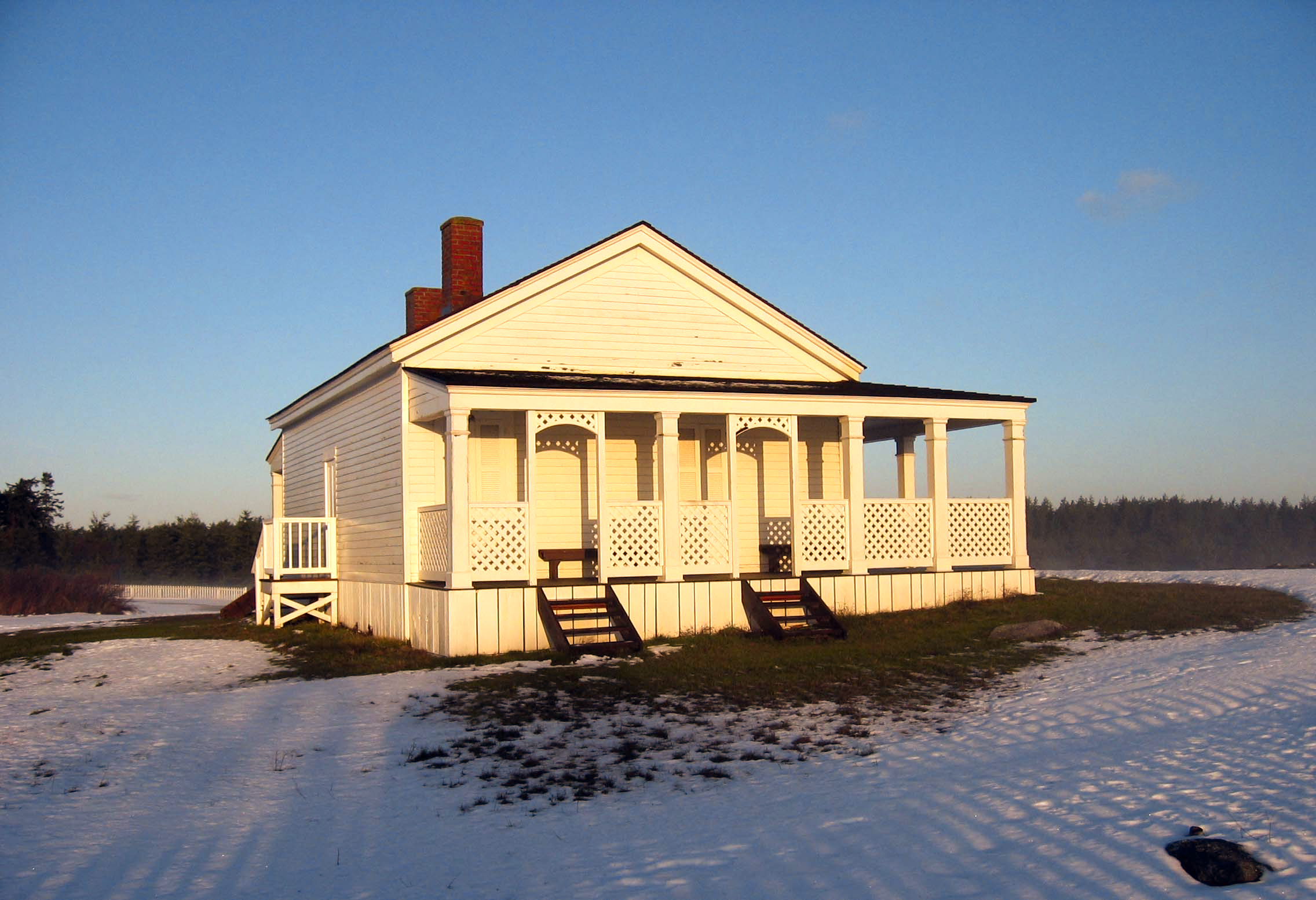
Officer's Quarters

== Recreation ==
The park encompasses 2,146 acres, divided between two sites American Camp on the south end of San Juan Island and English Camp on northwest side of the island. Entry to both areas is free, and both include visitor centers. American Camp has three mapped hiking trails, including one to the summit of Mount Finlayson. English Camp includes the Bell Point Trail, Young Hill Trail and Mitchell Hill Trail Network. American Camp includes South Beach on the Strait of Juan De Fuca, with views of the Olympic Mountains, and 4 July Beach on Griffin Bay. Both English and American Camps have kayak launches.

== Wildlife ==
The American Camp prairie is home to the world's only viable population of the island marble butterfly (Euchloe ausonides insulana). The butterfly was thought to be extinct for 90 years before being rediscovered in 1998, and was listed as endangered in 2020. Bird species commonly spotted at American Camp include bald eagle, Harrier (bird), Harlequin duck, American goldfinch, Great horned owl and Osprey. Foxes are commonly spotted, especially on the American Camp prairie, where they prey on rabbits. Orcas and humpback and gray whales can be spotted on occasion from both parks.
