= Winnemucca =

Winnemucca can refer to:

== Places ==
- Winnemucca, Nevada
- Winnemucca Indian Colony, a reservation in Nevada
- Winnemucca Lake, a dry lake bed in Nevada

== Tribes ==
- Winnemucca Indian Colony of Nevada, a federally recognized Northern Paiute and Western Shoshone tribe

== People ==
- Poito, also known as Chief Winnemucca, a chief of the Northern Paiute.
- Numaga, also known as Young Winnemucca, a war chief of the Northern Paiute and Poito's nephew.
- Poito's daughter, Sarah Winnemucca, activist, educator, and advocate for the Northern Paiute.
- Truckee, also known as Old Winnemucca, a chief of the Northern Paiute. Truckee was Poito's father-in-law.
