= Wahweveh =

Wahweveh (Black Eagle) was a leader of the Oregon Walpapi Paiute (related to the Shoshone). He was head war chief in the final phase of the Shoshoni Rebellion, known to Americans as the Sheepeater War of 1879.

== Background ==
Little is known of Wahweveh's early life. His full siblings were Chief Paulina, Bright Eyes, and Puna (Cactus Fruit). His half-brother was Weahwewa (Wolf Dog).

== Military service ==
On June 7, 1878, during the leadup to what became known as the Bannock War, Malheur Reservation Indian agent William V. Rinehart reported to the Commissioner of Indian Affairs that Wahweveh, with 55 braves, had picked up supplies and was heading east. On Saturday, June 22, 1878, Black Eagle rescued the severely injured Pony Blanket (Egan) from the battlefield—saving his life, but signaling the end of Egan's tenure as war chief. By July, news of a new Tukadika (Mountain Sheep Eater) Snake outbreak in Idaho drew Wahweveh and his Hunipui (Bear Killer) Snake dog-soldiers onto the battlefront. On their way, on July 4 Black Eagle and his warriors attacked four heavily laden supply wagons at La Grande on their way to Pendleton. They destroyed the wagons, killed and mutilated their drivers, and scattered the freight.

On August 13, 1878, more than 60 warriors rode into the Malheur Indian Agency and were arrested after they surrendered to American troops. Among the warriors were Cheegibah (Leggins), son of Natchez (Boy) and grandson of Chief Winnemucca the Younger; Otiz (Left Hand), grandson of Owitze (Twisted Hand) and Ochiho (Red Willow), son of Chochoco (Has No Horse). Under intense interrogation, Leggins identified the ranking war chiefs: Oytes (Left Hand), Bannock Joe Pohave (Racehorse), Captain Bearskin (Honalelo (Little Bearskin Dick)), Big John Ponce (Three Coyotes), Eagle Eye Wahweveh (Black Eagle), Charley Chongyo (Pipe), D.E. Johnson, Beads, and Surger Wahi (Fox). Most of the leaders whom Leggins named were shot in 1878. Lieutenant Colonel James Forsyth reported that his troops had killed Wahweveh (Black Eagle) on July 31, 1878; however, in spring 1879 Wahweveh and medicine chief Tamanmo (Black Spirit), with a few Snake dog soldiers, raided a mining camp on the Oregon-Idaho border and killed several Chinese laborers. American troops under several leaders responded with a series of battles which became known as the Sheepeater War.

== Death ==
Black Eagle was killed in late August 1879 on the south fork of the Salmon River.
