= Winnemucca (Paiute leader) =

Native American Northern Paiute war chief (c. 1820–1882)

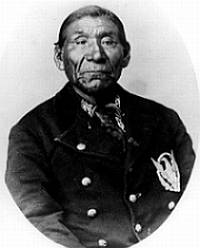
- Born: c. 1820
- Died: 1882
- Other names: Wobitsawahkah, Mubetawaka, and Poito
- Organization(s): Tribe: Kuyuidika band, Northern Paiute (born a Shoshone)
- Known for: Northern Paiute war chief
- Spouse(s): Tuboitonie, Old Winnemucca's daughter
- Children: Sarah Winnemucca, Natchez Winnemucca, Frank Winnemucca, Mary Winnemucca, and others
- Relatives: Numaga (son or nephew)

Winnemucca (c. 1820 – 1882) (also called Wobitsawahkah, Bad Face, Winnemucca the Younger, Mubetawaka, and Poito) was a Northern Paiute war chief. He was born in Shoshone around 1820 in what would later become the Oregon Territory.

When he married the daughter of Old Winnemucca, he became a Paiute according to their tribal rules. They were of the Kuyuidika band of the Northern Paiute. His father-in-law honored him by naming him "Winnemucca the Younger". The name means "The Giver of Spiritual Gifts." Winnemucca the Younger became a war chief with the Kuyuidika.

== Political life ==
Winnemucca the Younger (his alternative name "Bad Face" will be used in the remainder of this article) eventually became war chief of the Kuyuidika. He distrusted white settlers more than did his father-in-law.

Trying to define his role in Northern Paiute politics has been an area of controversy for historians. He is primarily known through the writings of his daughter, Sarah Winnemucca. She downplayed his Shoshone roots and connections to distinguish her father and her people as peaceful and to protect them from the prejudice many settlers held against the more warlike Shoshone, also called "Snake Indians". She exaggerated his influence over the Paiute people, saying that he was the principal chief of all the Paiute tribes. Since she served as an interpreter in the area, her viewpoint was adopted by many contemporary Oregonians. Modern historians and ethnologists view Winnemucca more as a "first among equals", with considerable influence over the bands in the Pyramid Lake region.

He was a leading proponent of the Pyramid Lake War of 1860. At the time of the formation of the Paviotso Confederacy at the Ochoco Council of 1851, the Paiute were more allied with his father-in-law, (Old) Chief One Moccasin's plea to keep the peace. The Paiute did not then join the Shoshone and Northern Ute warriors in the war effort. Later, Bad Face led several Paiute units in warfare, and they were mistakenly identified as Snake warriors.

At 3:00 am on March 17, 1865, while Sarah Winnemucca and her grandfather, Old Winnemucca were in Dayton, Nevada, Captain Almond D. Wells' Nevada Volunteer cavalrymen raided their family camp on the shore of what is now known as Winnemucca Lake. The cavalry killed 29 of the 30 old men, women and children in the camp, including two of Old Winnemucca's wives. Bad Face's wife and a daughter were shot, sustaining mortal wounds. His baby son was killed by being thrown into a fire. In 1868 Bad Face surrendered. After that war, his influence decreased considerably. He had little control over events at the Malheur Reservation leading to the Bannock War of 1878.

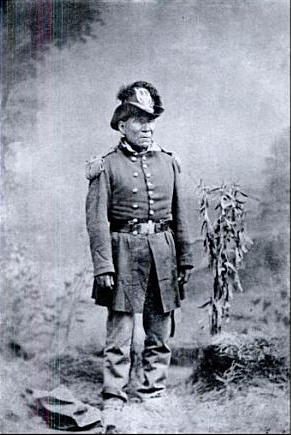
Winnemucca the Younger dressed in an army uniform.

During the winter of 1872–1873, Bad Face refused to settle on a farm at the Malheur Reservation, despite his daughter Sarah's asking him to join her. He said he might starve there. He took refuge at the base of Steens Mountain, near the Reuben and Dolly Kiger Ranch in what is now Harney County, Oregon. By 1873, settlers and the government in Oregon worried that the Paiute under Bad Face might join with the Shoshone under Chochoco (Has No Horse). They also worried about potential collaboration of the tribe with former enemies, the Modoc people, being led by John Schonchin and Captain Jack (Modicus), in what became the Modoc War. On April 11, 1873, the Modoc War ended.

By 1874, Winnemucca, Sarah and another daughter, and eight warriors were appearing at Metropolitan Theater in Sacramento, California in a series of skits on Indian life, which they performed for five years. While the agency was led by the US Indian agent Samuel Parrish, in 1875, Bad Face went to and from the Malheur Reservation with considerable freedom.

Parrish built irrigation canals and a school for the reservation. He had expanded the reservation to secure better farmland for the Shoshone, although he had no permission. He annexed Pony Blanket's cultivated land and the Shoshone's traditional hot springs. This caused conflict with powerful local settlers who wanted that land; they included the ranchers Henry Miller and Pete French. They started what was a successful campaign to have Parrish replaced.

In early April 1875, Bad Face, Sarah Winnemucca, and Pony Blanket attempted to persuade officers at Fort Harney to help reinstate Parrish. William V. Rinehart and other wealthy opponents retaliated by falsely accusing officers at Fort Harney, Fort McDermitt, and Fort Bidwell of supplying food to Shoshone who refused to stay on the Malheur Reservation, and thus helping them stay away. Rinehart was the sworn enemy of both the Shoshoni and Paiute, preferring absolute authority and extermination of indigenous people, where possible. Parrish was replaced by Rinehart on June 28, 1876, just three days after George Armstrong Custer's fall at Little Bighorn. He began defrauding and abusing both reservation and non-reservation native people, often not giving them adequate supplies of rations.

Northeastern Oregon settlers prevailed upon the Congress to overturn President Ulysses S. Grant's pact to let the Nez Perce stay in Wallowa. On June 13, 1877 Chief Joseph went on the warpath. After refusing to move 500 of his people from their high mountain meadow in the Wallowa Valley to the Fort Hall Reservation in Idaho, he killed four white men. (The reservation was to have included Camas Prairie, but due to a clerical error, did not.) The Paiute, who had been leaving the Malheur Reservation to escape Rinehart and starvation, returned en masse, knowing they would be safer at the reservation during wartime.

Bad Face and some of his warriors traveled to Boise City, where they dined as guests of honor with Governor Mason Brayman; they assured him of their peaceful intent. Still, neither would go onto the Malheur Reservation as Rinehart insisted and conditions continued to worsen. Two Shoshone "Dog Soldiers" came to the Malheur Reservation in March 1878 and threatened war as soon as there was grass. Brayman wrote to US Senator W. J. McConnell on their behalf, agreeing that the Shoshoni Banattee Snakes at Fort Hall Reservation had "ample justification" for the methods they pursued, given the ongoing loss of their natural food supply, Camas root, to the settlers' hogs.

On June 16, 1878, the Salt Lake City Tribune reported that Laughing Hawk (Tambiago), imprisoned at the Idaho Territorial Penitentiary, had informed officials that Buffalo Horn (Kotsotiala) was to meet with Bad Face and Has No Horse in the "Juniper Mountains". The officials ignored his warning. On May 27, 1878, after holding a council of war, the Shoshone started an uprising in eastern Oregon with the killing of James Dempsey, a white gun dealer who lived in Harney Valley. with a Shoshoni wife. He had purchased arms in October 1877 from the Mormons at Salt Lake City and sold the weapons to the Bannock/Bannatte Robber Snakes, after having urged them for a year to go to war. He then informed Idaho Governor Brayman that war was eminent. The uprising turned into the second Shoshone War, which the Americans called the Bannock War.

On June 5, Sarah Winnemucca met with Pony Blanket (Egan), Left Hand, Dancer, and Three Coyotes at the Malheur Indian Agency and learned that the Snake Indians were being starved out of the Malheur reservation, that they could not buy clothes, and that Paiute horses were being shot. Three Coyotes reported the rape of an Indian girl and the confiscation of weapons and horses at the Fort Hall Reservation. They gathered money to send Sarah to Washington to tell President Rutherford B. Hayes of these problems. She left on June 9, 1878. That day Captain Reuben F. Bernard caught up with Black Buffalo and Old Bull near the Oregon-Idaho border, after having his men pull down telegraph lines to shut off the war zone communications. He seriously wounded both men. Before the last of the lines were pulled down, General Irvin McDowell got a message through to Bad Face and his son Natchez, asking them to come and help keep the peace with the hostile Snake at the Malheur Reservation. They consented but planned to join the Snakes at war. On June 10, 1878, Congress declared war on the Western Shoshoni Nation.

Bad Face died in October 1882 at Coppersmith ranch in Surprise Valley, Modoc County. One source states that he was poisoned.

== Legacy ==
Winnemucca Indian Colony of Nevada, Winnemucca Lake, Winnemucca Mountain, and the city of Winnemucca, Nevada are named after Winnemucca. His eldest son Natchez and nephew Numaga were known to whites as Little Winnemucca and Young Winnemucca, respectively.

As of 1970, one source claimed that descendants of Chief Winnemucca could be found among the residents of the Pyramid Lake Reservation.

== See also ==
- Battle of Mud Lake
- Native American history of Nevada
