= Winnemucca Indian Colony of Nevada =

Winnemucca Indian Colony Dosawii
- Indian reservation
- Location of the Winnemucca Indian Colony in Nevada
- Country: United States
- State: Nevada
- County: Humboldt

The Winnemucca Indian Colony of Nevada (Shoshoni: Newe Sogobi' Tdos-a-wee or dosawii) is a federally recognized tribe of Western Shoshone and Northern Paiute Indians in northwestern Nevada.

== Reservation ==
The Winnemucca Indian Colony of Nevada has a reservation at 40°57′58″N 117°43′41″W in Humboldt County, Nevada. The reservation was established on June 18, 1917, and comprises two parcels of land, 20 acres (0.081 km^{2}) enclosed within the urban area of the City of Winnemucca centered on Cinnabar Street, and 320 acres (1.3 km^{2}) of rural land on the southern edge of the city west of Water Canyon Road. In 1990, 17 tribal members lived on the reservation. In 2022, a court filing reported that the colony consisted of 28 tribal members.

== Recent history ==
In 2007, the Winnemucca Indian Colony joined non-Natives from Utah in suing the United States to prevent the detonation of 700 short tons (640 t) of explosives at the Nevada Test Site, which is on ancestral Western Shoshone lands. In the 1940s, members of the tribe had been forcibly removed from their lands, which were taken over by the Nevada Test Site, where nuclear bombs were tested from 1951 to 1993. The tribe considers the removal and subsequent nuclear weapons testing on their lands as a violation of the 1863 Western Shoshone Treaty of Ruby Valley. The test, called Divine Strake, was eventually cancelled.

The Committee on the Elimination of Racial Discrimination of the United Nations High Commission on Human Rights ruled on March 10, 2006, that the lands belonged to the Winnemucca Indian Colony and other Western Shoshone tribes.

== Today ==
The Winnemucca Indian Colony of Nevada's tribal headquarters is located in Winnemucca, Nevada. William Bills is the CEO/President recognized by the federal Bureau of Indian Affairs. The tribe is governed by a five-person tribal council.

== Notable Winnemucca ==
- Chief Winnemucca
- Sarah Winnemucca, she published the first autobiography by a Native American woman, Life Among the Piutes: Their Wrongs and Claims (1883), considered "one of the most enduring ethno-historical books written by an American Indian."
