= Samuel B. Parrish =

American Indian Agent (1838–1897)

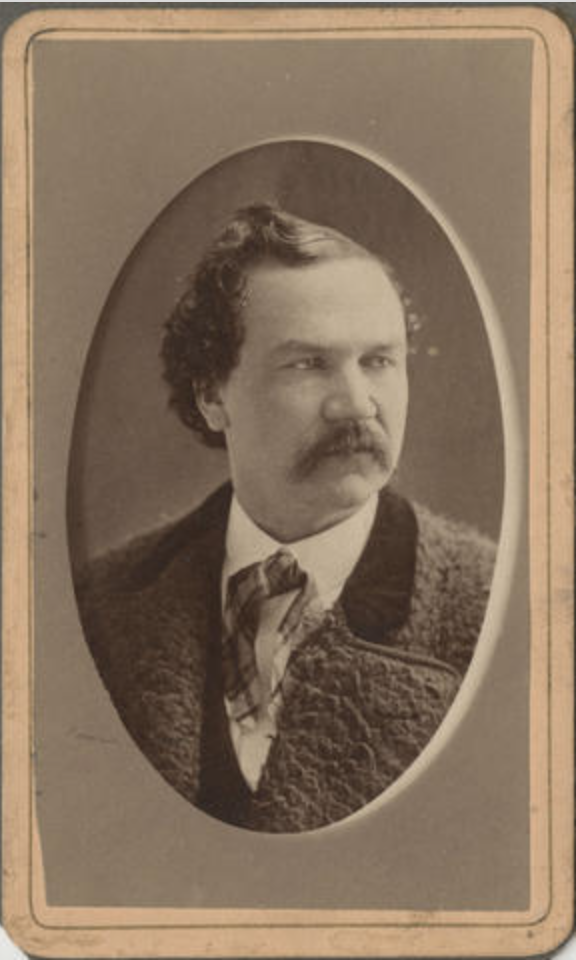
- Born: February 25, 1838; Pike, New York
- Died: July 12, 1897 (aged 59); Portland, Oregon
- Resting place: River View Cemetery
- Occupations: U.S. Indian Agent; Portland Chief of Police

Samuel B. Parrish (February 25, 1838 – July 12, 1897) was an American Indian Agent and Portland Police Chief. He lived at Cardwell–Parrish House, listed on the National Register of Historic Places since 1991.

As a young man, Parrish worked as a government express employee for the Bureau of Indian Affairs, was a cowboy, and worked for the custom house. Parrish was indicted but not convicted of transporting liquor between Portland and Victoria, British Columbia in 1866 and 1867 without paying the duties.

He worked for Indian Affairs during the Modoc Wars, was instrumental in establishing the Malheur Indian Reservation, and was an Indian Agent there. With Sarah Winnemucca, Parrish introduced agricultural methods for effective farming and helped establish and operate a school for children and young adults. Some white people in the area were not happy with the job he was doing and had him fired after about a year and a half.

Parrish worked as assistant manager of the Monumental Mining Company in Grant County, Oregon, for about four years. He then worked at the Portland Police Department in customs and, beginning in 1884, as the city's chief of police, a position he held for eight years.

== Early life and parents ==
Samuel Ball Parrish, born February 25, 1838, in Pike, Allegany County, New York, was the son of Elizabeth (née Winn) and Rev. Josiah L. Parrish. (Note: Hines stated that Parrish was born in Allegany County, New York. Pike was previously part of Allegany County.) Parrish had an older brother Lamberson (who died in 1840), older brother Norman, and a younger brother Charles. (Note: The 1850 census just had Josiah, Norman, Samuel, and Charles. No wife was listed.)

Starting as a harness maker and blacksmith, Josiah became a missionary for the Methodist Episcopal Missionary Society. The family sailed for eight months around Cape Horn in 1840 from New York to the mouth of Columbia River of the Oregon Territory. They traveled with the Alvin F. Waller party on the ship and then to Rev. Jason Lee's mission near Salem. Parrish's father was a teacher, missionary, and when needed, a blacksmith. Josiah co-founded and served as president of Oregon Institute, now known as Willamette University. Parrish was educated at Oregon Institute and lived with his parents until 1857. In 1858, Josiah opened a small book and stationery store, J. L. Parrish & Company, in Portland. Parrish worked in the bookstore in his youth.

Parrish had two stepmothers. Josiah was married a second time to Jennie Lichtenthaler, and they had two daughters, Grace and Josie. Jennie died in 1887. In 1888, Josiah married Mrs. M. A. Pierce, the widow of early pioneer J. O. Pierce, who had a child from that marriage.

== Career ==
=== Early career ===
During the Rogue River Wars, also called the Indian War of 1855-1856, Parrish carried the government express through the Willamette Valley for the superintendent of the Bureau of Indian Affairs. In 1857, he engaged in the cattle business, driving from Oregon to British Columbia and the Eraser River mines, and continued in that occupation about two years. Parrish was a merchant, living with George Stratton and his small family in Portland, in 1860. In 1863, Parrish became connected with the railroad interests in Oregon, first being associated with S. G. Elliott, and later with Ben Holliday. He identified himself as a retired merchant in 1870 when he lived in Portland with two women. From 1870 to January 1873, Parrish held the office of Inspector of Customs.

=== Legal case ===
Parrish—with Asa Mercer, a deputy collector for the custom house; George A. Ladd, a delivery man; and H. W. Rappeleye, who prepared the fraudulent paperwork—were deemed by prosecutors to have transported liquor between Victoria, British Columbia and Portland without paying duties. Brandy was conveyed in December 1866 to Portland. In January 1867, Irish whiskey and wine were sent from Portland to Victoria. Mercer approved the paperwork. Parrish was believed to have been the ring leader. A grand jury convened before the arrests made in May 1867. They were released after posting bond, with bail set at $3,000 (equivalent to $67,493 in 2024) for Parrish and $2,000 each for Ladd and Rappeleye. A grand jury indicted Mercer, Parrish, Ladd, and Rappeleye. The prosecutors tried the case three times, plagued by witnesses who would not testify, defendants not showing up to court due to illness or otherwise absent, and very limited press coverage. Charges against Parrish were dropped, and the jury was deadlocked on Mercer's case. The U.S. Attorney's office dropped the case against Mercer.

=== Indian agent ===
Appointed Commissioner, under T. B. Odenale, superintendent of Indian Affairs, Parrish went into eastern Oregon to preserve the neutrality of the Northern Paiute and Snake Indians during the Modoc Wars. He was instrumental in establishing the Malheur reservation. (Note: Hines called the Native Americans "Piutos" and Snake Indians.)

Parrish then worked as an Indian Agent for the Malheur Indian Reservation, beginning April 18, 1874. (Note: Forbes said that he started in August 1874.) With Sarah Winnemucca, his Paiute-English interpreter, Parrish was able to help the Paiute to farm the land using irrigation. He taught at the school he built and Winnemucca established. Upon opening the school in October 1876, and with the leadership of Parrish's sister-in-law, they taught 374 children and 42 young men and women. Parrish distributed rations, during a time when Native Americans generally did not receive their promised supplies from the government. Author Michael Farquhar stated that Parrish "treated the Indians with kindness, encouraging them to work the land and to keep the rewards of their labor." White residents of Canyon City had Parrish removed from his position on April 25, 1876. They had also tried to obtain some of the reservation land. Parrish was replaced by William V. Rinehart, who reversed Parrish's plans and fired Winnemucca.

=== Mining ===
Parrish then engaged in mining in Grant County, Oregon, also served as assistant manager of the Monumental Mining Company, but in September 1880, returned to Portland to work for the police department.

=== Portland Police Department ===
The City Council of Portland appointed Parrish to the position of weigher and gauger for the Portland Police Department. He worked under N. F. Shurtleff, the collector of customs. After he was elected on April 23, 1884, Parrish served as chief of police for the city of Portland for eight years. (Note: The Oregon Historical Society states that his position as Chief of Police began in 1886.) During that time, he thoroughly reorganized the department. Parrish retired in August 1892. After Parish retired, he was sued by the City of Portland for holding money from city taxes that he was responsible for managing. Upon learning that Parrish had used his own money in December 1891 to pay police officers when there were insufficient funds in the city's account, the city attorney dropped the suit and settled. The last year of his life, Parrish served as bailiff for Judge H. E. McGinn at the Circuit Court.

=== German Remedy Company ===
In the fall of 1892, Parrish was interested in the German Remedy Company and the treatment of alcohol, morphine, and tobacco habits. With Captain J. T. Watson and John R. Duff, he purchased the agency for the State of Washington, and established their headquarters in Seattle on January 1, 1893. Used in Germany for over eighty years, the remedy was brought to America in 1870.

== Membership ==
While a businessman, Parrish was a member of the Portland's Stock and Exchange Board. Parrish was a member of the Oregon Pioneer Association and the Ancient Order of United Workmen (AOUW).

== Personal life ==
In 1885, Parrish married Adda, also known as Addie Crabb, daughter of pioneer John Crabb. They were married at Halsey, Linn County, Oregon. Parrish and his wife lived in a Queen Anne House along the Willamette River, now called the Cardwell–Parrish House, which has been listed on the National Register of Historic Places since 1991. They lived in the house beginning in 1891. The house was sold two months after Parrish died. Parrish died on July 12, 1897, in Portland, Oregon, and he is buried in River View Cemetery. His wife Adda died on October 7, 1911, age 54, in the state of Washington and was buried in Portland, Oregon.

== Bibliography ==
- Forbes, Jack D. (1967). Nevada Indians speak. Reno, Nevada: University of Nevada Press.
- Hines, Harvey K. (1893). "Samuel B. Parrish". An illustrated history of the state of Washington, containing biographical mention of its pioneers and prominent citizens. Chicago: The Lewis Publishing Company. pp. 890–891.
- Woods, Lawrence Milton (2002). Asa Shinn Mercer : western promoter and newspaperman. Spokane, Washington: Arthur H. Clark Company. ISBN 978-0-87062-315-8.
