= Egan (Paiute) =

Egan (died 1878) is the American name given to Pony Blanket. Pony Blanket was a Northern Paiute leader in the Oregon Country in the 19th century.

== Early life ==
Pony Blanket, known to Euro-American settlers as Egan, was born to a Cayuse family and did not know his birth mother. He married Evening Star, the sister of Chochoco (Has No Horse)'s first wife Dawn Mist, and was thus the brother-in-law of Has No Horse. With Evening Star he had at least two sons and a daughter.

In 1868, his lodge was at Fort Harney. Following the Snake War many of the Paiute had moved onto the Malheur Reservation in 1872, but white settlers began to take back land when they found gold and good grazing land there. Egan led a portion of his tribe and some Bannock people in fighting the white settlers in 1878.

== Great Shoshoni Uprising ==
On June 10, 1878, what became known as the Bannock War was declared, in response to the Great Shoshoni Uprising. On June 22, 1878, the first major U.S. military strike of the war began about two miles east of the present Crook County line. Major James Herron, on orders from General M. V. Brown, led fifty Oregon Volunteers into the Ochoco Mountains, where they joined with Colonel Orlando Robbins and his Idaho Militia troops, and with Civil War veteran Captain Reuben F. Bernard and his 250 U.S. cavalrymen. They planned to wait for General Oliver O. Howard's infantry to join them from a day's march to the south.

Colonel Robbins scouted ahead to assess the strength of assembled Shoshoni war parties in the Ochoco, which he estimated to be around two thousand strong with more than ten thousand horses. Captain Bernard broke camp at 2:00am, deciding not to wait for Howard's troops to arrive, and advanced on the Shoshoni encampment. Banattee medicine chief Honalelo (Bearskin), known to soldiers as 'Little Bearskin Dick,' rode out to meet the advance under a white flag of truce and was shot dead. The American contingent surged forward into the camp firing rifles and revolvers. During the battle, war chief Pony Blanket was severely wounded. He and Robbins met head to head and charged each other, weapons firing. The colonel was not injured but he hit Pony Blanket in the wrist and caused him to fall from his horse. Robbins then shot him with a .45 calibre in the chest and again in the right groin and captured Pony Blanket's buckskin war horse. The battle continued at higher intensity following the fall of the war chief, forcing Captain Bernard to retreat, where he was joined by reinforcements, Pete French and 65 ranchers and cowboys.

Wahweveh (Black Eagle), the brother of both Chief Paulina and Weahwewa (Wolf Dog), dragged Pony Blanket's severely injured body to safety as the battle continued even more intensely. Both of Pony Blanket's sons and his wife Evening Star were shot multiple times as they tried to reach him to give aid and all three died there on the banks of Silver Creek. His daughter survived and did reach him. Genega Taniwah (Dancer) and others tended his wounds and splinted his broken bones, and he did live, but would no longer lead from that day. Left Hand was promoted to war chief in his place, with political support from his son in law Wahi (Fox) the Lohim Shoshoni head chief, Potoptuah (Yellow Jacket), and Black Eagle.

Left Hand rallied his warriors, estimated at a thousand strong, left a mighty fire burning and led the entire band to escape from the Ochocos in the night, fooling the army troops into thinking they were standing their ground. The following morning, army scouts found ten bodies, including women and children. Later Colonel Thompson would claim that his soldiers had pulled forty two bodies from a rimrock crevice, among them war chief Buffalo Horn. On June 24, U.S. soldiers captured several women at Sage Hen Springs. They revealed Pony Blanket's survival and escape, the change in leadership, and Left Hand's flight leading them all toward the Umatilla Reservation to recruit more men, to Sarah Winnemucca, who at the time was serving as translator for General Howard (which she did). Howard continued his pursuit of Pony Blanket and Left Hand's retreat as they hurried slowly toward the Columbia River and an actual planned escape to Canada. Has No Horse and 150 of his warriors ran interference for them, creating havoc and destroying property on Howard's path. Howard's troops continued over Big Summit Prairie, where Left Hand faltered when his scouts reported 1000 cavalrymen advancing on their position. Pony Blanket was recovered enough to assume control again, and led a 30-mile wide path of destruction deeper into the Blue Mountains. He led a 90-mile forced march to Camas Creek (Oregon), off the North Fork of the John Day River, without a single battle. On July 4, on the Camas Prairie near Ukiah, Pony Blanket led a lethal attack against Captain Frank Vincent commanding the Pendleton volunteers and Captain Joe Wilson commanding the Prineville volunteers. Wilson and thirteen volunteers deserted back to Pendleton at the first volley, leaving Jacob Stroud to lead the Prineville volunteers. A teacher, William Lamar, was killed, and eight volunteers were seriously wounded. General Howard heard of the defeat on Camas Prairie by July 5, drew more rations and began to advance on Pony Blanket's contingent. He ordered Colonel Miles and his 500 troopers to the Umatilla Reservation to try to intercept Has No Horse's warriors, arriving July 9 to find the Umatilla Agency burned and Has No Horse's 1000 strong war party waiting to attack them. Umatilla allies of the Snakes watched from a hill overlooking the fight and when the Snakes abandoned the field against Miles' superior weaponry, these men negotiated with Miles and his officers to kill or capture Pony Blanket.

In September 1878, Joe and Dick Blackwell of Long Creek found Egan's elderly mother in law, with several other Shoshoni women who had been left for dead in Flower Gulch. She had been scalped and shot through the loins and was struggling for her life. She was nursed in the Blackwell home in Long Creek, then transferred to the Malheur Rreservation.

Egan was beheaded by an Umatilla scout working for the U.S. Cavalry, which ended the Bannock War.
