= Cardwell–Parrish House =

Historic building in Portland, Oregon, U.S.

- U.S. National Register of Historic Places
- Portland Historic Landmark
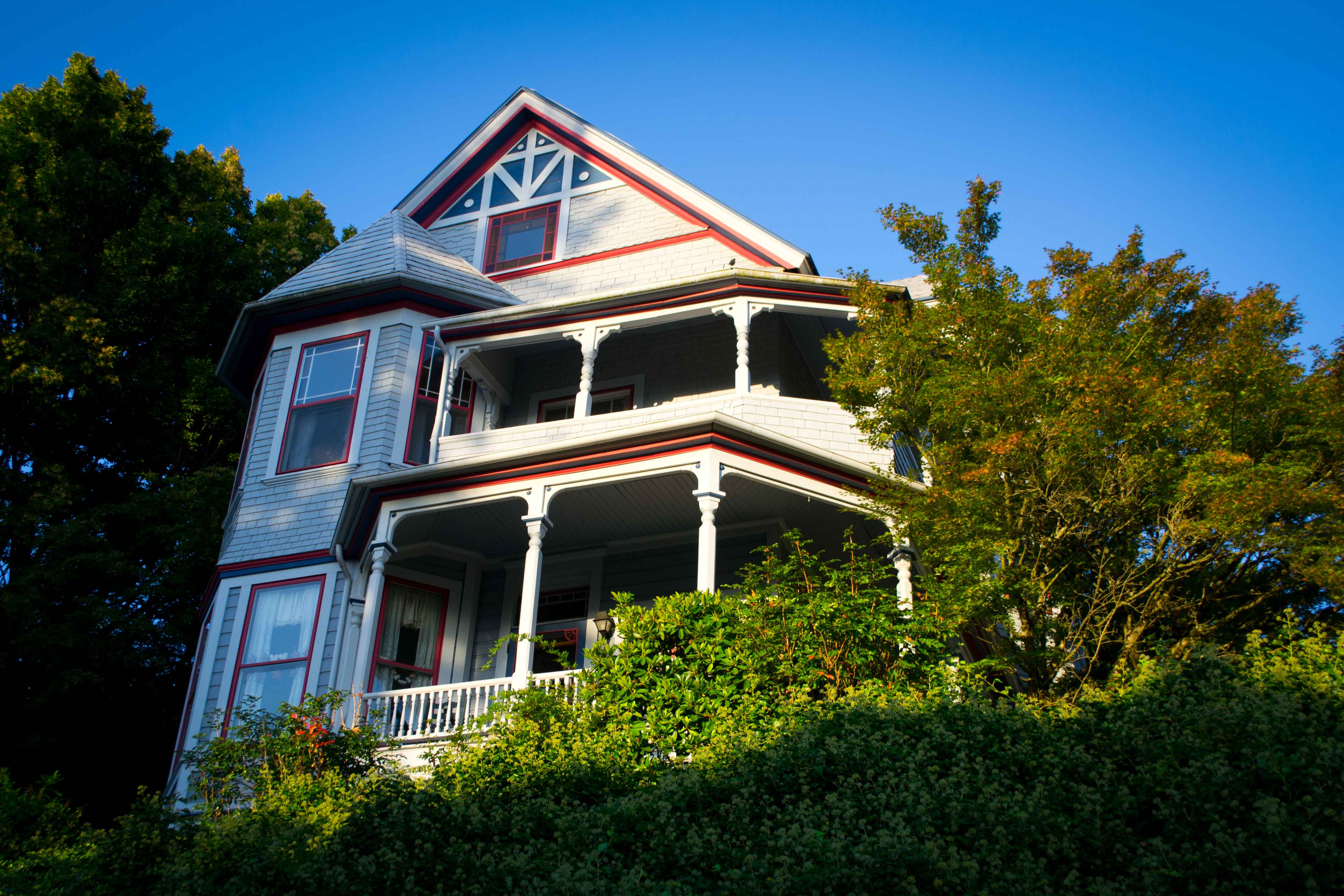
- The Cardwell–Parrish House in 2012.

- Location within Portland, Oregon
- Location: 7543 SW Fulton Park Boulevard; Portland, Oregon
- Coordinates: 45°28′11″N 122°40′27″W
- Area: 0.3 acres (0.12 ha)
- Built: 1888
- Architect: Robert W. Shoppell, W. H. Ball
- Architectural style: Stick/Eastlake, Queen Anne
- NRHP reference No.: 91000130
- Added to NRHP: February 22, 1991

The Cardwell–Parrish House is a house located in southwest Portland, Oregon listed on the National Register of Historic Places.

The house is named for both Byron P. Cardwell, an appointed tax collector, and Samuel B. Parrish, an Indian agent and later chief Portland Police Bureau, both of whom were early residents of the house.

== See also ==
- Samuel B. Parrish
- National Register of Historic Places listings in Southwest Portland, Oregon
