= Life Among the Piutes =

1883 book by Sarah Winnemucca

Life Among the Piutes: Their Wrongs and Claims
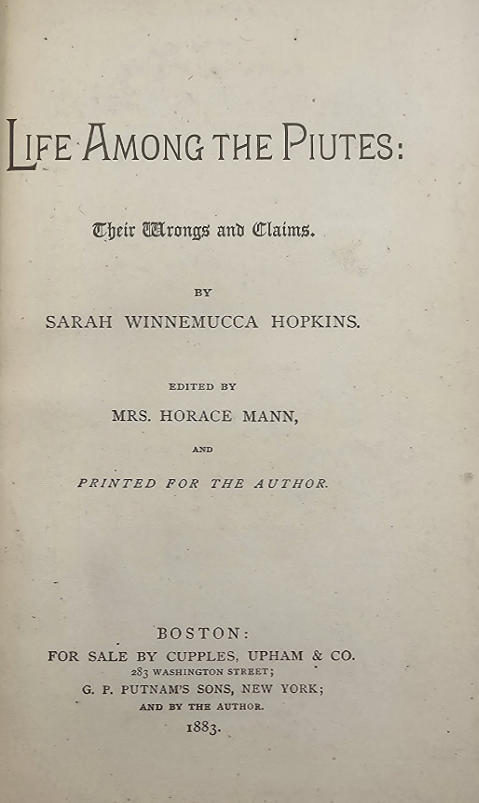
- Title page for Life Among the Piutes: Their Wrongs and Claims (1883)
- Author: Sarah Winnemucca
- Genre: Memoir
- Published: 1883
- Publisher: G.P. Putnam's Sons
- Pages: 268

Life Among the Piutes: Their Wrongs and Claims is a book that was written by Sarah Winnemucca in 1883. It is both an autobiographic memoir and a history of the Paiute people during their first forty years of contact with European Americans. It is considered the "first known autobiography written by a Native American woman." Anthropologist Omer Stewart described it as "one of the first and one of the most enduring ethnohistorical books written by an American Indian," frequently cited by scholars. Winnemucca wrote Life Among the Piutes: Their Wrongs and Claims while she was delivering lectures on the East Coast of the United States, advocating in the English language for the rights of the Northern Paiute people, and she was assisted in the funding, editing, and publishing of the book by sisters Elizabeth Palmer Peabody and Mary Peabody Mann.

== Political intentions ==
Winnemucca had been working as an advocate, diplomat, and interpreter for the Paiute people, utilizing her ability to speak English, since 1866. Her frequent interactions with and work alongside among the Anglo-Americans empowered her to act as a "politically savvy mediator" between the two cultures. In the face of marginalization by the U.S. government, violence by white settlers, and stereotypes of "savagery" that many Anglo-Americans held against her people, Winnemucca's intentions in writing Life Among the Piutes: Their Wrongs and Claims were candidly political. The purposes were to inform white audiences about the oppression of the Northern Paiutes, raise monetary support for her people, and defuse ethnically divisive stereotypes. The book ends with a supplication to her readers to sign a petition to the U.S. Congress requesting for the return of a piece of land to the Paiutes, uses strong pathos and detailed, emotionally-heavy imagery in describing the difficulties of reservation life, and calls for white audience responsibility with quotes such as "Oh my dear good Christian people, how long are you going to stand by and see us suffer at your hands?". For these reasons, the reliability of Life Among the Piutes: Their Wrongs and Claims as a purely autobiographical work has been questioned.
