= Truckee (chief) =

Medicine chief of the Northern Paiute and influential prophet

- Old Winnemucca, Captain Truckee
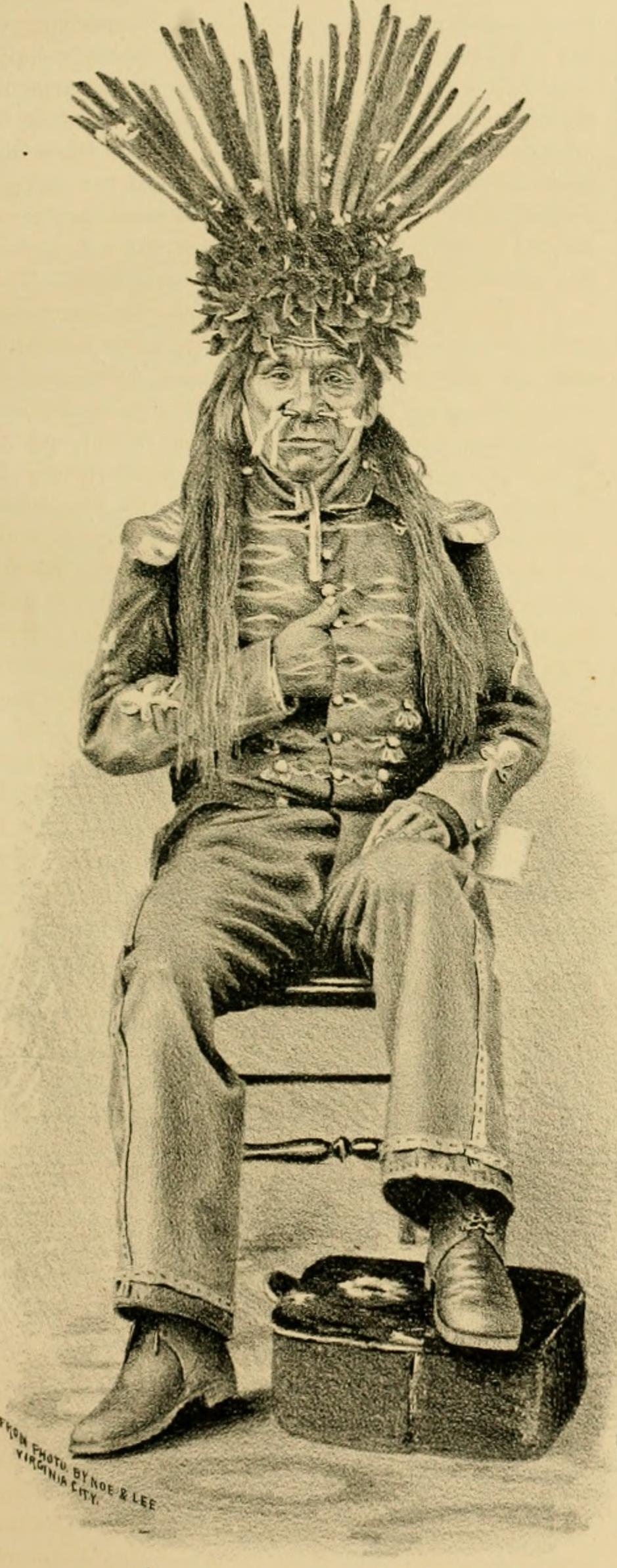
- Drawing of Truckee.
- Died: 1860
- Occupation: prophet
- Organization(s): Tribe: Kuyuidika band, Northern Paiute people (born a Shoshone)
- Successor: Winnemucca
- Children: Tuboitonie (daughter)
- Relatives: Winnemucca (son-in-law), Sarah Winnemucca (granddaughter)

Truckee (died 1860), also known as Captain Truckee, Wuna Mucca, The Giver of Spiritual Gifts, Old Winnemucca, One Moccasin, Onennamucca, One-ah-mucca), or Old Chief Winnemucca, was a medicine chief of the Northern Paiute people and an influential prophet. How he gained the name Truckee is up for debate as different accounts credit different people/groups with giving Winnemucca the nickname. Chief Truckee led his people through a rapidly changing time in California history while also becoming one of the most respected chiefs both by his people and to an extent by the settlers who he often aided. For simplicity he will be referred to as Truckee or Old Winnemucca for the rest of the article.

== Family life ==
Old Winnemucca was born a Shoshone and became a Paiute by marrying a Kuyuidika woman. He was the father of Tuboitonie and father-in-law to her husband Poito, who later inherited his name and became known as Winnemucca the Younger. Tuboitonie and Winnemucca the Younger were the parents of Sarah Winnemucca, making Old Winnemucca her maternal grandfather. In her work Sarah Winnemucca often commented on her grandfather as being an intense but thoughtful man who cared for all people, often taking in orphaned Native Americans and providing them with a new home. Many of Old Winnemucca's other descendants and family would also take on his name including two of his grandsons Natchez and Numaga.

== Gaining the Name Truckee ==
There are multiple differing accounts of how Chief Truckee gained the nickname he proudly carried the rest of his life, but most are in agreement that it was given to him by a Settler/Exploration Party he helped guide through the Sierra Nevadas. In his dealings with this group Old Winnemucca would use the Paiute word for alright; "Tro-kay", very often leading the group to believe that this was their guides name. In other instances Old Winnemucca is given the name Tru-ki-zo. Although this word does not have any known meaning in Paiute it is often another name seen when referring to the Chief.

== Relationship with United States settlers ==
He was friendly with white settlers and guided John C. Frémont during his Second expedition early in 1843. After his involvement in the Mexican-American War Truckee secured a letter of introduction from Frémont commending him for his support. In 1844, he guided the Stevens-Murphy-Townsend party of western emigrants to water. The stream was named Truckee River out of gratitude, and has been known by this name ever since. According to Sarah Winnemucca the Kuyuidika Band also had a brief interaction with the Donner Party in which they burned the winter supplies of the Natives who had originally planned on sharing with the group. Truckee's trust in the White Americans lead to his eventual decision to have his people educated by the Settlers, even sending his granddaughter Sarah to live and learn in William Ormsby's household.

== Involvement in the Mexican—American War ==
Although sources are few and often contradicting its known the Truckee played some role in the Conquest of California and possibly a few subsequent campaigns further south. In August 1846 when news of the war reached California John C. Frémont ordered a general call to arms for American settlers in the region. At this point accounts differ widely on how involved Truckee became with some reports saying he fought alongside only his close family and the few braves he had with him while others state that Truckee was given command over a whole Native Company numbering from 200 to 500 men. This would be in line with Truckee's insistence on being referred to by his military title "Captain" for the rest of his life. Upon the conclusion of the war Captain Truckee was awarded a Brevet for his bravery and heroism. Unfortunately a conclusive account of Captain Truckee's actions during the war will most likely never be known due to the few sources even written on the subject.

== Religious Beliefs and Influences ==
Truckee is widely regarded as a Prophet among many Western Native American Groups with his unique beliefs widely influencing the peoples of the Sierra Nevada's and Western Nevada. This faith was very much one shaped by the changing times and the arrival of American Explorers in the region as early as 1827 with Jedediah Smith's Expedition. Much like the Ghost Dance these beliefs stated that a great change was coming to the Native Americans, and to survive they had to become friends to the white settlers. His beliefs stated that men (Namely White and Native American) were descendants of a Common Ancestor and that they were finally being reunited after all this time. According to his granddaughter Sarah Winnemucca, Truckee also kept a paper he referred too as his "rag friend" which he stated had mystical powers such as allowing him to speak to his friends and allies. It was most likely a document of importance from Frémont, with it either being the letter of introduction or a document showing Truckee's Breveted Rank as a captain.

== Death and legacy ==
In October 1860, he developed a serious infection in his hand which multiple sources say was caused by a tarantula bite. Sarah Winnemucca, her father, and much of their family were present at his death. Shortly before his death he requested to be buried in the with a Bible gifted to him by John C. Frémont along with various other writings and mementos from his life. Six horses were also buried next to Truckee to help him reach the Spirit-land quicker as is custom in Paiute Burials.

The Native American chieftain lends his name to the community of Truckee, California as well as to the Truckee Range and Truckee River in Nevada.

== Known Descendants and Relatives of Truckee ==
Old Winnemucca(Truckee)	Unknown Kuyuidika Woman
{{{Winnemucca the Younger(Poito)}}}	{{{Tuboitonie}}}	{{{Unknown Uncle mentioned by Sarah}}}
Natchez (Little Winnemucca)	{{{Sarah Winnemucca}}}	Numaga (Young Winnemucca) Possibly a son of an Unknown Uncle
