= Sheepeater Indian War =

1879 conflict in Idaho, US

- Part of the American Indian Wars
Date	1879
Location	Idaho
Result	United States victory

Belligerents
United States; Troop G of 1st Cavalry; 2nd Infantry; 21st Infantry	Tukudeka

Commanders and leaders
General Oliver Howard; Capt. Reuben Bernard; Lt. Henry Catley; Lt. Edward Farrow	?

Strength
1st Cavalry: at least 60 Soldiers; 2nd Infantry: 48 Soldiers	?

Casualties and losses
1 killed	?

The Sheepeater War of 1879 was the last Indian war fought in the Pacific Northwest portion of the United States; it took place primarily in central Idaho. A high mountain band of approximately 300 Shoshone people, the Tukudeka were known as the Sheepeaters as Rocky Mountain sheep were a main staple of their food, clothing and tools. At the time, they were the last tribe living traditionally on the American Rocky Mountains. The Tukudeka became part of the Salmon Eater Shoshones after the war.

== Background ==
Leading up to the war, European-American settlers accused the Shoshone of stealing horses in Indian Valley and killing three settlers near present-day Cascade, Idaho during the pursuit. In August, the Shoshone were accused of killing two prospectors in an ambush at Pearsall Creek, five miles from Cascade. By February 1879 they were accused of the murders of five Chinese miners at Oro Grande, murders at Loon Creek, and finally the murders of two ranchers in the South Fork of the Salmon River in May, accusations for which there was no evidence.

== Campaign ==
United States troops were called into action based on the settlers' complaints. Heading the campaign against the Sheepeaters was Troop G of the 1st Cavalry, led by Captain Reuben Bernard; Company C and a detachment of Company K from the 2nd Infantry Regiment under the command of First Lieutenant Henry Catley; and 20 Indian scouts commanded by Lieutenant Edward Farrow of the 21st Infantry. The troops were all headed toward Payette Lake, near present-day McCall; Bernard headed north from Fort Boise, Catley headed South from Camp Howard, and Farrow headed East from the Umatilla Agency.

Throughout the campaign, the troops faced difficulty traveling through rough terrain. The first segment of the campaign, from May 31 to September 8, was through the Salmon River, dubbed the "River of No Return" as it was barely navigable. By August 20, a Sheepeater raiding party of ten to fifteen Indians attacked the troops as they guarded a pack train at Soldier Bar on Big Creek. Those who defended the pack train included Corporal Charles B. Hardin along with six troopers and the chief packer, James Barnes. They managed to drive the Sheepeaters off with only one casualty, Private Harry Eagan of the 2nd Infantry. By October, the campaign ended once Lieutenants W.C. Brown and Edward S. Farrow, along with a group of twenty Umatilla scouts, negotiated the surrender of the Sheepeaters.

== See also ==
- List of U.S. military history events
- Idaho
- Indian Wars
