= Edward S. Farrow =

Edward Samuel Farrow (April 20, 1855 in Snow Hill, Maryland – September 8, 1926) was a United States Army officer, author, and educator best known for his contributions to military training and reference works in the late 19th and early 20th centuries.

He was a commander in the American Indian Wars of the late 19th century. He is particularly known for his service in the Sheepeater Indian War. Farrow was a graduate of the West Point Military Academy in 1876, and was a commanding officer of Indian Scouts in the Department of the Columbia. He went on to become Assistant Instructor of Tactics at the US Military Academy (West Point), and published prolifically on the subject of Native American Indians, Military Training, and Mountain Scouting.

== Works ==
- Farrow, Edward S. (2000) [First published in 1881]. Mountain scouting: a hand-book for officers and soldiers on the frontiers (Print book). Foreword by Jerome A. Greene. Norman, Oklahoma: University of Oklahoma Press. ISBN 978-0-8061-3209-9. OCLC 42765211.
- A Military System of Gymnastics Exercises and a System of Swimming
- Farrows Manual on Military Training (1920)
- American Small Arms - A veritable Encyclopedia of Knowledge for Sportsmen and Military Men
- Farrow, Edward Samuel (1895) [First published in 1885]. Farrow's Military Encyclopedia; A Dictionary of Military Knowledge (Print book). Vol. 3 volumes, illustrated with maps and about three thousand wood engravings (2nd ed.). New York: Military-Naval Publishing Company. OCLC 993066046.
- Mineral Resources of Bland County in Southwestern Virginia
- Farrow, Edward S. (1918). A dictionary of military terms (Print book) (Rev. ed.). New York: Thomas Y. Crowell Co. OCLC 1266763.
- Gas Warfare
