= Fort Harney =

United States Army outpost in Oregon

- Harney County, Oregon, United States
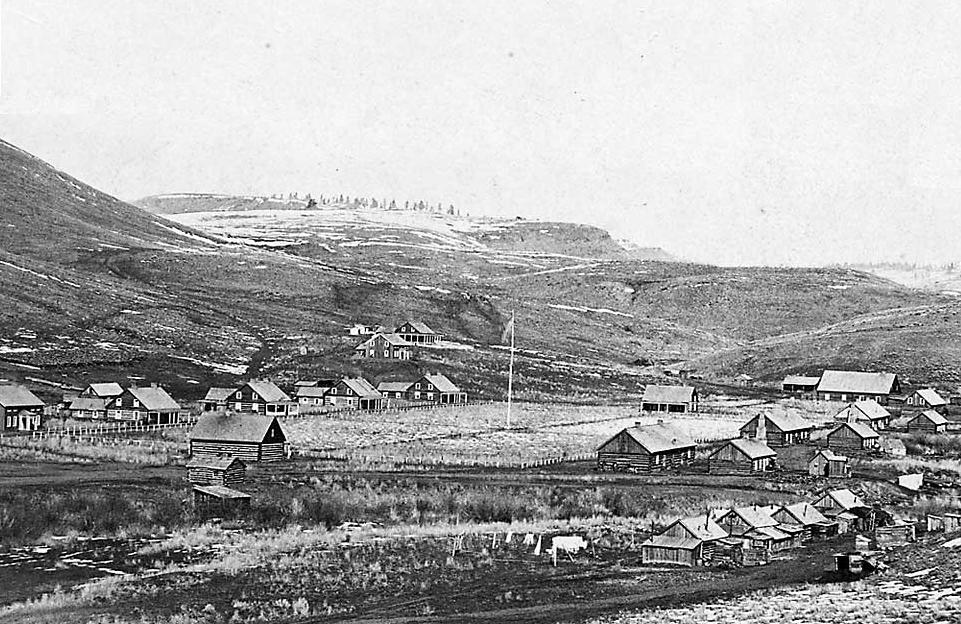
- Camp Harney in 1872

Site information
- Type: Military cantonments
- Owner: Private property

Location
- Coordinates: 43.66750°N 118.80778°W

Site history
- Built: 1867
- Built by: United States Army
- In use: 1867–1880

Fort Harney was a United States Army outpost in eastern Oregon named in honor of Brigadier General William S. Harney. Fort Harney was used as a supply depot and administrative headquarters from 1867 to 1880 during the Army's campaign against Northern Paiute bands in Eastern Oregon and the Bannock uprising in the same area. Today, nothing remains of Fort Harney except a small cemetery.

== Camp Harney ==
In 1864, the U.S. Army had begun using a site along Rattlesnake Creek, in what is now Harney County, Oregon, for temporary supply drops. The site was unofficially known as Rattlesnake Camp. As civilian wagon trains passing through eastern Oregon increased and the number of miners in the area grew, the demand for protection from Native American raiding parties required the Army to establish a number of permanent outposts in eastern Oregon. Rattlesnake Creek was located near the center of eastern Oregon, making it an ideal place for a military supply depot and administrative headquarters. The Army established a permanent outpost near the mouth of Rattlesnake Creek on 16 August 1867.

The post was originally called Camp Steele. Major General Henry W. Halleck, commander of the Military Department of the Pacific at the time, suggested the camp be named in honor of Brigadier General William S. Harney who commanded the Army's Department of Oregon in 1858 and 1859. Based on General Halleck's recommendation, the post was officially designated Camp Harney on 14 September 1867. The first unit to man Camp Harney was Company K of the 23rd Infantry Regiment.

== Military campaigns ==
In 1867 and 1868, General George Crook led companies from the 1st Cavalry Regiment and 8th Cavalry Regiment, mounted infantry from the 9th Infantry Regiment and 23rd Infantry Regiment, and Indian scouts from the Wasco and Warm Springs tribes in a successful campaign against Northern Paiute bands in eastern Oregon and northern California in part of the conflict known as the Snake War. Camp Harney was one of the outposts used to resupply Crook's troops during the campaign.

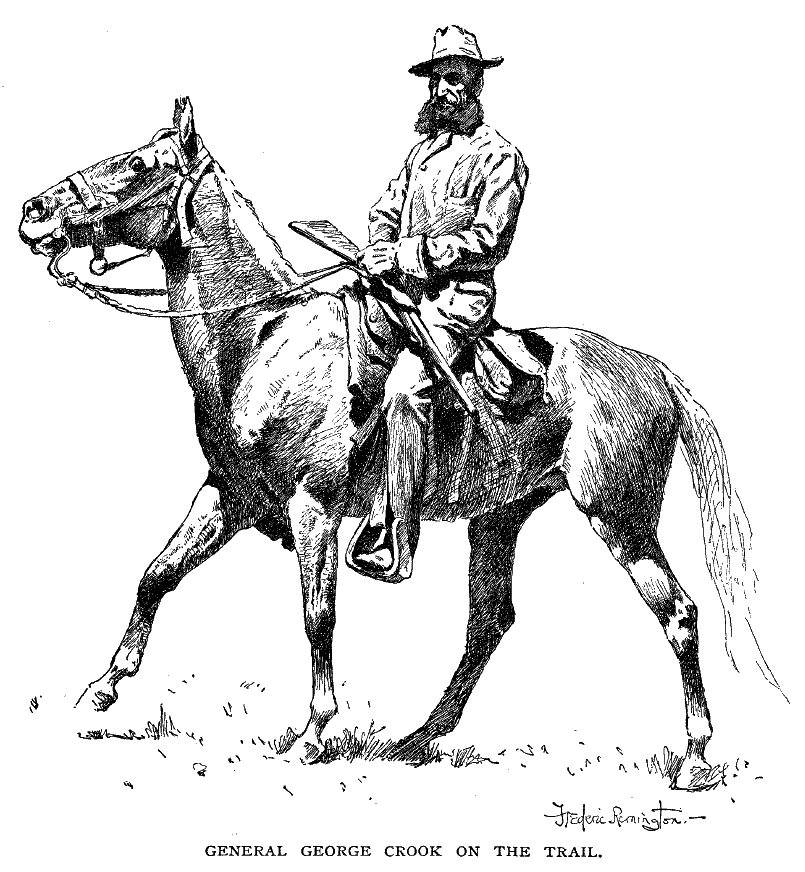
General Crook on patrol in Indian country

The Indian raids in eastern Oregon ended in 1869 after a treaty was signed by General Crook and Wewawewa, the chief of the area's dominant Paiute band. The treaty-signing ceremony was held at Fort Harney. In 1872, the local Paiute bands were settled on a 1.8-million-acre (7,300 km^{2}) reservation north of Malheur Lake in eastern Oregon. Camp Harney was within the reservation boundary. The camp housed Army troops assigned to guard the reservation from white trespassers and to keep the Paiutes from leaving. Despite the Army's presence, white settlers used reservation lands for grazing. This unchecked encroachment helped ignite the Bannock War in 1878.

During the Bannock War, Camp Harney once again served as an important Army supply depot and military headquarters. The camp was in the center of the conflict area and several newspapers reported that Camp Harney was in imminent danger of being overrun by Native American warriors. However, the US Army forces under General Oliver O. Howard quickly defeated the Bannocks and Paiutes engaged in the uprising. By January 1879, there were 543 Bannock and Paiute prisoners being held at Camp Harney. After the war, the prisoners were resettled on the Yakama Indian Reservation in the Washington Territory, 350 miles (560 km) north of the Malheur reservation.

The Army officially changed the name of the post to Fort Harney on 5 April 1879. However, without a reservation to guard, there was no reason to maintain the post. As a result, Fort Harney was abandoned on 13 June 1880. On 13 September 1882, the Malheur reservation lands were officially returned to the public domain except for the 320-acre (1.3 km^{2}) Fort Harney site which was retained by the Army. The Army returned the 320-acre (1.3 km^{2}) parcel to the public domain on 2 March 1889. After the fort was abandoned, local settlers dismantled the buildings, using much of the materiel to build up the nearby town of Harney City. Today, nothing remains of Fort Harney except a small cemetery.

== Fort infrastructure ==
In 1867, Camp Harney was busy and growing rapidly. It was located in the high desert country of eastern Oregon at an elevation of 4,265 feet (1,300 m) above sea level. The fort structures were built on a flat west of Rattlesnake Creek between steep ridges that flanked the stream. North of the site there were stands of pine that supplied the camp's sawmill with timber.

By 1877, Camp Harney was a well-developed frontier outpost. It had a large parade ground oriented north and south with a headquarters building and guardhouses. The fort included a home for the commanding officer plus five additional officers' quarters, two were log structures and three were frame buildings. There were three log barracks buildings for enlisted troops plus four log houses for enlisted men with families. To feed the men, the camp had mess halls, kitchens, a bakery, and a slaughterhouse to provide fresh meat. There were quartermaster's storehouses, a military commissary, a hospital, and a sawmill. The post also had a blacksmith shop and stables for 150 horses. In addition to Army troops, the post had four civilian clerks, two masons, one saddlemaker, a shoemaker, a painter, a baker, and four laundry maids.

== Location ==
The historic Fort Harney site is located 16 miles (26 km) east of Burns, Oregon. To reach the Fort Harney site from Burns, head east on U.S. Highway 20 for 12 miles (19 km); turn north on a gravel road leading to the ghost town of Harney City, which is two miles (3 km) from the highway. The Fort Harney site is located on private property about two miles (3 km) north of the Harney City town site.
