= Sarah Winnemucca =

Northern Paiute author, activist, and educator (c. 1844–1891)

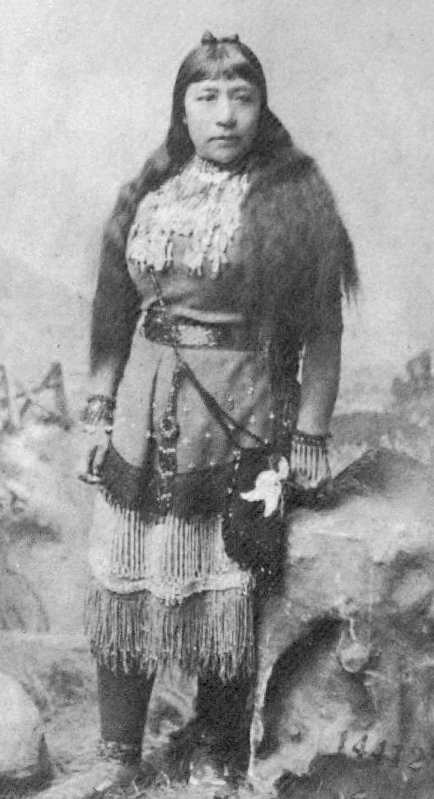
- Born: Thocmentony ("Shell Flower") c. 1844; Humboldt Lake, Nevada, U.S.
- Died: October 17, 1891; Henry's Lake, Idaho, U.S.
- Other name: Sarah Winnemucca Hopkins
- Occupations: Activist and spokeswoman for Northern Paiute
- Years active: 1870s–1891
- Known for: Advocacy for the Northern Paiute; interpreter and negotiator; author of Life Among the Piutes: Their Wrongs and Claims
- Notable work: Life Among the Piutes: Their Wrongs and Claims (1883)
- Spouses: Edward Bartlett (m. 1872; div. 1876) Lewis H. Hopkins (m. 1881; died 1887)
- Parents: Winnemucca (father); Tuboitonie (mother)
- Relatives: Truckee (grandfather)

Sarah Hopkins (née Winnemucca; c. 1844 – October 17, 1891) was a Northern Paiute writer, activist, lecturer, teacher, and school organizer. Her Northern Paiute name was Thocmentony, also spelled Tocmetone, which translates as "Shell Flower".

Sarah Winnemucca was born near Humboldt Lake, in present-day Nevada, into an influential Northern Paiute family who led their community in pursuing friendly relations with the arriving groups of Anglo-American settlers. She was the daughter of Chief Winnemucca of the Paiute nation and the granddaughter of Chief Truckee. At 16, Sarah studied at a Catholic school in San Jose, California. When the Paiute War erupted between the Pyramid Lake Paiute and the settlers, including some who were friends of the Winnemucca family, Sarah and some of her family traveled to San Francisco and Virginia City to escape the fighting. They made a living performing onstage as "A Paiute Royal Family". In 1865, while the Winnemucca family was away, their band was attacked by the U.S. cavalry, who killed 29 Paiutes, including Sarah's mother and several members of her extended family.

At the age of 27, Sarah began working in the Bureau of Indian Affairs at Fort McDermit in 1871 as an interpreter. Subsequently, Winnemucca became an advocate for the rights of Native Americans, traveling across the U.S. to tell Anglo- Americans about the plight of her people. When the Paiute were interned in a concentration camp at Yakima, Washington after the Bannock War, she traveled to Washington, D.C., to lobby Congress and the executive branch for their release. She also served U.S. forces as a messenger, interpreter, and guide, and as a teacher for imprisoned Native Americans.

Winnemucca published Life Among the Piutes: Their Wrongs and Claims (1883), which is both a memoir and a history of her people during their first 40 years of contact with European Americans. It is considered the "first known autobiography written by a Native American woman". Anthropologist Omer Stewart described it as "one of the first and one of the most enduring ethnohistorical books written by an American Indian", frequently cited by scholars. Following the publication of the book, Winnemucca toured the Eastern United States, giving lectures about her people in New England, Pennsylvania, and Washington, D.C. She returned to the West, founding a private school for Native American children in Lovelock, Nevada.

Since the late 20th century, scholars have paid renewed attention to Winnemucca for her accomplishments. In 1993, she was inducted posthumously into the Nevada Writers Hall of Fame. In 2005, the state of Nevada contributed a statue of her by sculptor Benjamin Victor to the National Statuary Hall Collection in the U.S. Capitol.

Winnemucca's legacy has been controversial. She was praised for her activism and social work to better living conditions for her people. However, she was criticized for a tendency to exaggerate her social status among the Paiute when speaking to outsiders. Among the Paiute, her assistance to the U.S. military at a time when they were at war with the Paiute was divisive, as was her advocacy for assimilation of Natives to Anglo-American culture.

== Early life and family ==
Born "somewhere near 1844" at Humboldt Lake in what is now western Nevada, Sarah Winnemucca was the daughter of Winnemucca (Poito), a Shoshone who had joined the Paiute through marriage, and his wife Tuboitonie. Her father was an influential war chief of a small band of about 150 Northern Paiute people. (Note: Although Sarah later said that her father was chief of all of the Northern Paiute, the Paiute had no such centralized leadership.) The town of Winnemucca, Nevada was named after her father. Winnemucca's grandfather, Tru-ki-zo or Truckee, had established positive relations with the European Americans who started exploring in the area. He guided Captain John C. Frémont during his 1843–45 survey and map-making expedition across the Great Basin to California. Later, Truckee fought in the Mexican–American War (1846–1848), earning many white friends and leading the way for his extended family's relationships with European Americans.

Sarah had an older sister Mary, younger brother Natchez, and sister Elma. She and her family spent her early childhood in eastern Oregon and western Nevada. She learned the ways of her people, including fishing and gathering plants. At the age of six, Winnemucca traveled with her family to near Stockton, California, where the adults worked in the cattle industry. In 1857, her grandfather arranged for Winnemucca (then 13) and her sister Elma to live and work in the household of William Ormsby and his wife; he had a hotel and was a civic leader of Carson City, Nevada. The couple wanted a companion for their daughter, Lizzie. The Winnemucca girls also did domestic work in the house. They had a chance to improve their English and learn more about European-American ways. After having some time to assimilate the difference between the two cultures, Winnemucca particularly began to be at ease in going back and forth between Paiute and European-American culture. She was one of the few Paiute in Nevada who knew how to read and write English, and her family all spoke English. She took on the English name Sarah. Winnemucca also spoke Spanish.

== Pyramid Lake War and stage ==
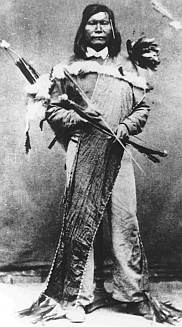
Numaga, or "Young Winnemucca", Sarah Winnemucca's cousin and war leader of the Paiute in the Pyramid Lake War

With the decreasing pressure of new migrants in the region attracted to the Washoe silver finds, Old Winnemucca arranged in 1859 to have his daughters returned to him again in Nevada. In 1860, open conflict occurred. At Williams Station, two Paiute girls were kidnapped and abused, leading the Paiute to kill five men at the station. Settlers and miners organized a militia, with Major William Ormsby leading it by default. He was killed by the Paiute in a disciplined confrontation in the first event of the Pyramid Lake War. Settlers were alarmed at how well the Paiute fought, and the ill-prepared miners could not hold their own. Young Winnemucca, Sarah's cousin, led the Paiute as a war chief during the war.

The Paiute and whites reached a truce that lasted four years, but it was a difficult time for the Paiute who lived on the Pyramid Lake Reservation, giving up their hunter-gatherer way of life. After the first year, they did not receive the promised supplies from the government and did not have the training needed to be effective farmers. Many Paiute starved to death. After Winnemucca begged for food for her people, military officials at Camp McDermit (later Fort McDermit) sent supplies.

As a mark of development, Nevada was established as a distinct U.S. Territory, and James W. Nye was appointed as its first governor. When he came to the territory, he went to the Pyramid Lake Reservation, where he met Old Winnemucca, Young Winnemucca and the Paiute, who put on a grand display. In October 1860, their grandfather Truckee died of a tarantula bite.

For the next five years (1860–1865), Winnemucca and her family frequently traveled away from the reservation, performing on stage, either in Virginia City, Nevada at Maguire's Opera House, or in San Francisco. They were billed as the "Paiute Royal Family". By this time, her father had taken a second, younger wife, with whom he had a young son.

In Nevada, U.S. forces repeatedly acted against Native Americans, in some cases as a show of force calculated to keep control rather than in response to any conflict or perceived wrongdoing. The Natives were repeatedly accused of raids and cattle stealing. In 1865, Almond B. Wells led a Nevada Volunteer cavalry in indiscriminate raids across the northern part of the state, attacking Paiute bands. While Winnemucca and her father were in Dayton, Nevada, Wells and his men attacked Old Winnemucca's camp, at Winnemucca Lake, killing 29 of the 30 persons in the band, who were old men, women and children.

The chief's two wives (including Winnemucca's mother) and infant son were killed. Although Winnemucca's sister Mary escaped from camp, she died later that winter due to the severe conditions. Her younger sister, Elma, was out of the area, as she had been adopted by a French family in Marysville, California. There, Elma Winnemucca married John Smith, a white man, and moved with him to a white community in Montana and, later, Idaho.

In 1868, about 490 Paiute survivors moved to Camp McDermit, on the Nevada–Oregon border. They sought protection from the U.S. Army against the Nevada Volunteers. In 1872, the federal government established the Malheur Reservation in eastern Oregon, designated by President Ulysses S. Grant for the Northern Paiute and Bannock peoples in the area. Three bands of Paiute moved there at the time. In 1875, Winnemucca, her brother Natchez and his family, and their father Old Winnemucca moved there, too.

== Teaching and interpreter ==
In 1871, at the age of 27, Winnemucca began working in the Bureau of Indian Affairs at Fort McDermitt as an interpreter, and later was invited to interpret at the Malheur Reservation by Indian Agent Samuel B. Parrish. She found in observing Parrish that he worked well with the Paiute; he encouraged them in learning some new ways and helped them plant crops that could support the people, establishing a well-managed agricultural program. He had a school built at the reservation, and Winnemucca became an assistant teacher. She was also an interpreter for the U.S. Army and a lecturer across the western United States. In the 1880s, she lectured across the eastern United States and taught at Fort Vancouver and Peabody Institute in Lovelock, Nevada.

== First marriage ==
Winnemucca married Edward Bartlett, a former First Lieutenant in the Army, on January 29, 1872, at Salt Lake City, Utah. He abandoned her, and she returned to Camp McDermit. In 1876, after having moved to Malheur Reservation, she got a divorce and filed to take back her name of Winnemucca, which the court granted. In the divorce decree, Sarah stated what she did to support herself when her husband left her with no money, writing, "I did sewing. I made gloves for a living."

== Bannock War ==
Parrish was replaced in the summer of 1876 by agent William V. Rinehart. The Paiute were sorry to see Parrish leave. A proponent of extermination-style warfare, Rinehart emphasized keeping the Paiute under his thumb. He reversed many of the policies that Parrish had initiated, telling the Paiute the reservation land belonged to the government. He failed to pay their workers for agricultural labor in communal fields, and alienated many tribal leaders. Conditions at the Malheur Reservation quickly became intolerable.

In her 1883 book, Winnemucca recounted that Rinehart sold supplies intended for the Paiute people to local whites. Much of the good land on the reservation was illegally expropriated by white settlers. In 1878, virtually all of the Paiute and Bannock people left the reservation because of these abuses and their difficulties in living. The Bannock from southern Idaho had left the Fort Hall Reservation due to similar problems. They moved west, raiding isolated white settlements in southern Oregon and northern Nevada, triggering the Bannock War (1878). The degree to which Northern Paiute people participated with the Bannock is unclear. Winnemucca wrote that she and several other Paiute families were held hostage by the Bannock during the war.

During the Bannock War, Winnemucca worked as a translator for General Oliver O. Howard of the U.S. Army, whom she had met during his visit to the reservation; she also acted as a scout and messenger. According to her account, the Bannock warriors and the Army soldiers liked each other so much that they rarely shot to kill. For whatever reason, casualties were relatively few. Winnemucca was highly regarded by the officers she worked for, and she included letters of recommendation from several of them in her 1883 book. Impressed by many of the officers, Winnemucca began to support the U.S. Army's position to have the military take over administration of the Indian reservations, rather than political appointees. (Note: After the 1870 Marias Massacre by U.S. Army forces in Montana, President Grant had promoted a peace policy, appointing Quaker leaders as Indian agents to reservations and intending to eradicate problems of corruption that way.)

== Move to Yakama Reservation ==
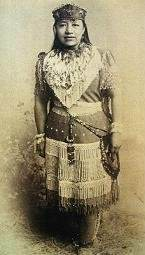
Sarah Winnemucca, performing as "Princess Winnemucca", daughter of Chief Winnemucca

Following the Bannock War, the Northern Paiute bands were ordered from Nevada to the Yakama Indian Reservation (in eastern Washington Territory), where they endured great deprivation. A total of 543 Paiute were interned in what has been described as a "concentration camp".

Winnemucca accompanied them to serve as a translator. Since she had an official job, she was not required to live on a reservation. Outraged by the harsh conditions forced on the Paiute, she began to lecture across California and Nevada on the plight of her people. During the winter of 1879 and 1880, she, her father, and two other Winnemucca visited Washington, D.C., to lobby for release of the Paiute from the Yakama Reservation. They gained permission from Secretary of the Interior, Carl Schurz, for the Paiute to be allowed to return to Malheur, at their own expense. Instead, the government decided to "discontinue" the Malheur Reservation in 1879, closing it.

Knowing the temper of the people through whom they must pass, still smarting from the barbarities of the war two years previous, and that the Paiutes, utterly destitute of everything, must subsist themselves on their route by pillage, I refused permission for them to depart... and soon after, on being more correctly informed of the state of affairs, the Hon. Secretary revoked his permission though no determination as to their permanent location was arrived at. This was a great disappointment to the Paiutes and the greatest caution and care was necessary in dealing with them.

— James H. Wilbur, Yakama Agent, Annual Report of the Commissioner of Indian Affairs for the Year 1881

== Second marriage ==
In 1881, General Oliver O. Howard hired Winnemucca to teach Shoshone prisoners held at Vancouver Barracks. While there, she met and became close to Lieutenant Lewis H. Hopkins, an Indian Department employee. They married that year in San Francisco. Winnemucca's husband had contributed to his wife's efforts by gathering material for the book at the Library of Congress. But, in doing so, he ran through Winnemucca's money. Her husband died of tuberculosis on October 18, 1887, and was buried in Lovelock at the Lone Mountain Cemetery. Despite a bequest from Mary Peabody Mann and efforts to turn the school into a technical training center, Winnemucca was struggling financially by the time of her husband's death in 1887.

== Lectures and writing ==
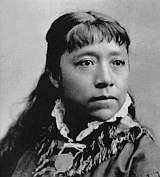
Sarah Winnemucca

In 1883, the Hopkinses traveled east, where Winnemucca delivered nearly 300 lectures throughout major cities of the Northeast and Mid-Atlantic, seeking to heighten awareness of injustice against Native Americans. The press reported her talks and sometimes referred to her as the "Paiute Princess" or "Indian princess".

In Boston, Winnemucca met the sisters Elizabeth Peabody and Mary Peabody Mann, the latter married to the educator Horace Mann; they began to promote her speaking career. In addition, the two women helped her to compile and prepare her lecture materials for publication as Life Among the Piutes. Her book was published in 1883, the "first known autobiography written by a Native American woman" and the first U.S. copyright registration secured by a Native American woman.

After returning to Nevada in 1884, Winnemucca spent a year lecturing in San Francisco. When she returned again to Pyramid Lake, she and her brother built a school for Indian children at Lovelock, Nevada, in order to promote the Paiute culture and language. The Peabody Indian School, named for its benefactor Mary Peabody Mann in Boston, operated for a couple of years. Changes in federal policy following what was considered the success of the Carlisle Indian School prompted the federal government to promote education for Native American children at English-language boarding schools. Winnemucca's school was closed in 1887 and the children were transferred to a facility in Grand Junction, Colorado.

The Dawes Severalty Act of 1887 required allotment of communal lands on reservations to individual households to force assimilation of tribes.

== Later years and death ==
Winnemucca spent the last four years of her life retired from public activity. She died of tuberculosis at her sister Elma Smith's home at Henry's Lake, Idaho.

== Legacy ==
- Anthropologist Omer C. Stewart has described Winnemucca's book about the Paiute as "one of the first and one of the most enduring ethnohistorical books written by an American Indian", frequently cited by scholars through the 20th century.
- In 1993, Sarah Winnemucca was inducted into the Nevada Writers Hall of Fame.
- In 1994, a Washoe County, Nevada elementary school was named in her honor.
- In 1994, Sarah Winnemucca was inducted into the National Women's Hall of Fame.
- In 2005, the state of Nevada contributed a statue of Winnemucca to the National Statuary Hall Collection in the U.S. Capitol.

== Works ==
By Winnemucca

- 1870, Winnemucca, Sarah, Letter ... to Commissioner of Indian Affairs, Parker : Camp McDermit, Nevada, 1870 April 4, OCLC 85036391. The original letter was addressed to Major H. Douglass. Forwarded by him, with his report as Indian Superintendent, Nevada, to Ely Samuel Parker.
- 1883, Life Among the Piutes: Their Wrongs and Claims. G.P Putnam's Sons. 1883. (new edition in 1994 ISBN 978-0-259-44619-4)
- 1885, Winnemucca, Sarah, Sarah Winnemucca Hopkins letter, to Grover Cleveland, 1885 March 6, OCLC 1359275624

With Winnemucca or her papers or lecturers

- 1886 pamphlet, Peabody, Elizabeth Palmer; Abbott, Lyman (1886). Sarah Winnemucca's practical solution of the Indian problem : a letter to Dr. Lyman Abbot of the 'Christian Union'. Cambridge, Massachusetts: J. Wilson and Son. OCLC 860385045.
- 2015 Winnemucca, Sarah (June 2015). Cari M. Carpenter; Carolyn Sorisio (eds.). The newspaper warrior : Sarah Winnemucca Hopkins's campaign for American Indian rights, 1864-1891. Lincoln, Nebraska: University of Nebraska Press. ISBN 978-0-8032-4368-2.. Based upon an anthology of publications about Winnemucca and her lectures .

== Bibliography ==
- Canfield, Gae Whitney (1988). Sarah Winnemucca of the Northern Paiutes. Norman, Oklahoma: University of Oklahoma Press. ISBN 978-0-8061-2090-4.
- Fowler, Catherine (1994). Foreword. Life Among the Paiutes: Their Wrongs and Claims. By Winnemucca, Sarah. University of Nebraska Press.
- Howard, Major-General O. O. (1908). Toc-Me-To-Ne, An Indian Princess. St. Nicholas magazine, Scribner & Company.
- Utley, Robert M. (1973). "Grant's Peace Policy, 1869-74". Frontier Regulars the United States Army and the Indian, 1866–1891. Lincoln, NE: University of Nebraska Press. ISBN 0-8032-9551-0.
- Zanjani, Sally (2001). Sarah Winnemucca. Reno NV: University of Nevada Press. ISBN 0-8032-4917-9.
- Zanjani, Sally (January 1, 2004). Sarah Winnemucca. U of Nebraska Press. ISBN 978-0-8032-9921-4.
- Carpenter, Cari M. (April 1, 2016). "Sarah Winnemucca Goes to Washington". American Indian Quarterly. 40 (2): 87–108. doi:10.5250/amerindiquar.40.2.0087.
