= Malheur Indian Reservation =

American Indian reservation in Oregon and Nevada

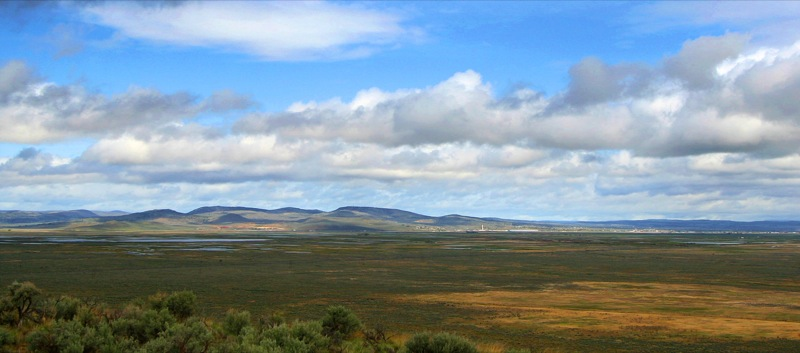
Harney Basin looking from Wright's Point north towards Burns, Oregon, and to the Blue Mountains in the distance.

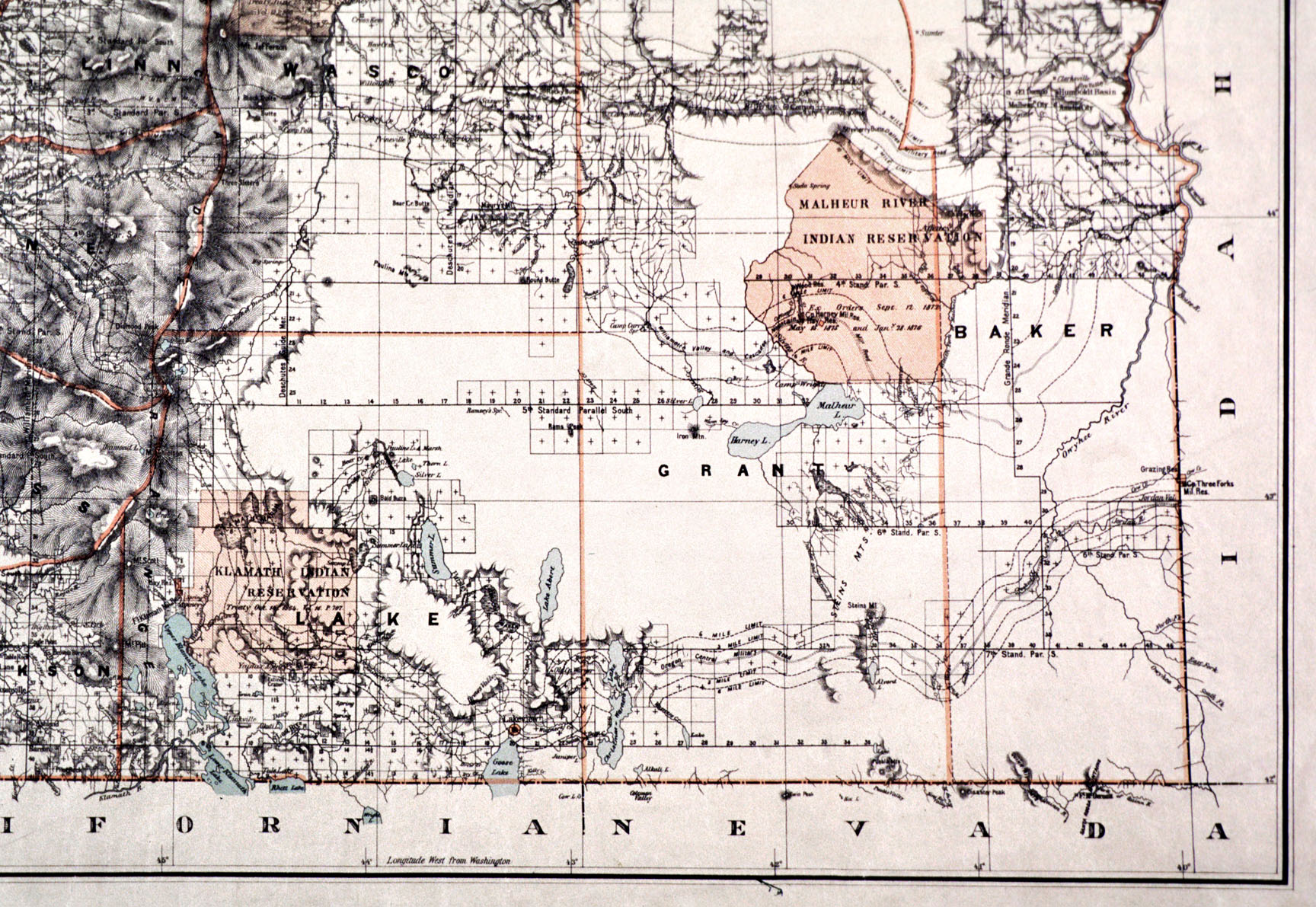
Map of the Malheur Reservation drawn by the U.S. General Land Office

The Malheur Indian Reservation was an American Indian reservation established for the Northern Paiute in eastern Oregon and northern Nevada from 1872 to 1879. The federal government discontinued the reservation after the Bannock War of 1878, under pressure from European-American settlers who wanted the land. This negative recommendation against continuing by its agent William V. Rinehart, led to the internment of more than 500 Paiute on the Yakama Indian Reservation, as well as the reluctance of the Bannock and Paiute to return to the lands after the war.

== Establishment ==
On September 12, 1872, a presidential order by Ulysses S. Grant set aside the Malheur Indian Reservation in Eastern Oregon for the Northern Paiute. It was intended for "all the roving and straggling bands in Eastern and Southeastern Oregon, which can be induced to settle there." The goal was to reduce conflict between the Paiute, who were struggling to find enough food for survival, and the settlers, whose farms and ranches encroached on their territory. About 800 Northern Paiute were living in settlements and at Forts Harney and Klamath in Southern Oregon, Fort Bidwell in northeastern California, and Fort McDermitt in northern Nevada. Three bands went to the reservation, led by chiefs Weahwewa, Watta-belly, and Egan. In 1875, Old Winnemucca of the Paiute, his daughter Sarah and son Natchez Winnemucca went to Malheur Indian Reservation. In 1865 they had lost 29 of 30 people in a band in a raid by Nevada Volunteer cavalry, including the chief's two wives, one of whom was the mother of Sarah and Natchez.

The reservation covered roughly the drainage basin of the South, Middle and North forks of the Malheur River. It comprised approximately 2,285 square miles (5,920 km^{2}) or 1,462,400 acres (5,918 km^{2}). At that time, salmon still migrated up the Columbia and the Snake rivers into the North Fork from the Pacific Ocean.

== Reductions and incursions ==
Almost immediately, European American settlers began requesting changes to the boundaries of the reservation in order to take over more land. In 1876, settlers asked for the exclusion of the Silvies River Valley and the Harney Lake Basin on the southwest edge of the reservation. In January of that year, President Grant, under pressure from settlers, ordered the northern shores of Malheur Lake open for settlement. This was a blow to the Paiute, because that was an area where the tribe collected wada (Suaeda calceoliformis) seeds, which they gathered as food. (The Paiute around Malheur Lake were known as the Wadatika: the "wada-seed-eaters".) Settlers along Willow Creek Valley on the eastern edge of the reservation also protested the boundaries.

The reservation straddled trails between then northern Grant County, where Chief Joseph of the Nez Perce had received orders to move with his people to Idaho, and southern Grant County. With the completion of major portions of the transcontinental railroad in 1868, cattle ranchers in the former Nez Perce lands had begun to drive herds along those trails to Central Pacific railheads such as Winnemucca, Nevada, for shipment to the East. In the high desert country of Eastern Oregon, the ranchers considered the streams and pastures along those trails as highly valuable for sustaining the cattle on the drives. But, the cattle consumed water and were pastured in lands that were reserved for the Paiute.

== Bannock War (1878) ==
The outbreak of the Bannock War in May 1878 in Idaho led the Paiute to abandon the Malheur Indian Reservation and take refuge on Steens Mountain to the south of the Harney Basin. The mountain is a large block-fault formation, and its eastern escarpment rises almost straight up from the Alvord Desert, making it relatively easy to defend.

They were later joined there during the summer by the Bannock coming west from Idaho. When U. S. Army units under the command of General Oliver O. Howard began moving toward their positions, the united Paiute and Bannock decided to move into the Blue Mountains to the north of the Harney Basin. They raided isolated ranches as they fled northward, killing some settlers, and taking horses and cattle. In engagements with the Army, both Paiute and soldiers were killed, but casualties were few, given that hundreds of soldiers were operating on each side.

Near the Umatilla Agency on the Columbia River, the Umatilla saw that the Paiute and Bannock were not going to prevail against the U.S. Army, which outnumbered the Native Americans. The Umatilla allied with the Army. Under the guise of negotiation, some warriors entered an encampment of Paiute and Bannock, where they killed Egan, one of the principal Paiute war leaders, and a number of his followers. After that point, having lost their leader, scattered bands of Paiute took refuge in the mountains, and many of the Bannock tried to return to Idaho. Ultimately, most Paiute surrendered. Together with Bannock prisoners, they were initially interned at the Malheur Indian Reservation.

== Removal and discontinuation ==
In November 1878, General Howard received orders to move about 543 Paiute and Bannock prisoners from the Malheur Indian Reservation to the Yakama Indian Reservation, in Washington Territory, 350 miles (560 km) to the north. Other Paiute and Bannock were scattered about Eastern Oregon, northeastern California and northern Nevada, working for settlers or engaged in subsistence hunting and gathering. More than a year after the war, most had not moved back onto the reservation, although the U.S. government had urged them to do so. Still others were interned at Vancouver Barracks in Washington.

Ranchers and settlers had started to graze their herds on the best meadowlands of the Malheur Indian Reservation, and the U.S. Army had been reluctant to remove the trespassers. In his annual report in August 1879, Agent W. V. Rinehart, who had fought in the West under General Crook and held negative views of the Natives, opined that the reservation should be discontinued, in part because the support for all agencies in Oregon was spread too thin to be effective. In October of that year, the Commissioner of Indian Affairs discontinued the agency.

== Burns Paiute Indian Reservation ==
Today a small group of Paiute lives on a small allotment of 760 acres (3.1 km^{2}), called the Burns Paiute Indian Reservation (or the Burns Paiute Colony) along the Silvies River, just north of Burns, Oregon. Other Paiute are federally recognized as distinct tribes on other reservations.

== See also ==
- Fort McDermitt Indian Reservation
- Harney Basin
- List of Indian reservations in Oregon
