= George Byron Currey =

Union Army officer

George Byron Currey (April 4, 1833 – March 6, 1906) was a pioneer, lawyer, soldier, farmer, and editor in the U.S. state of Oregon. A native of Indiana, he served as an officer in the 1st Oregon Volunteer Cavalry Regiment and then the 1st Oregon Volunteer Infantry Regiment, before being appointed commander of the District of the Columbia at the end of the American Civil War as well as in the Snake War in 1865.

== Early life ==
Currey was born at Crawfordsville, Indiana, April 4, 1833, and was educated at Wabash College in Indiana as a lawyer. He came to Oregon over the Oregon Trail in 1853, and was admitted to the bar and practiced law near Eugene in the Willamette Valley. In 1864, Currey married Jennie Clarissa Gaines of Yamhill County.

== Military career ==
During the Rogue River Indian War in the 1850s, Currey served in the Territorial forces. During the American Civil War, in 1862 Currey raised Company E, of the First Oregon Cavalry in Wasco County and was its captain during much of its service and later captain of Company A. In early 1865, Currey was made lieutenant colonel. In June 1865, Currey was made colonel of 1st Oregon Volunteer Infantry Regiment, and was appointed commander of District of Oregon from (July 14, 1865), then commander of the Department of the Columbia (July 30, 1865 – November 20, 1865) following the death of George Wright.

=== Snake War ===
In the fall of 1865, Colonel Currey was planning a winter campaign against the Snake Indians in eastern Oregon. He sent detachments of the 1st Oregon Infantry along with Oregon cavalry units to establish camps in their territory. Detachment commanders were instructed to build winter quarters at their posts and prepare for a winter offensive. Winter provisions were to follow in supply wagons. However, Colonel Currey was released from duty in November 1865 along with the men from the First Infantry. His successor Lieutenant Colonel John M. Drake was released from service in December, so the planned winter campaign never got started. It remained for George Crook to institute winter campaigns, like Curry intended, that brought that war to a close.

== Later life and death ==
After leaving the Army, Currey returned to private life and practiced law at Salem from 1866 to 1868. He farmed near Lafayette in northwest Oregon from 1868 to 1872. Currey then moved to Eastern Oregon where he practiced law at Canyon City from 1872 to 1880. He also served as a presidential elector in 1882. George Byron Currey died of epilepsy in La Grande, Oregon, on March 6, 1906.
