= 1st Nevada Cavalry Battalion =

- Active: 17 June 1863 – 21 July 1866
- Country: United States of America
- Allegiance: Union
- Branch: Army
- Type: Cavalry
- Garrison/HQ: Fort Churchill, NV
- Engagements: Snake War: Battle of Mud Lake (Co. E)

Commanders
- Notable commanders: Lt Colonel Alfred A. C. Williams; Lt Colonel Milo George; Maj Noyes Baldwin

The 1st Nevada Cavalry Battalion, or the Nevada Territory Cavalry Volunteers, was a unit raised for the Union army during the American Civil War. It remained in the west, garrisoning frontier posts, protecting emigrant routes, and engaged in scouting duties. The unit was disbanded in July 1866.

== Organization ==
=== Commanding Officers ===
- Major Alfred A. C. Williams (18 Mar-6 Apr 1864), 6 Apr 1864 promoted to lieutenant colonel
- Lt. Colonel Alfred A. C. Williams (6 Apr-21 Dec 1864), 21 December 1864 resigned
- Major Milo George (9 Apr-22 Dec 1864), 22 Dec 1864 promoted to lieutenant colonel upon Williams' resignation
- Lt. Colonel Milo George (22 Dec 1864-10 Jan 1865), 22 Nov 1865 mustered out
- Major Noyes Baldwin (21 Feb-31 Mar 1865), promoted 31 Mar 1865 from Company B

=== Companies ===
Company	Commander	Enlisted Strength
Company A	Elias B. Zabriske	137
Company B	Noyes Baldwin (31 Mar 1865 promoted Major); Joseph H. Matthewson	131
Company C	Henry C. Johnson (dismissed from service); John H. Dalton	129
Company D	Milo George (9 Apr 1864 promoted Major); Almond B. Wells (promoted from Company A)	152
Company E	Robert C. Payne	122
Company F	Joseph W. Calder	117

== History ==
=== Recruitment ===
In the spring of 1862, recruiting for the army in the Nevada Territory began in Virginia City. These early volunteers were mustered into the 3rd California Cavalry Regiment, and occupied military posts within the territory. The following spring, Nevada was authorized to raise their own battalion of cavalry for three-years service. Recruitment offices were first opened at Gold Hill and Silver City, and the first men began mustering in on 17 June 1863. Other recruiting stations were later opened in Aurora, Carson City and Genoa and the battalion of six companies would be completed in April 1864.

Company A was recruited in Silver City under Elias Brevoort "Buck" Zabriske who then became captain. Company B was recruited in Gold Hill under Joseph H. Matthewson who became lieutenant and Noyes Baldwin became captain. These two companies were mustered into service in Salt Lake City. Being the ranking captain, Zabriske was offered command of the two companies but declined. Baldwin was then placed in command.

Four more companies were added to the battalion after its mustering. Company C was recruited throughout the state with John H. Dalton as captain. Company D was recruited in Gold Hill with Milo George as captain. Company E was recruited at Genoa, Carson City and Silver City with Robert Lyon as captain. Company F was recruited in Aurora with Joseph W. Calder as captain.

Having never reached full regimental strength, no colonel was appointed to command. Alfred A. C. Williams was appointed major of the battalion on March 18, 1864, and served as the completed battalion's first commander. A month later on April 6, Williams was promoted to lieutenant colonel and Milo George of Company D became major. Major George served as the post commander of Camp Nye in Carson City, Nevada, with Companies D and E. Williams resigned on December 21, 1864, and George was promoted to the lieutenant colonelcy the following day with Noyes Baldwin eventually succeeding to the position of major on March 31, 1865. Lieutenant Colonel George was in command of the battalion when it was mustered out of service in 1865.

=== Operations ===
The companies, or detachments of, were engaged in various scouting missions and fort garrisoning during their service. Companies A and B left for the Utah Territory in 1864, where they encamped at Fort Bridger, Companies C and F manned Camp Douglas in Utah, while the other two were engaged in numerous skirmishes with hostiles throughout Nevada.

The Expedition to the Humboldt River took Captain Wells and Company D on a 1,200 mile scouting operation, from their camp at Fort Churchill north and west to the California border and back. In the 84 days, they never engaged or saw any hostile Indians.

The Pyramid Lake, Walker Lake and Mud Lake operations in March 1865 involved Companies D and E investigating the murders of miners and the theft of cattle from settlers. The 10 March incident at Walker Lake with Capt Wallace and Company E was settled quickly, with the suspected murderers being handed over by the Northern Paiute band. For Capt Wells and Company E, however, encountering the Smoke Creek Paiutes at Mud Lake (now Winnemucca Lake) on 14 March became a battle (see "Battle of Mud Lake"). Though only one man was wounded, twenty-nine Indians were killed in the action. Reports from both sides offer largely different versions of the incident, like the question of whether or not members of Company E did things like throwing an infant onto a fire to die.

Table (or Godfrey's) Mountain, 20 May 1865. Capt Littlefield, with 35 men of Company D, while on a scouting run near Paradise Valley, encountered a large band of Northern Paiutes. Largely outnumbered, he returned to camp to notify Captain Almond Wells, who gathered up Co. E and returned to the scene with a force of 65 soldiers. Chief Zeluawick, with 500 Paiute, Shoshone and Bannock warriors, held a position on top of a butte. Wells, Littlefield and 40 men (the remainder of the force keeping the horses) charged up the hill and fought until night fall, when a retreat was ordered. Two soldiers were killed and four wounded in the attempted assault.

Skirmishes with these bands of Paiutes continued throughout the summer, with additional troops of the 1st Battalion Nevada Volunteer Infantry and 2nd California Cavalry Regiment taking part. Companies D and E, along with a detachment from Company F, were mustered out on 18 November 1865. Companies A, B and C were mustered out of service on 12 July 1866, while the remainder of Company F stayed on until 21 July.

== See also ==
- Nevada in the American Civil War
- List of Nevada Civil War units
