= Camp Lapwai =

US army encampment

Coordinates: 46.45°N 116.8167°W

Location of Camp Lapwai in present-day north central Idaho

Camp Lapwai was a United States Army encampment in Washington Territory, present-day Idaho. It was established by Company E, 1st Regiment Washington Territory Volunteer Infantry. After being mustered in at Alcatraz at San Francisco, California, they were ordered on October 19, 1862, to Camp Lapwai near the Nez Perce Agency. Joined there at the beginning of November by Company "F", 1st Oregon Volunteer Cavalry Regiment, they built the encampment. Camp Lapwai was renamed Fort Lapwai in 1863; the new Idaho Territory was also established in 1863.

== Garrisons ==
- Company E, 1st Regiment Washington Territory Volunteer Infantry October, October 1862 - June 1864
- Company "F", 1st Oregon Volunteer Cavalry Regiment, November, 1862 - May 1865.

== See also ==
- Fort Lapwai
- Lapwai, Idaho
- Nez Perce people
