= John M. Drake =

- Civil War veteran John M. Drake
- Born: December 31, 1830; Stroudsburg, Pennsylvania, US
- Died: December 11, 1913 (aged 82); Portland, Oregon, US
- Military career
- Allegiance: United States of America (Union)
- Branch: Union Army
- Service years: 1861–1865
- Rank: Lieutenant colonel
- Units: 1st Oregon Cavalry; 1st Oregon Volunteer Infantry
- Conflicts: American Civil War; Indian skirmishes
- Other work: Purchasing agent for Oregon Railway and Navigation Company

John Miller Drake (December 31, 1830 – December 11, 1913) was a Union Army officer in the 1st Oregon Cavalry and the 1st Oregon Infantry regiments during the American Civil War. He eventually reached the rank of lieutenant colonel. He led one of the first campaigns to respond to the threat Chief Paulina posed to settlers and rival Indians in central Oregon. Later he was a purchasing agent for the Oregon Railway and Navigation Company.

== Early life ==
Drake was born in Stroudsburg, Pennsylvania on December 31, 1830. He attended Stroudsburg Academy and Yale University before traveling to California in 1849 during the California Gold Rush. After living in California for almost a decade, he moved north to Oregon in 1858.

== Military service ==
Drake served as an officer in both the 1st Oregon Cavalry and 1st Oregon Infantry volunteer regiments during the Civil War. When the American Civil War began, he volunteered for service in the United States Army. On November 29, 1861, Drake was commissioned as a first lieutenant in the 1st Oregon Cavalry. He was quickly promoted to captain, taking command of the cavalry regiment's D Company.

Drake and several other cavalry officers led lengthy explorations through eastern Oregon, northern Nevada, and southwestern Idaho searching for Indian raiders. Most of these patrols were unsuccessful in finding hostile Indians. However, Drake was involved in several minor skirmishes.

In May 1864, Drake was leading several companies of cavalrymen in the upper Crooked River area of eastern Oregon. The expedition was in response to Chief Paulina's raids on settlers and rival Indians in that region. Late in the evening of May 17, Warm Springs Indian scouts working with the 1st Oregon Cavalry found Chief Paulina's camp about twelve miles from Drake's camp, a site that later became Camp Maury. Before dawn the next morning a small group of soldiers and Warm Springs Indian scouts led by Lieutenant Stephen Watson attacked Paulina's camp from three sides. Chief Paulina and his men quickly retreated to a rocky cliff. In the ensuing battle, Lieutenant Watson, two soldiers, and several Indian scouts were killed. Before Drake's main force could reach the site of the battle, Paulina escaped leaving behind three dead.

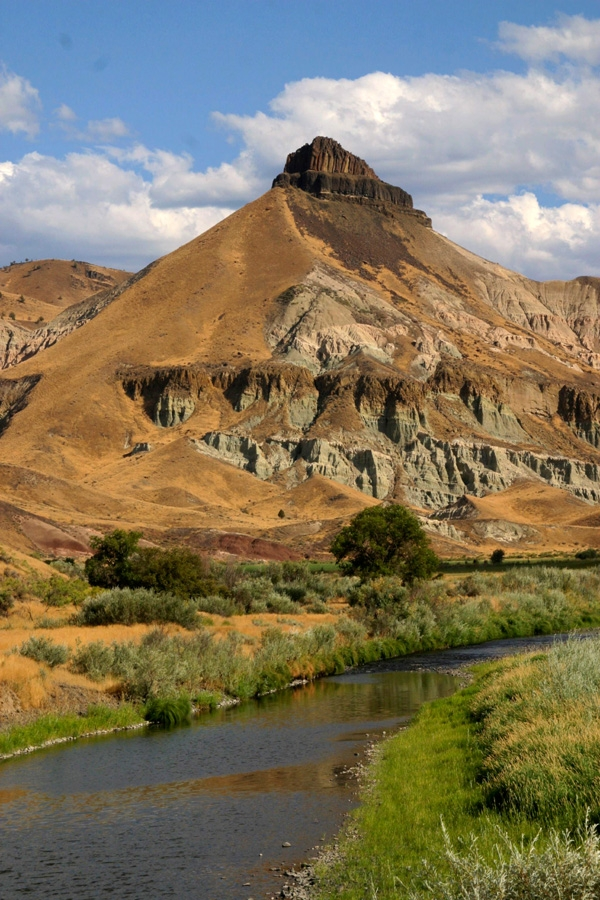
Sheep Rock in John Day Fossil Beds

During an expedition to resupply Army posts in eastern Oregon, Drake discovered fossilized bones in the hills southwest of Sheep Rock in the upper John Day basin. On July 19, 1864, Drake wrote to Thomas Condon about his discovery. On his way back to Fort Dalles, Drake loaded empty wagons with fossils to deliver to Condon. Condon, a pastor living at Fort Dalles, had an active interest in the natural sciences. Based on Drake's directions, Condon explored the area that is now the John Day Fossil Beds National Monument.

In late 1864, Drake was promoted to lieutenant colonel and transferred to the newly established 1st Oregon Infantry as the regiment's second highest-ranking officer. While some detachments of the 1st Oregon Infantry occasionally skirmished with hostile Indian bands, most companies spent their time in garrison duty at small posts in eastern Oregon, southeast Washington, and southern Idaho. They protected immigrant trails and escorted wagon trains from Fort Boise to the Willamette Valley. Two companies escorted survey parties; and another, led by Captain Franklin B. Sprague, constructed a road in southwestern Oregon.

In the fall of 1865, Drake's regiment was planning a winter campaign against the Indians in eastern Oregon. However, the end of the Civil War in the east had freed up many regular officers for duty in the west. As a result, most of the volunteer officers and men of the 1st Oregon Infantry regiment were released from service in November, so the planned winter campaign never got started. Drake was mustered out of the Army a month later, in December 1865.

== Later career ==
After leaving the Army, Drake became the purchasing agent for the Oregon Railway and Navigation Company. He worked for the company in that capacity for 17 years. Drake built three homes in the Portland area. He died in Portland on December 11, 1913.

== Legacy ==
There are two mountains in Oregon named after Colonel Drake. Drake Peak in Lake County has an elevation of 8,407 feet (2,562 m). There is also a smaller mountain, Drake Butte, located in the Maury Mountains in Crook County that is named in his honor. In addition, Drake deserves credit for finding and recording the location of the extensive fossil beds that are now protected in the John Day Fossil Beds National Monument.

During his 1864 campaign against the Snake Indians, Drake kept a journal describing Army operation in eastern Oregon. In 1906, Drake wrote an article entitled The Oregon Cavalry; however, his article was not immediately published. The Oregon Historical Society eventually published the article in the Oregon Historical Quarterly in 1964.

Drake's records from his military service along with his journal describing the Army's 1864 campaign against the Snake Indians are held by the Oregon Historical Society Research Library. The library also has Drake's personal letters, legal papers, private account books, business correspondence for the Oregon Railway and Navigation Company, and receipts for the Portland Board of Trade.
