= Lists of American Civil War units by state =

This is a list of American Civil War units, consisting of those established as federally organized units as well as units raised by individual states and territories. Many states had soldiers and units fighting for both the United States (Union Army) and the Confederate States (Confederate States Army). The border states had both Confederate and Union units, and in many of the Confederate states Union forces organized Union units from individuals who swore loyalty to the United States.

== United States ==
=== Federal organized ===
- United States Colored Troops
- United States Regular Army
- United States Volunteers
- District of Columbia

=== State forces ===
- Alabama
- Arkansas
- California
- Connecticut
- Delaware
- Florida
- Georgia
- Illinois
- Indiana
- Iowa
- Kansas
- Kentucky
- Louisiana
- Maine
- Maryland
- Massachusetts
- Michigan
- Minnesota
- Mississippi
- Missouri
- Nevada
- New Hampshire
- New Jersey
- New York
- North Carolina
- Ohio
- Oregon
- Pennsylvania
- Rhode Island
- South Carolina
- Tennessee
- Texas
- Vermont
- Virginia
- West Virginia
- Wisconsin

=== Territories ===
- Colorado Territory
- Dakota Territory
- Indian Territory (Confederacy)
- Nebraska Territory
- New Mexico Territory
- Washington Territory
- Utah Territory

== Confederate States ==
=== Confederate organized ===
- Confederate States Army units

=== State forces ===
- Alabama
- Arkansas
- California
- Florida
- Georgia
- Kentucky
- Louisiana
- Maryland
- Mississippi
- Missouri
- North Carolina
- South Carolina
- Tennessee
- Texas
- Virginia
- West Virginia

=== Territories ===
- Arizona Territory
- Indian Territory (also known as Oklahoma)
