= William V. Rinehart =

American soldier who served as a Union Army officer

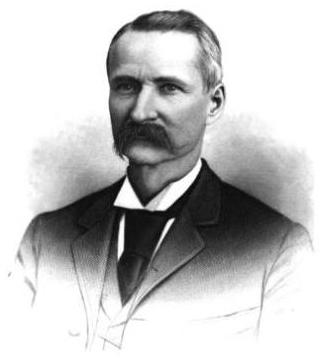
- Rinehart in 1890

Member of the Washington Senate from the 19th district
- In office November 6, 1889 – January 7, 1891
- Preceded by: Constituency established
- Succeeded by: L. F. Thompson

Personal details
- Born: 28 December 1835 Clarks Hill, Indiana, U.S.
- Died: 16 October 1918 (aged 82) Seattle, Washington, U.S.
- Party: Republican
- Occupation: Indian agent and businessman

Military service
- Allegiance: United States
- Branch/service: Union Army
- Years of service: 1856; 1862–1866
- Rank: Major
- Unit: 1st Oregon Cavalry; 1st Oregon Infantry
- Commands: Fort Klamath
- Battles/wars: Rogue River Wars and American Civil War

William Vance Rinehart (28 December 1835 – 16 October 1918) was an American soldier who served as a Union Army officer in both the 1st Oregon Volunteer Cavalry Regiment and 1st Oregon Volunteer Infantry Regiment during the American Civil War. He was later appointed as Indian agent at the Malheur Indian Reservation in eastern Oregon. Rinehart then moved to Seattle, Washington where he engaged in business and was active in state and local politics. He was elected to Washington state's first legislature, serving as a state senator from 1889 through 1890.

== Early life ==
Rinehart was born on 28 December 1835 in Clarks Hill, Indiana. He was raised on farm and attended Farmer's Institute, a Quaker school near Lafayette, Indiana. Rinehart migrated to California in 1854, driving an ox team across the North American plains. Once in California, he began gold mining near Downieville. He later moved north to the Crescent City area, where he continued to work as a miner.

In 1856, Rinehart moved to Josephine County, Oregon, where he began mining gold near Althouse Creek. When he arrived, the Rogue Indian War was on-going in southern Oregon. Rinehart joined the local militia and helped build Fort Briggs, a stockade used to protect Illinois Valley settlers from attack. In 1858, he ran for Josephine County clerk as a Republican, but was defeated. The following year, he took a job as a store clerk in Waldo, Oregon. As an active Republican, Rinehart supported Abraham Lincoln in 1860 presidential election.

== Civil War and early post-war period ==
A supporter of the Union cause, Rinehart joined the 1st Oregon Volunteer Cavalry Regiment in January 1862. He was commissioned as a first lieutenant and appointed regimental adjutant. He was promoted to captain in December 1863. As a captain, Rinehart commanded the volunteer cavalry regiment's Company A which was assigned to Fort Walla Walla in the Washington Territory.

When his enlistment period with the 1st Oregon Cavalry expired, Rinehart joined the 1st Oregon Volunteer Infantry Regiment, under the command of Colonel George B. Currey. In that unit, he served in southeastern Oregon, protecting wagon trains from Indian raiders. In the summer of 1865, Rinehart was promoted to Major. Shortly after his promotion, he took command of Fort Klamath. He remained in command until after the end of the Civil War when regular Army troops returned to Oregon to replace the militia volunteers. He was mustered out of the Army in 1866.

During the war, Rinehart had married Amanda E. Gaines of Yamhill County, Oregon. Eventually, they had three children together. After the war, Rinehart moved his family to Grant County, Oregon where he became a partner in a mercantile business. He then moved to Canyon City in 1868 and opened a general store there. The following year, he was appointed Canyon City's postmaster, a position he held for the next five years. During this period, he continued to work for Republican candidates throughout Grant County. In addition, he ran for a seat in the state legislature, but was defeated in a close election. In 1874, he moved to Los Angeles, California, but returned to Oregon two years later.

== Indian agent ==
In 1876, Rinehart was appointed Indian agent at the Malheur Indian Reservation, a position he held until the reservation was closed in 1882. The reservation was located in a remote area of eastern Oregon, approximately fifty miles east of Fort Harney. It was occupied primarily by Northern Paiute people.

Rinehart replaced Samuel B. Parrish, who was well respected by the Native American people living on the reservation. In contrast to Parrish's administration, Rinehart was in continuous conflict with the Native Americans living on the reservation from the time he arrived. According to Sarah Winnemucca, he required the native residents to turn their crops over to the government and then issued government rations to them. This often left reservation farmers with less food than they produced. Two senior chiefs on the reservation, Egan and Oytes, also complained that Rinehart illegally sold liquor to reservation residents. When white settlers began grazing their livestock on reservation lands, Rinehart made no effort to evict them. He even allowed one rancher to cut timber on the reservation without requiring any payment.

Rinehart's harsh policies may have contributed to the decision by local Paiutes to join the Bannock rebellion in 1878. When the uprising reached the Malheur reservation, Rinehart retreated to Canyon City where he helped organize the town's defenses.

After the conflict ended, some of the Paiute and Bannock prisoners were interned on the Malheur reservation under Rinehart's charge. Eventually, all of the Native Americans at the Malheur site transferred or moved to other reservations. Rinehart lost his position when the Malheur reservation was closed in 1882.

== Later life ==
After the Malheur Indian Reservation closed, Rinehart moved to Seattle. In Seattle, he sold hardware and then opened a grocery store. He later established a successful real estate business in the city. He was also active in civic affairs, serving in several city and state positions over the years. This included a term on the Seattle city council in 1884 and 1885. In November 1888, he was elected to Washington's territorial legislature, but Washington became a state before he took office so the election was voided.

In Washington state's first election in 1889, Rinehart was chosen as a state senator from District 19, representing King County. This allowed him to serve in the state's first legislative session that lasted from 6 November 1889 through 28 March 1890. During this legislature session, Rinehart helped write Washington's first code of laws. He also served in a special session called by Washington's governor in September 1890. In that session, legislative districts were reapportioned and the state House of Representatives and the state Senate were resized.

Rinehart did not seek re-election to the state Senate when his term expired at the end of 1890. After leaving the state Senate, Rinehart became Seattle's first commissioner of public works. Later, he returned to Seattle's city council, where he served for an additional ten years. This included several terms as president of the city council, a position that also served as acting mayor when the elected mayor was away from the city.

Rinehart was active in the Washington Pioneer Association, serving as president of that organization in 1896. He was also a prominent Mason and active in several civil war veterans groups for many years.

Rinehart died of pneumonia in Seattle on 16 October 1918. After his death, the Washington State Senate passed a resolution honoring him. There was also a memorial service held for him in the chamber of the Washington state House of Representatives on 4 February 1919.
