= Franklin Sprague =

Franklin Sprague may refer to:

- Frank J. Sprague (1857–1934), American naval officer and inventor
- Franklin B. Sprague (1825–1895), American military officer, businessman and judge
