= 1st Washington Territory Infantry Regiment =

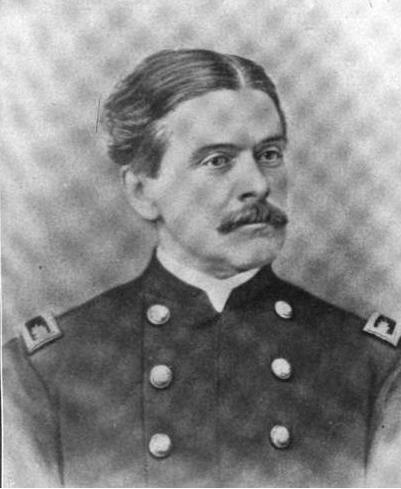
- Colonel J. Steinberger
- Active: October 1861 – December 1865
- Disbanded: December 1865
- Country: United States
- Allegiance: Union
- Branch: Infantry
- Size: 1,032
- Engagements: American Civil War; Snake War; Affair at the Grand Ronde Prairie

The 1st Regiment of Washington Territory Volunteer Infantry (or 1st Washington Territory Volunteers) was a unit of infantry raised by Washington Territory for service in the Union Army during the American Civil War.

== Service ==
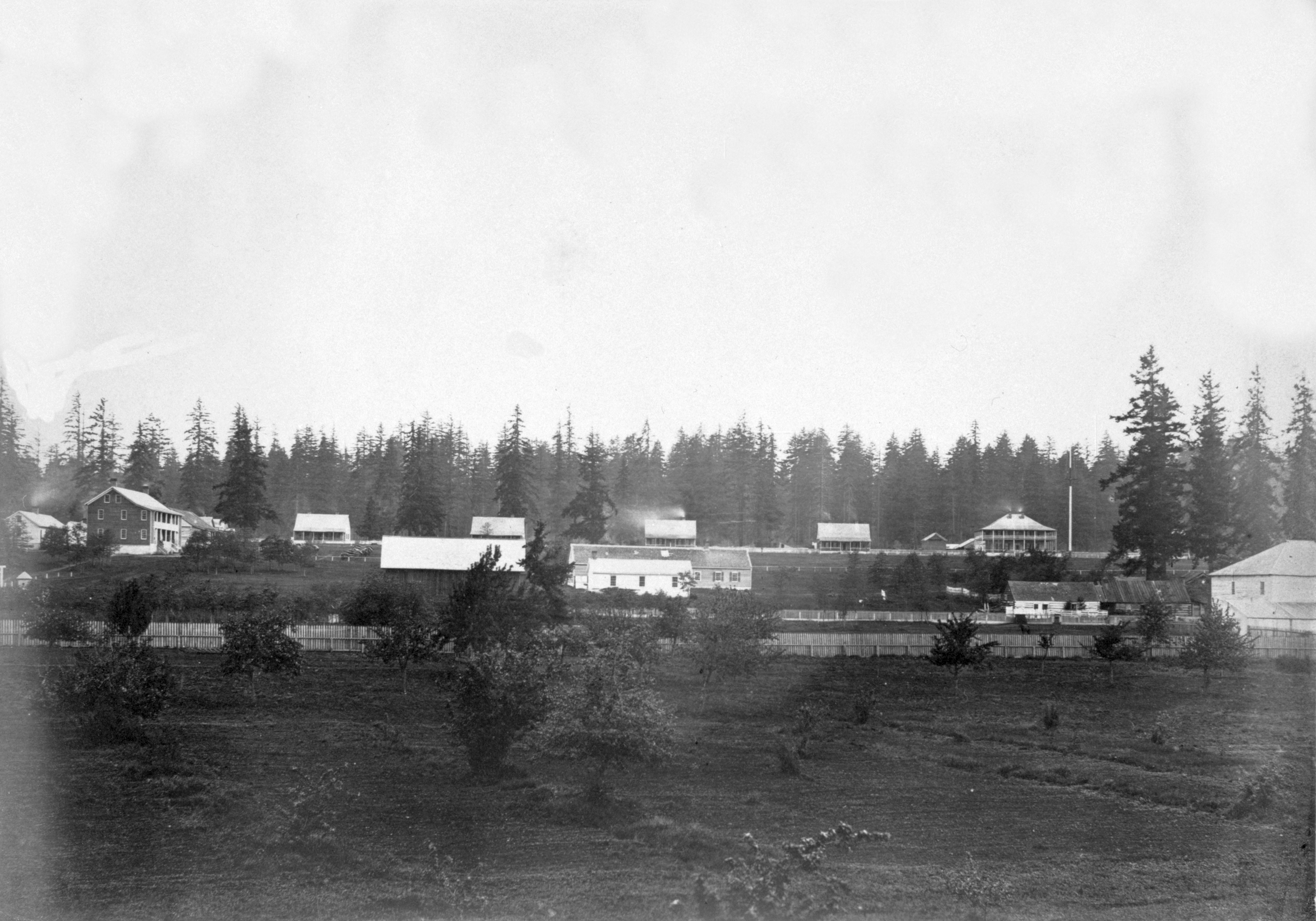
Fort Vancouver, Washington Territory

Under Colonel Justus Steinberger, organization for a three-year regiment began on 19 October 1861, with recruiting taking place within the territory as well as California. Company A, B, C and D were organized at Alcatraz Island, San Francisco, California, January to April, 1862. By May 1862, four companies had been mustered, with 17 officers and 317 men. Ten companies would eventually be raised, being mustered in from the end of March until December 1862. The majority of the volunteers would muster in at Alcatraz Island (Co A-E, G, and H), two others at Fort Vancouver (Co F and I) and one at Fort Steilacoom, Washington (Co K). The headquarters for the regiment was first at Fort Vancouver, and by July 1862 moved to Fort Walla Walla.

The companies, and/or detachments thereof, were stationed throughout the territories of Washington and Idaho, and in Oregon. They were used for the protection of miners and settlers, emigrant parties and other travellers along the roads from the east, and participated with the 1st Oregon Cavalry in expeditions against Shoshone, Snake, and other hostile Indian groups. They were also used to protect the Nez Perce, an ally of the United States, against those encroaching on their lands.

When the three years terms of service had expired for the earlier formed companies and the men were mustered out, the remaining three companies (Co E, H, and I) became the 1st Battalion on 7 March 1865. Co H would be consolidated with Co E in July, and was the last of the former Washington regiment to muster out of service in December.

As the companies were detached and participated in individual operations, their service records are best if listed separately:

Company A
Organized 21 March 1862, they were stationed at Fort Walla Walla. Originally being recruited for a two-year term, some of the men were leaving or reenlisting in early 1864. Once replaced by a company of the 1st Oregon Infantry, they left to be mustered out around February 1865.

Company B
Organized 1 April 1862, they were stationed at Fort Colville until 25 May 1864, when ordered to Fort Walla Walla. They remained here until receiving orders for their return to Fort Vancouver for discharge in the spring of 1865.

Company C
Organized 7 April 1862 and sent to Fort Colville for their term of service. They were mustered out at Fort Vancouver in April 1865.

Company D
Organized 12 April 1862, they were stationed at Fort Hoskins in Oregon by December 1862. Orders in March 1863 sent them to Fort Boise in Idaho Territory, where they remained stationed during their service.

Company E
Mustered in at Alcatraz, they were ordered on 19 October 1862 to Camp Lapwai (would fall within the bounds of the Idaho Territory when created the following March), near the Nez Perce Agency. Here, they were to build their encampment in what became Fort Lapwai. By June 1864, they would be stationed at Fort Vancouver. Co H would be consolidated with them in July 1865, and they would be the last of the Washington Territory volunteers to be mustered out, doing so on 11 Dec 1865.

Company F
Mustered at Fort Vancouver, the company was stationed at Fort Dalles, Oregon in 1863 and 1864. The majority of the troops were mustered out in July 1865.

Company G
One of the three Washington companies encamped at Fort Boise, Idaho Territory in March 1863, previously being at Fort Steilacoom.

Company H
Mustered at Alcatraz, they first encamped at Fort Walla Walla. On 25 May 1864, they transferred to Fort Vancouver. On 22 July 1865, they would be consolidated with Company E.

Company I
Encamped at Ft Vancouver in December 1862, it transferred to Fort Boise in March 1863. With Company H, the 1st Oregon Cavalry and Nez Perce Scouts, they made an expedition to Snake River in early June, 1863 to clear the area of the Snake Indians, who had been attacking travellers here for several years. As a band of emigrants, and their US Army escort, were due to pass through the Emigrant Road in August, additional troops were called on for protection. The pass safely made, Company I returned to Fort Boise, where it remained until its mustering out on 20 November 1865.

Company K
Mustered in at Fort Steilacoom, where they were stationed during their enlistment.

== Flags ==
In January of 1863, the territorial legislator gave the regiment $500 ($12,756 adjusted for inflation) to purchase a National flag and regimental flag. After the war the flags were lost.

Digital reconstruction of 37 star American flag flown over Fort Walla Walla

The regiment also had a large garrison flag that measured 16 feet long with 37 stars on its field. The flag was hand sewn and flown over Fort Walla Walla while the regiment was stationed there. After the war the flag was given to Mrs. P. B. Johnson. Forty years later she gave the flag to Governor Mead in Olympia.

== See also ==
- Washington in the American Civil War
- List of Washington Territory Civil War units
- Idaho in the American Civil War
- Oregon in the American Civil War
- Lists of American Civil War Regiments by State
