= List of District of Columbia units in the American Civil War =

The following is a list of Union Army units from the District of Columbia during the American Civil War. A total of 15,131 men fought in two regiments and four battalions of infantry and one regiment of cavalry. Other independent companies were raised during the war for local defense, including 33 companies of infantry and one company of cavalry raised from the District militia from April to July 1861.

DISTRICT OF COLUMBIA	NOTES
1st District of Columbia Cavalry Regiment	
1st District of Columbia Infantry Regiment	
2nd District of Columbia Infantry Regiment	
2nd District of Columbia Infantry Battalion	
3rd District of Columbia Infantry Battalion	
5th District of Columbia Infantry Battalion	
8th District of Columbia Infantry Battalion	
Owen's Cavalry Company (Militia)	
Boyd's Infantry Company (Militia)	
Callan's Infantry Company (Militia)	
Carrington's Infantry Company (Militia)	
Clarke's Infantry Company (Militia)	
Cross' Infantry Company (Militia)	
Degge's Infantry Company (Militia)	
Elder's Infantry Company (Militia)	
Ferguson's Infantry Company (Militia)	
Fletcher's Infantry Company (Militia)	
Foxwell's Infantry Company (Militia)	
Gerhart's Infantry Company (Militia)	
Goddard's Infantry Company (Militia)	
Grinnell's Infantry Company (Militia)	
Kelly's Infantry Company (Militia)	
King's Infantry Company (Militia)	
Knight's Infantry Company (Militia)	
Kyrzanowski's Infantry Company (Militia)	
Loeffler's Infantry Company (Militia)	
Mark's Infantry Company (Militia)	
Miller's Infantry Company (Militia)	
Morgan's Infantry Company (Militia)	
Morrison's Infantry Company (Militia)	
M'Blair's Infantry Company (Militia)	
M'Clelland's Infantry Company (Militia)	
M'Dermott's Infantry Company (Militia)	
M'Kim's Infantry Company (Militia)	
Nally's Infantry Company (Militia)	
Powell's Infantry Company (Militia)	
Rodier's Infantry Company (Militia)	
Rutherford's Infantry Company (Militia)	
Smead's Infantry Company (Militia)	
Thistleton's Infantry Company (Militia)	
Williams' Infantry Company (Militia)	

== See also ==
- Washington, D.C. in the American Civil War
- List of American Civil War units by state

== Bibliography ==
- Dyer, Frederick H. (1959). A Compendium of the War of the Rebellion. New York and London. Thomas Yoseloff, Publisher. LCCN 59-12963.
