= List of Nevada units in the American Civil War =

List of Nevada Civil War units

Before statehood, the military units were known as Nevada Territory battalions. Prior to recruiting being authorized, Nevadans enlisted into California units.

== Infantry ==
- 1st Battalion Nevada Infantry

== Cavalry ==
- 1st Battalion Nevada Cavalry

== See also ==
- Nevada in the American Civil War
- List of American Civil War units by state

== Notes/References ==
- Civil War Archive (Nevada)
