= Oregon Volunteers =

Oregon Volunteers may refer to:

- 1st Oregon Cavalry Regiment, who served in the U.S. Civil War, 1862–1866
- 1st Oregon Infantry Regiment, who served in the U.S. Civil War, 1864–1867
- 2nd Oregon Volunteer Infantry Regiment, who served in the Spanish–American War and Philippine–American War, 1898–1899
- Oregon Mounted Volunteers, who served in the Rogue River Wars and other conflicts with Native Americans in the American West, active in the 1850s
- Oregon Rangers, a short-lived militia, active 1844–1846
- Oregon Rifles, a short-lived militia, formed in 1847
- Regiment of Mounted Riflemen, later known as the 3rd Cavalry Regiment (United States), incorrectly (as they were regular army), when they marched to the Oregon Territory in 1849
