= Herschel Daugherty =

American television/film director and actor

- Born: Herschel Eldon Daugherty; October 27, 1910; Clarks Hill, Indiana, US
- Died: March 5, 1993 (aged 82); Encinitas, California, US
- Occupations: Television and film director, actor
- Years active: 1943–1975

Herschel Eldon Daugherty (October 27, 1910 – March 5, 1993) was an American television and film director and occasional actor.

== Early life and career ==
Born in Clarks Hill, Indiana, to Charles Emerson and Blanche Eracene Daugherty (né Feerer), Daugherty graduated from Whittier College in 1934 and was awarded a scholarship to the Pasadena Playhouse School of the Theater, where he later served as one of its associate directors. In 1942, Daugherty was signed by Warner Brothers as a dialogue director, in which capacity he served for roughly a decade before moving to TV as a full-fledged director. During that period, he also had a number of small acting roles, most of them uncredited. Speaking in 1979, he recalled, "I was in front of a camera just long enough to know I'd do best behind it. It's much easier to tell people what to do." Daugherty's own difficulties onscreen informed his approach to directing:

I like to think I was a coach. Something like Knute Rockne. I want to make it possible for actors to play over their heads, to desire to be better than ever before. I want to give them faith in themselves, to believe in themselves. [...] I never figured there was any point in being like DeMille or some of the others. I watched him tear a young actress apart one day. He had already destroyed her, but he kept going on and on. I realized then there's no way you can act when someone's yelling at you. I was determined that wasn't going to be my approach.

Some comments made in November 1956 by Piper Laurie, then a soon-to-be 25-year-old, studio-promoted starlet may be beneficial to find out what that approach was and how it differed from that of DeMille.

I'm not the most experienced actress in the world. I would like to be, and I found more attention given to my acting on "The Road That Led Afar" than in most of the pictures I've played. [...] In this role the directors have given me a sense of freedom in acting for the first time in my life. (Note: The additional director would be assistant director Richard Birnie.)

Regarding director Jean Negulesco, with whom he worked at both Warner Brothers and 20th Century Fox, Daugherty recalled:

Negulesco was a great artist, but he couldn't care less about acting. He let me handle all the actors and let me rehearse all the scenes. He told me, "You can do all the work so long as you give me the credit."

Actor Dale Robertson, who would work with both Daugherty and Negulesco on Take Care of My Little Girl (1951), is less charitable in his assessment of the film's nominal director:

Jean Negulesco was an overrated director. He had a dialogue coach who went on to become a really good director... Herschel Daugherty. [...] And Herschel was actually the one who was doing the directing, you know, and Negulesco was taking all the credit. [...] [Y]ou'd see him go over and whisper in Negulesco's ear. And then pretty soon, in a very loud voice, Negulesco would say, "I don't like this line. We're going to make it this way." And he says, "Now that makes more sense. Yes, we'll do it that way." But I never heard him come up with an original thought. It was always Herschel.

Daugherty went on to direct various episodes of popular television shows such as Gunsmoke (1955), Alfred Hitchcock Presents (1955), Crusader (1955), and Wagon Train, Rawhide (1959), Bonanza (1959), Thriller (1961–62), The Man from U.N.C.L.E. (1964), Star Trek (1966), The Time Tunnel (1966), Hawaii Five-O (1968), The Smith Family (1971–72), Emergency! (1972) and The Six Million Dollar Man (1974). In 1957, for his work on General Electric Theater's "The Road That Led Afar", Daugherty, along with assistant director Richard Birnie, won the Directors Guild of America Award; they also received an Emmy nomination, in the category of "Best Direction, Half Hour or Less." Two years later, Daugherty was nominated in essentially the same category (albeit a slightly more inclusive version), "Best Direction of a Single Program of a Dramatic Series (Less Than One Hour)," for GE Theatre's critically acclaimed adaptation of James Thurber's short story, "One is a Wanderer." In addition, Daugherty directed Millard Lampell's "No Hiding Place," one of the most impactful episodes of the much-praised but short-lived CBS series East Side/West/Side (1963–1964).

At least three notable screen debuts were made with Daugherty directing: Carol Lynley—in the 1958 Disney-produced semi-historical western, The Light in the Forest—as well as Gene Kelly and Gloria Grahame making their respective TV acting debuts. Kelly starred in the 1957 Schlitz Playhouse of the Stars adaptation of Flannery O'Connor's short story, "The Life You Save May Be Your Own," while Grahame and co-star Dick Shawn helped General Electric Theater ring in 1961 with the episode, "Don't Let it Throw You."

Daugherty's dialogue director credits include, among others, the 1947 psychological drama Possessed, such films noir as Passage to Marseille (1944), The Mask of Dimitrios (1944) and Mildred Pierce (1945), the well-received stage-to-screen adaptation Life with Father (1947), the 1946 musical biopic Night and Day and the 1949 musical comedy/Tinseltown parody It's a Great Feeling (1949).

Daugherty died on March 5, 1993, in Encinitas, California at the age of 82.

== Filmography ==
=== Dialogue Director ===
- Edge Of Darkness (1943)
- Passage to Marseille (1944)
- The Adventures Of Mark Twain (1944)
- The Mask of Dimitrios (1944)
- The Conspirators (1944)
- Mildred Pierce (1945)
- Night and Day (1946)
- Nobody Lives Forever (1946)
- Humoresque (1946)
- Possessed (1947)
- Life With Father (1947)
- That Hagen Girl (1947)
- April Showers (1948)
- The Woman in White (1948)
- John Loves Mary (1949)
- Look for the Silver Lining (1949)
- It's a Great Feeling (1949)
- On Moonlight Bay (1951)
- O. Henry's Full House (1952) (Uncredited, segment "The Last Leaf")
- My Pal Gus (1952) (Uncredited)
- How to Marry a Millionaire (1953) (Uncredited)
- The Veils of Bagdad (1953) (Uncredited)
- South Sea Woman (1953)
- The Glory Brigade (1953)
- Demetrius and the Gladiators (1954) (Uncredited)

=== Uncredited actor ===
Year	Title	Role
1949	Red, Hot and Blue	Laertes
1949	The Story of Seabiscuit	Reporter
1949	White Heat	Policeman
1950	Young Man with a Horn	Attendant
1950	Chain Lightning	Sergeant
1950	The Damned Don't Cry	Rewrite Man
1950	The Great Jewel Robber	Sgt. Tarrant
1950	Tea For Two	Theater Manager
1950	Where Danger Lives	Desk Clerk
1951	Lullaby of Broadway	Sidney

=== Director ===
TV series

Year	Title	Notes
1952	Biff Baker, U.S.A.	
1953	Chevron Theatre	1 Episode
1953–55	The Pepsi-Cola Playhouse	16 Episodes
1954–58	Studio 57	29 Episodes
1955	City Detective	3 Episodes
1955	The Jane Wyman Show	1 Episode
1955	Soldiers of Fortune	5 Episodes
1955-56	Star Stage	3 Episodes
1955-56	Crusader	6 Episodes
1955–62	General Electric Theater	36 Episodes
1956–62	Alfred Hitchcock Presents	24 Episodes
1957	Schlitz Playhouse of Stars	2 Episodes
1957	State Trooper	1 Episode
1957–59	The Joseph Cotten Show	3 Episodes
1957–64	Wagon Train	17 Episodes
1958	Buckskin	2 Episodes
1958	Cimarron City	2 Episodes
1958	Suspicion	2 Episodes
1959	Laramie	3 Episodes
1959	Lux Playhouse	1 Episode
1959–60	Markham	8 Episodes
1959–61	The Deputy	3 Episodes
1960	The Tall Man	3 Episodes
1960–61	Checkmate	5 Episodes
1961	The Magical World Of Disney	2 Episodes
1961	Westinghouse Playhouse	1 Episode
1961-62	Thriller	16 Episodes
1961-62	87th Precinct	2 Episodes
1962	Wide Country	1 Episode
1962–63	Alcoa Theatre	2 Episodes
1962–64	The Virginian	3 Episodes
1963	Channing	1 Episode
1963	Kraft Mystery Theater	1 Episode
1963	The Alfred Hitchcock Hour	3 Episodes
1963–64	East Side/West Side	2 Episodes
1964	Bob Hope Presents the Chrysler Theatre	1 Episode
1964	Mr. Novak	1 Episode
1964	Mr. Broadway	4 Episodes
1964–65	Rawhide	2 Episodes
1965	For The People	1 Episode
1965	The Doctors and The Nurses	1 Episode
1965	The Man from U.N.C.L.E.	1 Episode
1965	The Legend Of Jesse James	2 Episodes
1965	The Wackiest Ship in the Army	1 Episode
1965–66	Dr. Kildare	19 Episodes
1966	Seaway	2 Episodes
1966	The Girl from U.N.C.L.E.	1 Episode
1966	Shane	1 Episode
1966	T.H.E. Cat	1 Episode
1967	Felony Squad	1 Episode
1967	Mission: Impossible	1 Episode
1967	Custer	2 Episodes
1967	The Time Tunnel	2 Episodes
1967-68	Cimarron Strip	3 Episodes
1967-68	The Rat Patrol	6 Episodes
1967–69	Star Trek	2 Episodes
1968	It Takes a Thief	1 Episode
1968-69	Gunsmoke	2 Episodes
1968-69	Hawaii Five-O	5 Episodes
1969	The F.B.I.	1 Episode
1969-70	Bracken's World	6 Episodes
1969-70	The High Chaparral	2 Episodes
1969–72	Bonanza	11 Episodes
1970	Here Come the Brides	1 Episode
1970–72	Marcus Welby, M.D.	5 Episodes
1971–72	The Smith Family	39 Episodes
1972	Emergency!	2 Episodes
1972	Hec Ramsey	1 Episode
1973	Cannon	1 Episode
1973	Circle Of Fear	1 Episode
1974	Apple's Way	2 Episodes
1974	Banacek	1 Episode
1974	Paper Moon	1 Episode
1974	The Six Million Dollar Man	1 Episode
1975	Petrocelli	1 Episode
1975	Three For The Road	1 Episode
1975	Police Woman	2 Episodes

Feature film

- The Light in the Forest (1958)
- The Raiders (1963)
- El Magnifico Extranjero (1966)

TV movies

- The Slowest Gun in the West (1960)
- Winchester '73 (1967)
- The Victim (1972)
- She Cried Murder (1973)
- Twice in a Lifetime (1974)
