= 1st Nevada Infantry Battalion =

- Active: 24 December 1864 – 23 December 1865
- Country: United States of America
- Allegiance: Union
- Branch: Army
- Type: infantry
- Engagements: American Civil War; Owens Valley Indian War (Co.C)

The 1st Nevada Infantry Battalion was an infantry unit raised for service in the Union Army during the American Civil War.

Authorization was given to raise a full regiment. Charles A. Sumner was commissioned a colonel with A. W. Briggs as lieutenant colonel and John G. Paul as major. The unit, however, never reached full regimental strength, and these officers were not mustered into service. Three companies were organized at Fort Churchill, Nevada Territory, beginning in 1863.

== Organization ==
Company	Captain	Enlisted Strength	Assignment
Company A	M. R. Hassett (18 Jan 1865 resigned); William Wallace	119	On duty at Fort Churchill. Involved in expedition to Mud Lake in 1865.
Company B	George A. Thurston	126	On duty at Fort Churchill until July 28, 1864. Transferred to Fort Ruby. Involved in a skirmish at Austin.
Company C	John G. Kelly	124	On duty at Fort Churchill until Dec 7, 1864. Transferred to Camp Independence, CA.

== See also ==
- Nevada in the American Civil War
- List of Nevada units in the American Civil War
