= Nevada in the American Civil War =

Nevada's entry into statehood in the United States on October 31, 1864, in the midst of the American Civil War, was expedited by Union sympathizers in order to ensure the state's participation in the 1864 presidential election in support of President Abraham Lincoln. Thus Nevada became one of only two states admitted to the Union during the war (the other being West Virginia) and earned the nickname that appears on the Nevada state flag today: "Battle Born".

Because its population at statehood was less than 40,000, Nevada was only able to muster 1,200 men to fight for the Union Army, but Confederate forces never posed any serious threat of territorial seizure, and Nevada remained firmly in Union control for the duration of the war. Largely isolated from the major theaters of the conflict, Nevada nonetheless served as an important target for political and economic strategists before and after gaining statehood. Its main contribution to the cause came from its burgeoning mining industry: at least $400 million in silver ore from the Comstock Lode was used to finance the federal war effort. In addition, the state hosted a number of Union military posts.

== Admission into statehood ==
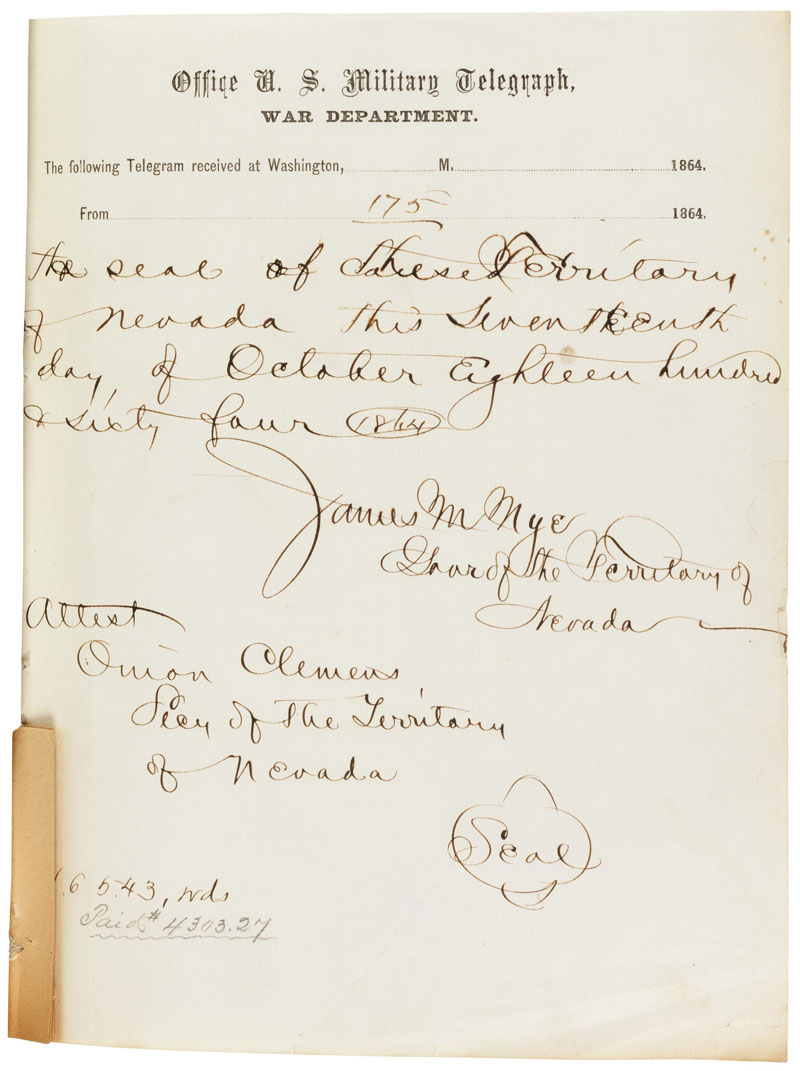
Signature page for the telegraph transmission of the first Nevada State Constitution, October 1864. The handwritten annotation at the bottom shows the word count (16,543) and cost ($4303.27).

Prior to the Civil War, the geographic area that makes up present-day Nevada belonged to several different U.S. territories. The region had long held economic ties to northern industry and financing, especially after the discovery of gold and silver in the eastern Sierra Nevada in the late 1850s, and was populated predominantly by secular Unionists who opposed slavery and sought some sort of territorial incorporation to bolster the area's economic growth: either through annexation by California or organization as an independent territory. Many early Nevadans also sought political segregation from Mormons living to the east, with whom they were often engaged in ideological conflict.

The majority of what is now Nevada was separated from the Territory of Utah and formally organized as the Territory of Nevada on March 2, 1861, just as southern states began seceding from the Union and joining the Confederacy.

The Nevada Territory was short-lived, however, as its entry into full statehood in the United States was expedited in 1864. President Abraham Lincoln sought the support of an additional Northern state that would presumably vote for his re-election and help force pro-Northern ideas into new amendments to the United States Constitution, specifically the 13th Amendment, by which he proposed to abolish slavery. Union sympathizers were so eager to gain statehood for Nevada that they rushed to send the entire state constitution by telegraph to the United States Congress before the 1864 presidential election since they did not believe that sending it by train would guarantee its arrival on time. The constitution was sent October 26–27, 1864, less than two weeks before the election on November 8. The transmission took two days; it consisted of 16,543 words and cost $4303.27 (Note: The National Archives press release states that the cost was $4313.27, but the amount $4303.27 is actually written on the document.) (equivalent to $88,583 in 2025) to send. It was, at the time, the longest telegraph transmission ever made, a record it held for seventeen years until a copy of the 118,000-word Revised Version of the New Testament was sent by telegraph on May 22, 1881.

Lincoln and Congress moved quickly to approve the constitution and Nevada was officially admitted to the Union as the 36th state on October 31, 1864. It had fewer than 40,000 inhabitants when it gained statehood, far fewer than the population at statehood of any other state.

== Nevada volunteers ==
The Nevada volunteer group was made of residents from Carson City, Virginia City, Reno, and Dayton. This group was originally considered to be a part of the California volunteer group but, was actually organized, ran, and implemented in Carson City by Charles D. Douglas. The officers and members of the volunteer group were from the general public and used their own firearms while in battle. Most of the officers were veterans of the Mexican American War and many held elected public positions prior to serving in the volunteer forces. As the volunteer groups began to grow and become larger, more training was implemented. In 1863 at the outpost of Fort Churchill, California was tasked with training Nevada Volunteers to be officers adequate to the standards of the United States Army. For the most part, these groups served without pay, but on occasion would reserve little bits of money from local government or by the local businesses, sometimes both. The work these volunteers did was out of gratitude and loyalty to the Union they had joined during the time of its establishment. In total, Nevada sent 1,200 men to fight for the Union. In May 1863, Nevada raised the 1st Battalion Nevada Volunteer Cavalry. In the summer of 1864, a battalion of infantry, the 1st Battalion Nevada Volunteer Infantry was mustered in. The adjutant-general of Nevada reported that since the beginning of the Civil War, 34 officers and 1,158 enlisted men had voluntarily enlisted in the service of the United States from Nevada. These troops were not used against the southern armies, but instead protected the central overland route and settlements on the frontier from Indians. With the units of California Volunteers engaged in the same service, they made incursions into Indian country, exploring large sections of territory which had never been entered by American forces, and had frequent skirmishes with the Indians. The Nevada volunteer group and all of the forts, outposts, training grounds and other military areas can be traced through history to today's current Army and Air National Guard in Nevada.

== Sanitary Commission ==
During the time of the Civil War, the Nation lacked an organization to help administer aid and help the wounded or sick soldiers. Similar to the role the Red Cross played later in history, The Sanitary Commission sought to find a way to help the wounded, sick and disabled soldiers of the war. This Commission was started in 1862 after the war had already begun and was disembodied in 1865. The Sanitary Commission in Nevada was able to raise the most per capita amount of money in the union, to the looks of US$163,581.07 (equivalent to about $3,441,000 in 2025). This wasn't only money donated. The commission of volunteers created the Sanitary fund, which got its funding from subscriptions or by any other way people saw fit to assist the cause. They were able to create excitement around the idea and generate revenue by doing different promotional acts. One such promotional idea in the end raised around US$10,650 (equivalent to about $224,000 in 2025), being the "Sanitary Sack of Flour," which brought a lot of revenue in from just one event. The event brought both the Democratic and Republican parties together to help raise money for the war. It started out as a wager between the owner of a grocery store (Reuel Gridley, Democrat) and the collector of internal revenue for Nevada Dr. H. S. Herrick, Republican. The loser of the wager had to carry a fifty-pound sack of flour from Clifton to Austin (about one mile) and if the loser was a Republican he had to march to "Dixie" and if Democrat he had to march to "John Brown's Body." Dr. H. S. Herrick won the wager and in turn the southern sympathizer marched through the streets carrying the flour sack, decorated with American flags and painted red white and blue. This drew curious crowds of many people and ended up bringing a lot of attention and money towards the commission. Through the duration of the Sanitary Fund, they in total collected around US$275,000 (equivalent to about $5,784,000 in 2025) to aid the sick and wounded soldiers. Although not everyone in Nevada was for joining the Union, this helped to bring the state together to focus its efforts on an issue that both sides could see was good and beneficial for the overall well-being of the nation. Also, this program helped to focus the attention of the nation on the generosity and community of the people living in Nevada.

== Comstock Lode ==
However, Nevada's main contribution to the war was the Comstock Lode, whose silver totaling $400 million financed the Union war effort to defeat the southern states. A common belief is that Nevada achieved early statehood due to its silver, but its admission to the Union was much more influenced by political concerns, not economic.

Confederate sympathizers in Nevada were not unheard of during the war; in fact, of the Pacific Coast states, none had more southern supporters. In Virginia City, in particular, sentiment towards the warring sides was split evenly. However, in strict military fashion, any strong sentiment that was pro-Confederate was struck down as Union army soldiers arrested the sympathizers and jailed them at Fort Churchill. One of the few times a Confederate flag was flown in the state was at a stone saloon, and defended at gunpoint by one of the saloon's owners until the owner's partner convinced him to change his Palmetto flag to the United States flag before troops from Fort Churchill forced the matter. This perhaps contributed to the commander of Fort Churchill feeling additional paranoia about pro-Confederate sympathies in mining camps, and throughout the war Nevada was under martial law.

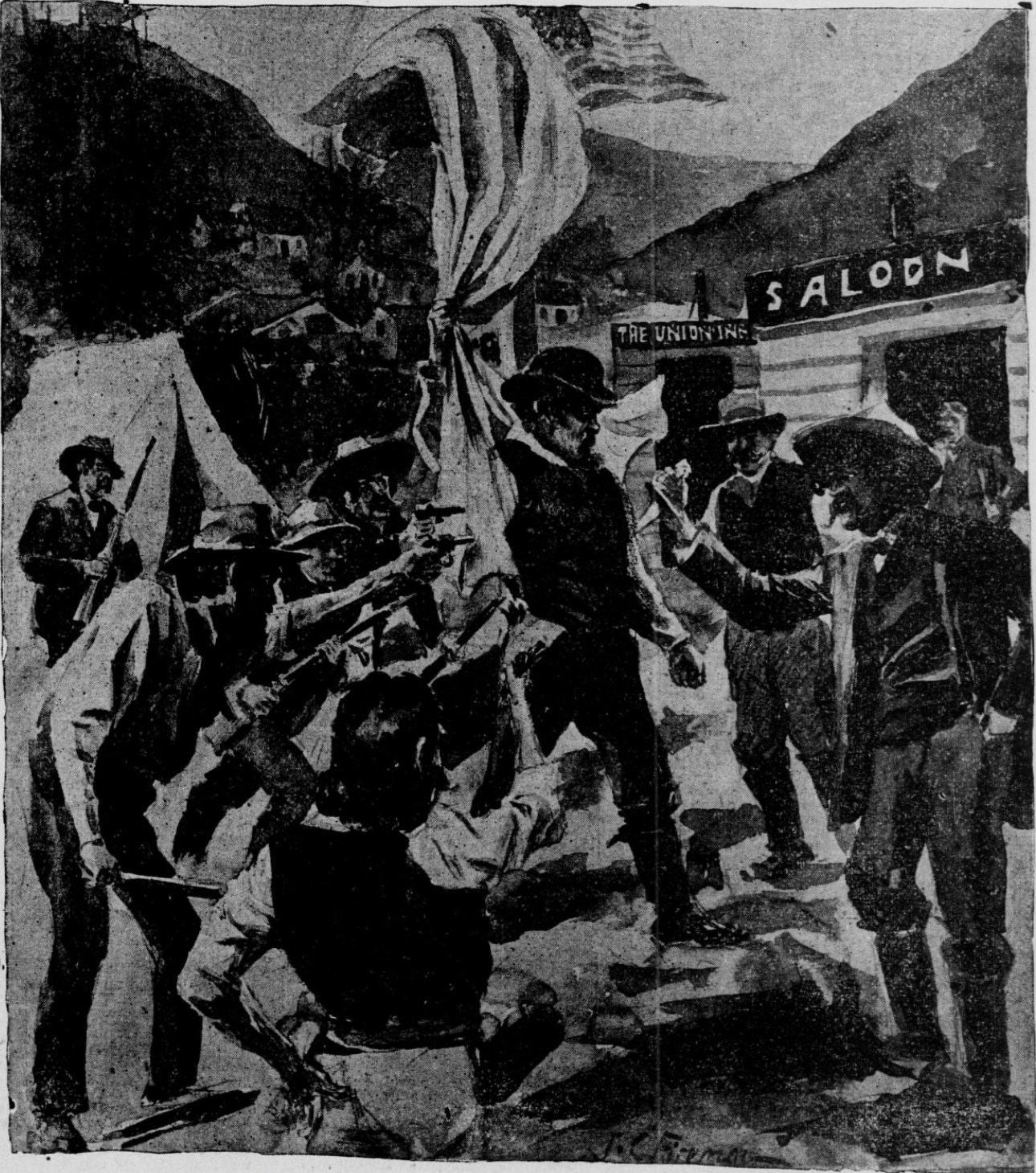
Mr. Gardner taking down the Palmetto flag in Carson City, 1861

In June 1861, Confederate sympathizers attempted to raised a Confederate flag in Carson City but were violently resisted. In August, a group of ladies from the city came together to make a palmetto flag. The flag was described as "...white flag with the palmetto tree embroidered on it..." Upon hearing news of it being raised from the local flagpole a unionist named Mr. Gardner made it his mission to take it down. He walked over to the flag-staff and passed though the crowd which formed around it. When he got closer to the pole he noticed the American flag was still on it; he then grabbed the palmetto flag and wrapped it around his hand. As soon as he grabbed it, three people stepped from the crowd armed with pistols and bowie knives, with one of them repeatedly slashing him across his body. Another one pulled out their gun and placed it on Mr. Gardner's heart and pulled the trigger, with the bullet luckily missing. Soon United States Marshal John Blackburn rushed from the crowd to help Mr. Gardner; he tried to put and end to the fighting but a large Bowie knife was pushed into his heart killing him on the spot. At the same time Mr. Gardner was hit over the head which knocked him out. He surprisingly survived the whole event and made a full recovery. The Governor of the Territory later gave him a commission as 2nd Lieut. of company A of the 1st Battalion Nevada Volunteer Cavalry. One of the men who killed Blackburn named Mayfield was sentenced to be hung in February 1862.

One particularly pro-Union organization was the Virginia City Fire Department. Many of them were originally from New York and had strong feelings for the New York Fire Zouaves they had known when they lived back east. When news arrived of the Union defeat at the First Battle of Bull Run, with the New York Fire Zouaves in particular suffering heavy casualties, it was determined by the Virginia City firemen that they would book no celebrations by southern sympathizers, and they physically harassed anyone of them they met that day.

== Military posts in Nevada during the Civil War ==
- Mormon Station (1849–1910)
- Fort Churchill (1860–1869)
- Camp Schell (1860–1862)
  - Fort Schellbourne (1862–1869)
- Camp Nye (1861–1865) (Note: A depot for California Volunteers and, after 1864, Nevada Volunteers. Located in the Washoe Valley five miles north of Carson City.)
- Fort Ruby (1862–1869)
- Camp Smoke Creek (1862–1864) (Note: Near Robbers Roost, Nevada, a temporary Army post that was intermittently occupied. Located near the Smoke Creek Depot (or Smoke Creek Station) on the Honey Lake stage route. The site is not shown on most maps, but it was located five miles from the state line west of Smoke Creek Desert and north of the Pyramid Lake Indian Reservation.)
- Camp Dun Glen (1863, 1865–1866) (Note: This camp was established at the request of the citizens of Dun Glen to protect them from attacks by the Snake Indians.)
- Fort Trinity, 1863–1864 (Note: Eightmile, Nevada. Located at the Goshute Indian Reservation between Tippett and the state line. Originally called Eight Mile Station, it was frequently occupied by troops from Fort Ruby.)
- Antelope Station, 1864 (Note: At Little Antelope Mountain, it was an important stage station located about 40 miles west of Ely, Nevada in operation during the 1860s and 1870s. Garrisoned by California Volunteers in 1864.)
- Fort Baker, 1864
- Deep Creek Station, 1864 (Note: A stage station near Eightmile, Nevada that was garrisoned by the California Volunteers in 1864. Located on the state line three miles northwest of Fort Trinity.)
- Quinn River Camp, 1865
  - Fort McDermitt, 1865–1889
- Camp McGarry, 1865–1868.
- Camp McKee, 1865–1866 (Note: Near Gerlach, Nevada. Originally called Detachment at Granite Creek, the Army occupied the Granite Creek Station after Indians burned it and killed its employees. Located north of town and east of Granite Mountain.)
- Camp Overend, 1865 (Note: A temporary Army post that lasted only a few days, located south of Golconda, Nevada at Summit Springs.)

== See also ==
- History of Nevada
