= Clarks Hill, Indiana =

- Town
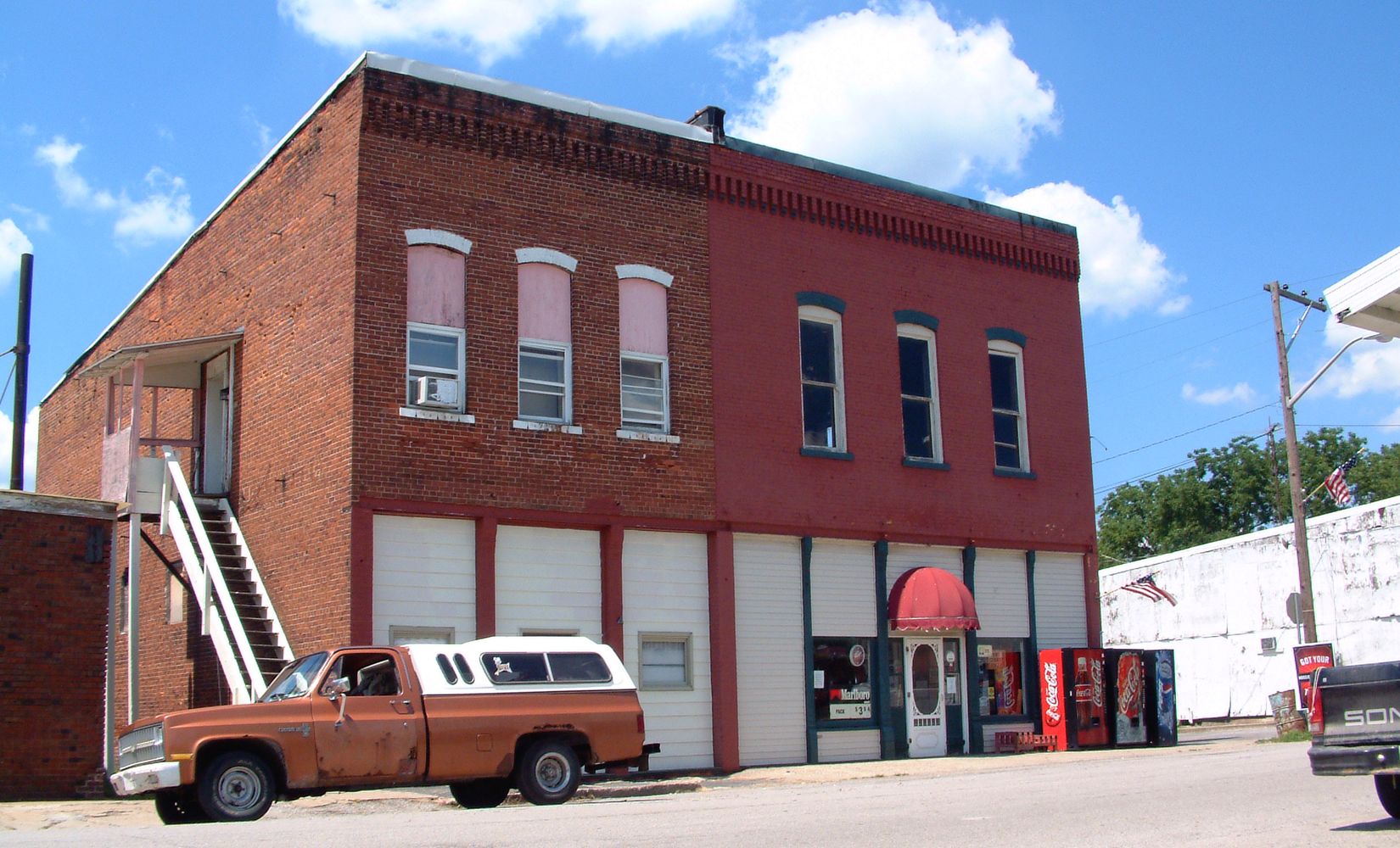
- Storefronts at the corner of White and Division streets.

- Location of Clarks Hill in Tippecanoe County, Indiana.
- Coordinates: 40°14′55″N 86°43′27″W
- Country: United States
- State: Indiana
- County: Tippecanoe
- Township: Lauramie

Area
  - Total: 0.27 sq mi (0.71 km^{2})
  - Land: 0.27 sq mi (0.71 km^{2})
  - Water: 0 sq mi (0.00 km^{2})
- Elevation: 827 ft (252 m)

Population (2020)
  - Total: 600
  - Density: 2,202.2/sq mi (850.28/km^{2})
- Time zone: UTC-5 (Eastern (EST))
  - Summer (DST): UTC-4 (EDT)
- ZIP code: 47930
- Area code: 765
- FIPS code: 18-12898
- GNIS feature ID: 2396648
- Website: townofclarkshillin.com

Clarks Hill is a town in Lauramie Township, Tippecanoe County, in the U.S. state of Indiana. As of the 2020 census, Clarks Hill had a population of 600.

It is part of the Lafayette, Indiana Metropolitan Statistical Area.

== History ==
The post office at Clarks Hill has been in operation since 1853.

== Geography ==
According to the 2010 census, Clarks Hill has a total area of 0.27 square miles (0.70 km^{2}), all land.

== Demographics ==
Historical population
Census	Pop.	Note	%±
1900	539		—
1910	463		−14.1%
1920	435		−6.0%
1930	428		−1.6%
1940	381		−11.0%
1950	493		29.4%
1960	654		32.7%
1970	741		13.3%
1980	653		−11.9%
1990	716		9.6%
2000	680		−5.0%
2010	611		−10.1%
2020	600		−1.8%
U.S. Decennial Census

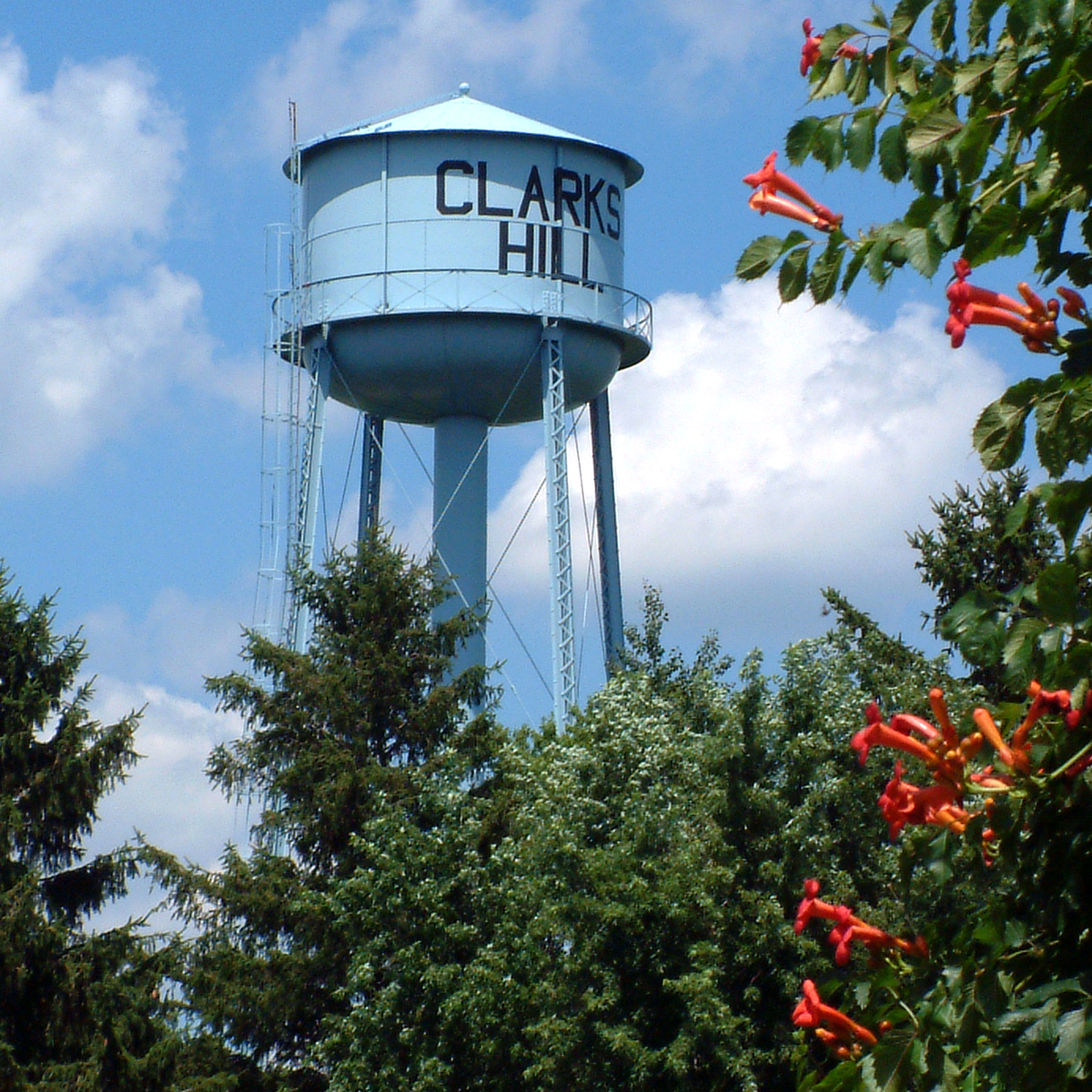
The Clarks Hill water tower.

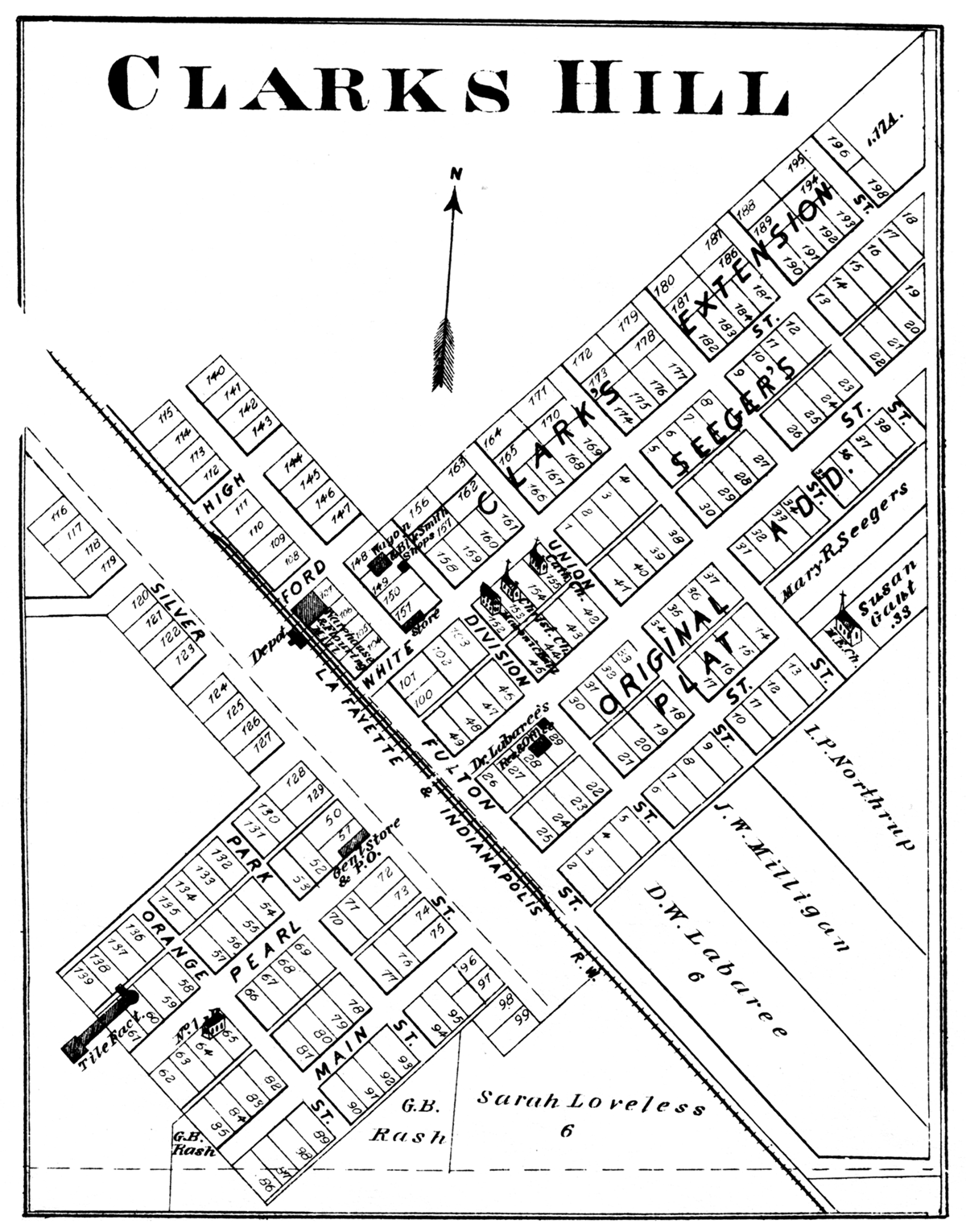
Clarks Hill in 1878.

=== 2010 census ===
As of the census of 2010, there were 611 people, 230 households, and 164 families living in the town. The population density was 2,263.0 inhabitants per square mile (873.7/km^{2}). There were 270 housing units at an average density of 1,000.0 per square mile (386.1/km^{2}). The racial makeup of the town was 97.9% White, 0.2% African American, 0.3% Native American, and 1.6% from two or more races. Hispanic or Latino of any race were 1.1% of the population.

There were 230 households, of which 40.4% had children under the age of 18 living with them, 51.3% were married couples living together, 14.3% had a female householder with no husband present, 5.7% had a male householder with no wife present, and 28.7% were non-families. 24.8% of all households were made up of individuals, and 5.6% had someone living alone who was 65 years of age or older. The average household size was 2.66 and the average family size was 3.16.

The median age in the town was 36.2 years. 29.3% of residents were under the age of 18; 8.3% were between the ages of 18 and 24; 26.3% were from 25 to 44; 26% were from 45 to 64; and 10% were 65 years of age or older. The gender makeup of the town was 50.6% male and 49.4% female.

=== 2000 census ===
As of the census of 2000, there were 680 people, 241 households, and 188 families living in the town. The population density was 2,474.5 inhabitants per square mile (955.4/km^{2}). There were 260 housing units at an average density of 946.1 per square mile (365.3/km^{2}). The racial makeup of the town was 92.09% White, 6.15% African American, 0.44% Native American, 0.15% Asian, 0.74% from other races, and 0.44% from two or more races. Hispanic or Latino of any race were 1.03% of the population.

There were 241 households, out of which 44.4% had children under the age of 18 living with them, 60.2% were married couples living together, 12.9% had a female householder with no husband present, and 21.6% were non-families. 17.8% of all households were made up of individuals, and 7.9% had someone living alone who was 65 years of age or older. The average household size was 2.82 and the average family size was 3.18.

In the town, the population was spread out, with 33.1% under the age of 18, 8.8% from 18 to 24, 30.9% from 25 to 44, 19.1% from 45 to 64, and 8.1% who were 65 years of age or older. The median age was 31 years. For every 100 females, there were 91.0 males. For every 100 females age 18 and over, there were 97.8 males.

The median income for a household in the town was $35,893, and the median income for a family was $40,268. Males had a median income of $30,208 versus $22,368 for females. The per capita income for the town was $12,773. About 5.1% of families and 10.1% of the population were below the poverty line, including 14.9% of those under age 18 and 6.1% of those age 65 or over.

== Education ==
It is in the Tippecanoe School Corporation. Residents are zoned to James Cole Elementary School, Wainwright Middle School, and McCutcheon High School.

== Notable people ==
- Herschel Daugherty (1910–1993), film and television director, was born in Clarks Hill.
- William V. Rinehart (1835–1918), Washington state legislator and military officer, was born in Clarks Hill.
