= Fort Lapwai =

Historic fortification of the American Civil War in Idaho

Coordinates: 46°27′00″N 116°49′03″W

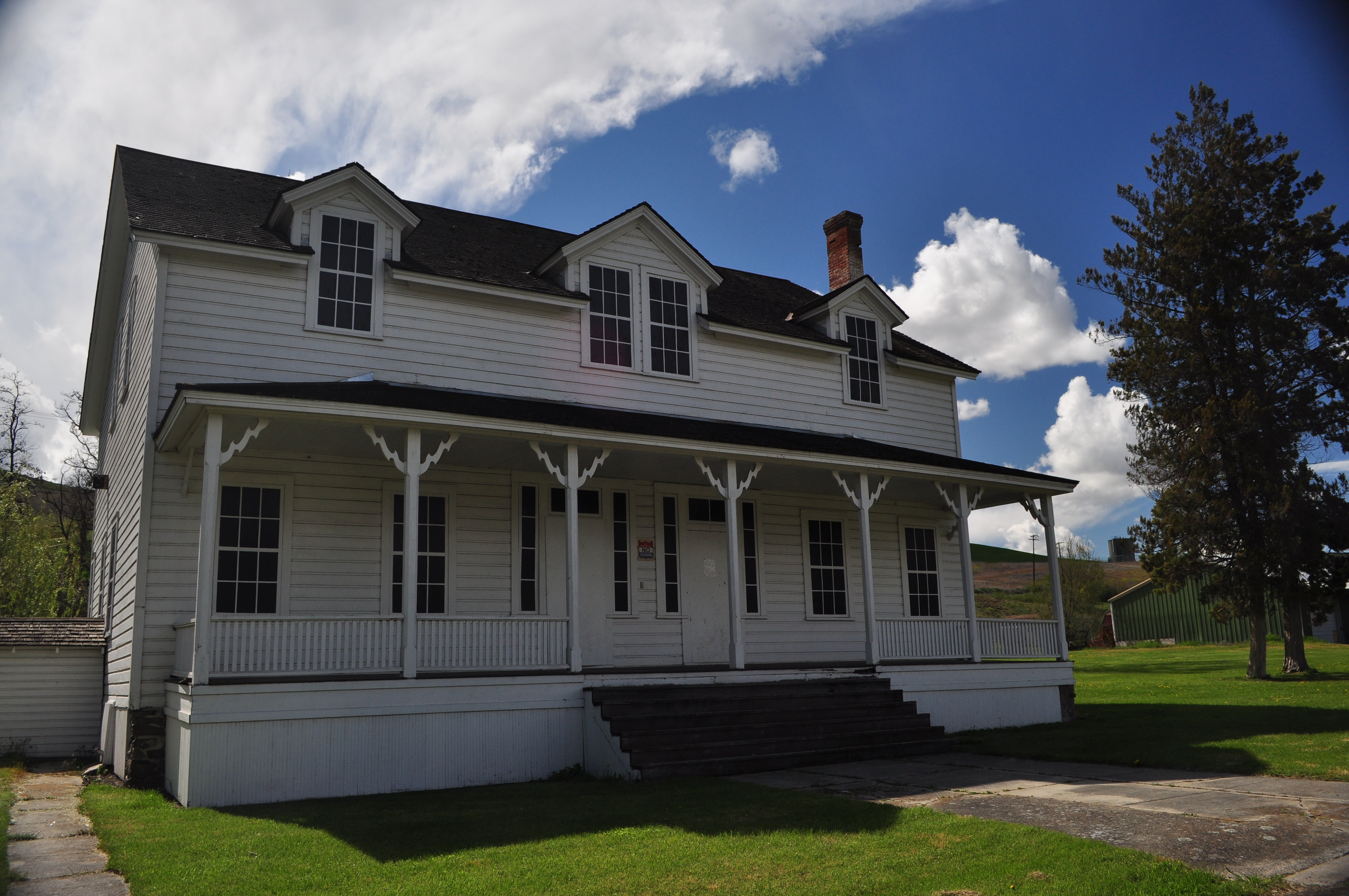
Officers' quarters, Fort Lapwai

Fort Lapwai in north central Idaho

Fort Lapwai (1862–1884) was a federal fort in present-day Lapwai in north central Idaho, United States. On the Nez Perce Indian Reservation in Nez Perce County, it was originally called Camp Lapwai until 1863. East of Lewiston, it was located on the west bank of Lapwai Creek, three miles (5 km) above where it joins the Clearwater River at the state's first settlement, Lapwai Mission Station (now Spalding), built in 1836 by Henry Spalding. It is part of the multi-site Nez Perce National Historical Park. The word "Lapwai" means place of the butterflies, as the area had thousands in early summer in earlier years.

== History ==
Camp Lapwai was established by Major Jacob S. Rinearson, 1st Oregon Cavalry by order of Brigadier General Benjamin Alvord. The post was established to prevent both the increasing numbers of white settlers from attempting to encroach on Nez Perce lands and the Nez Perce from retaliating. Company E 1st Regiment Washington Territory Volunteer Infantry recently mustered in at Alcatraz, were ordered on October 19, 1862, to Camp Lapwai near the Nez Perce Agency, where they were to build the encampment. Company "F", 1st Oregon Volunteer Cavalry Regiment joined them at the post in November 1862. It was renamed Fort Lapwai in 1863, in what would become bounds of the Idaho Territory when it was created in March.

It was briefly unoccupied in 1866 at the end of the Civil War, when the Volunteer regiments were disbanded and before sufficient Federal troops were available to garrison it. Reoccupied again that November it was only unoccupied again between July and November 1867. It was finally decommissioned on June 5, 1884, and turned over to the Indian Service.

The Northern Idaho Indian Agency moved to the site in 1904 and several original structures remain. A tuberculosis sanatorium (and preventorium) was established at the fort site in 1907 and operated until 1944. The village of Lapwai was incorporated in 1911, with a model rural school.

== Garrisons ==
- Company E, 1st Regiment Washington Territory Volunteer Infantry October, 1862 - October, 1864
- Company "F", 1st Oregon Cavalry Regiment, November, 1862 - May, 1865.

== See also ==
- Washington in the American Civil War
- Idaho in the American Civil War
