= Franklin B. Sprague =

American military officer, businessman, and judge

- Captain Franklin Sprague, ca. 1865
- Born: July 16, 1825; Delaware, Ohio
- Died: February 7, 1895 (aged 69); Delaware, Ohio
- Burial place: Oak Grove Cemetery Delaware, Ohio
- Military career
- Allegiance: United States of America; Union
- Branch: (United States) Union Army
- Service years: 1864 - 1867
- Rank: Captain
- Unit: 1st Oregon Volunteer Infantry
- Commands: I Company; Fort Klamath
- Conflicts: American Civil War; Indian skirmishes
- Other work: Businessman and judge

Franklin Burnet Sprague (July 16, 1825 – February 7, 1895) was an American military officer, businessman, and judge. He joined the Union Army during the Civil War, serving on the Oregon frontier. During his military service, Sprague explored much of Southern Oregon. While building a road near Fort Klamath, Sprague led a party into the Cascade Mountains to investigate Crater Lake. His party was the first to descend the 800-foot caldera wall to reach the lake's shore. A month later, Sprague published an article highlighting the lake's unique beauty. Today, the Sprague River in southern Oregon bears his name.

== Early life ==
Sprague was born on July 16, 1825, in Delaware, Ohio. His parents were Pardon and Mary (Meeker) Sprague. His father was a stockman, hotel keeper, county sheriff, and state legislator. Sprague received a private education in a small school near his home. He later attended Ohio Wesleyan University in his home town.

In 1850, Sprague moved to Oregon. He settled in Jackson County, where he opened a shop that built fanning-mills for winnowing grain. Sprague was the first manufacturer in the Pacific Northwest to produce modern winnowing machines. Like the majority of Oregonians at the time, Sprague was a strong supporter of the Union during the American Civil War.

== Military service ==
In 1864, Sprague joined the Union Army, and was commissioned as a Captain in the 1st Oregon Volunteer Infantry Regiment. He was given command of I Company, and posted to Southern Oregon. He participated in a number of skirmishes with the Northern Paiute and other Indian bands in southeastern Oregon. In addition to fighting Indians, Sprague learned to speak their languages and counted many Indians among his friends, including the Modoc chief known as Captain Jack.

Captain Sprague was well respected as a leader, and often led detachments of cavalry as well as infantrymen. In October 1865, Sprague was leading a patrol of eleven cavalry troopers from C Company of the 1st Oregon Cavalry south of Warner Lake in present-day Lake County, Oregon, when they were ambushed by approximately 125 Indians in two groups. Sprague and his troops were caught between a lake, high cliffs, and the two groups of Indians. After exchanging long-range gun fire with the Indians, Sprague determined that while the Indian in front of him had guns, those behind him had only bows and arrows. He quickly ordered his men to charge to the rear. His men broke through the Indian's skirmish line and made a successful escape with no casualties.

== Crater Lake ==
Sprague and twenty men from Company I were assigned to build a road linking the Rogue River with the existing John Day road. This connected Jacksonville and southwest Oregon with John Day's mining country. After the construction work was completed, Sprague published a list of the best camp sites along the road in the Jacksonville newspapers so that the wagon masters could find the best water and grass along the way.

On August 1, 1865, two hunters from Sprague's road construction crew rediscovered Crater Lake, which had been first visited in 1853, but was never effectively recorded so that others could locate it. Based on directions from his hunters, Sprague and five other men visited the lake on August 12. They climbed down the 800-foot caldera cliff to become the first explorers to reach the lake shore. Sprague's account of the visit was reported to Jacksonville's leading newspaper, the Oregon Sentinel on August 25.

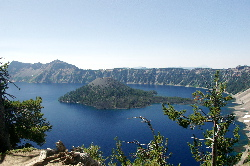
Wizard Island and Crater Lake's caldera

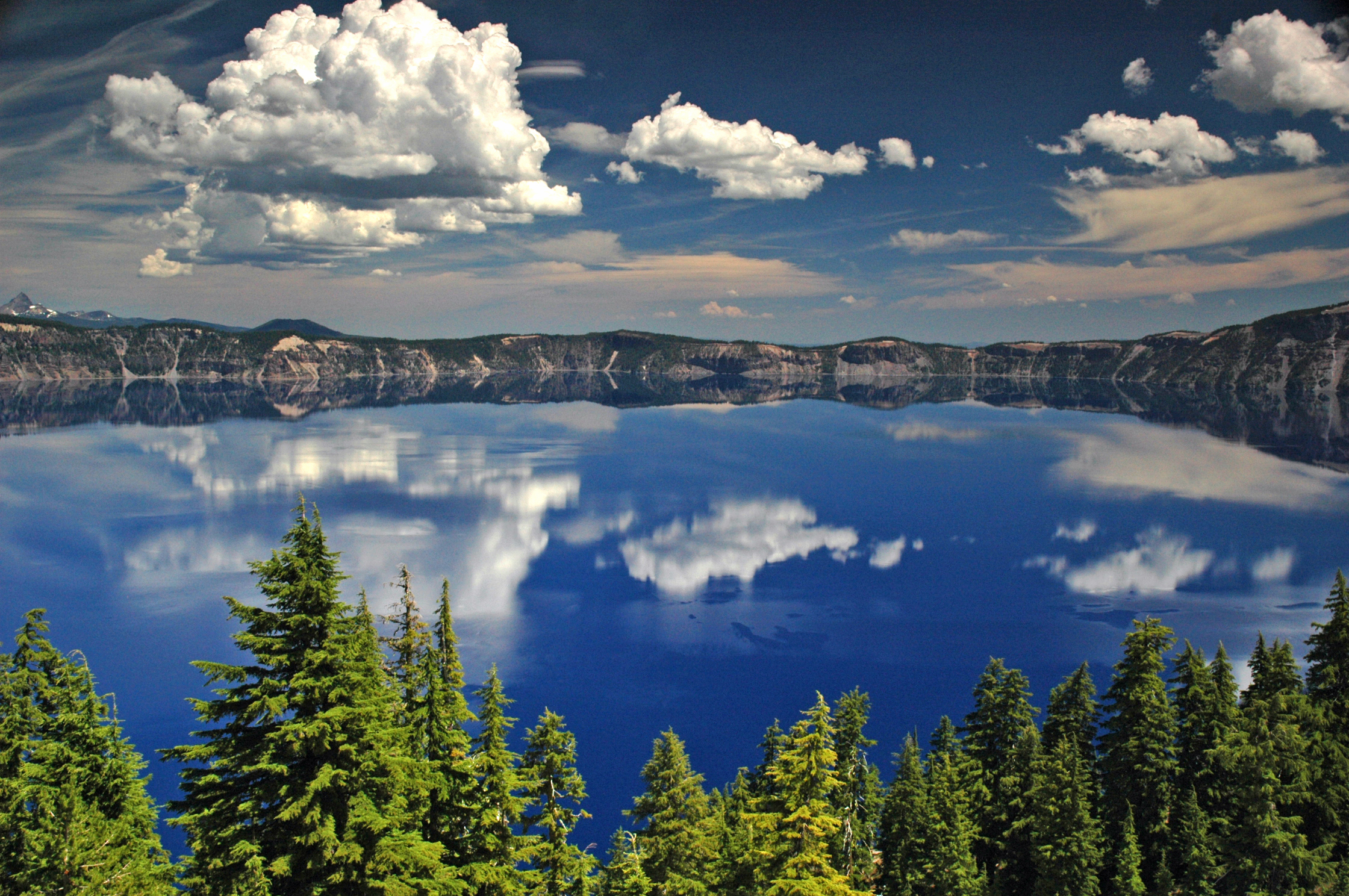
Blue waters continually change shades

Sprague's report was published in the Oregon Sentinel on September 9, 1865. It included several significant observations. First, Sprague identified the volcanic origins of the lake. His report described Wizard Island, and observed it was a remnant of volcanic activity. Second, his description of the lake's unique beauty was thoughtful and eloquent.

...you sit down on the brink of the precipice, and feast your eyes on the awful grandeur, your thoughts wander back thousands of years to the time when, where now is a placid sheet of water, there was a lake of fire, throwing its cinders and ashes to vast distances in every direction. The whole surroundings prove this lake to be the crater of an extinct volcano. The appearance of the water in the basin, as seen from the top of the mountain, is that of a vast circular sheet of canvass, upon which some painter had been exercising his art. The color of the water is blue, but in very many different shades, and like the colors in variegated silk, continually changing. Now a spot will be dark blue, almost approaching black, the next moment it will change to a very pale blue; and it is thus continually changing from one shade to another...

Sprague also predicted that the lake would "be visited by thousands hereafter." Finally, he recommended that the lake not be named after its discoverer, saying: "I do not know who first saw this lake, nor do I think it should be named after the discoverer." Sprague suggested it be called "Lake Majestic." Today, it is known as Crater Lake. Since he was the first to identify the lake's volcanic origin, Sprague deserves some credit for the name.

== Later life ==
On July 19, 1867, Captain Sprague and the men of Company I were mustered out of the Army. They were the last members of the 1st Oregon Volunteer Infantry Regiment to be released from active duty.

In 1868, Sprague returned to Delaware County, Ohio. He settled in Sunbury, where he started a grain milling business. In 1875, Sprague ran as the Democratic Party's candidate for Delaware County Probate Judge, and was elected. He was easily re-elected in 1878, completing his term in 1882. Sprague died on February 7, 1895. He is buried in the Oak Grove Cemetery in Delaware, Ohio.

== Legacy ==
Sprague played an important part in the early history of Crater Lake National Park. His exploration party was the first to reach the lake's shore. He was the first to identify the lake's volcanic origin, and his article in the Oregon Sentinel generated public interest in Crater Lake's unique beauty.

In addition, Sprague explored much of Southern Oregon. The Sprague River is named after him. The Sprague River Valley, the town of Sprague River, and Sprague River Park in Fremont National Forest near Bly, Oregon, also derive their names from Franklin Sprague.
