= Battle of Mud Lake =

1865 battle of the Snake War

- Part of the Indian Wars, Snake War
| Date | 14 March 1865 |
| Location | Mud Lake, Nevada Territory 40.6°N 119.1°W |
| Result | U.S. victory |

Nations
| United States | Smoke Creek Paiute - Kuyuidika-a Paiute |

Commanders and leaders
| Almond B. Wells | Unknown |

Units involved
- 1st Nevada Cavalry Battalion, Companies D and E

Strength
| 29 troopers of 1st Battalion Nevada Volunteer Cavalry; 2 civilian guides | 30 Kuyuidika-a Paiute women, children, elderly. |

Casualties and losses
| "several wounded" | 29 killed |
- Location of the Battle of Mud Lake

The Battle of Mud Lake, also known as the Skirmish at Mud Lake and subsequently referred to as the Mud Lake Massacre, occurred on March 15, 1865 during the Snake War in northwest Nevada Territory, at present-day Winnemucca Lake, Nevada, during the closing months of the concurrent American Civil War.

== Battle timeline ==
Fifty men from the 1st Nevada Volunteer Cavalry Battalion under Captain Almond D. Wells rode out towards Pyramid Lake in response to cattle theft in the area. Michno writes that upon arrival the troopers were informed by Chief Winnemucca that a band of Smoke Creek Paiutes were the likely thieves. However, Sarah Winnemucca wrote that her father, Chief Winnemucca, and all the young men were at Carson Sink on a hunting expedition at the time. Stewart states that Sarah Winnemucca and her father were in Dayton, NV at the time of the attack and that her father read about the attack in the newspaper. This claim is ironic because Chief Winnemucca could not read.

Wells report stated that he took 29 of his command and two civilian guides toward Mud Lake (now Winnemucca Lake) where the camp was located. Wells intended to arrest the thieves and wrote that the Paiutes began firing once the cavalry approached. Wells surrounded the camp and the natives attempted to escape. The troops killed 29 Native Americans while only one was reported to have escaped. Several of the troopers were reported wounded in the fight. Wells also reported that Chief Winnemucca expressed he was pleased with Wells' victory believing it would teach the thieving bands a lesson.

However, Sarah Winnemucca, whose sister was the sole survivor of the attack, transcribed the story from the perspective of the Kuyuidika-a Paiute;

The soldiers rode up to their encampment and fired into it, and killed almost all the people that were there. Oh, it is a fearful thing to tell, but it must be told. Yes, it must be told by me. It was all old men, women and children that were killed; for my father had all the young men with him at the sink of Carson on a hunting excursion, or they would have been killed too. After the soldiers had killed all but some little children and babies still tied up in their baskets, the soldiers took them also, and set the camp on fire and threw them into the flames to see them burn alive. I had one baby brother killed there. My sister jumped on father's best horse and ran away. As she ran the soldiers ran after her but thanks be to the Good Father in the Spirit-land my dear sister got away. This almost killed my poor papa.

— Sarah Winnemucca

Among those dead was Sarah's mother, Tuboitony.

A contemporary newspaper article says that Young Winnemucca (Numaga) stated that there were only three or four men in the camp and that sixteen to eighteen women and children were killed, along with one or two men. Two of Chief Winnemucca's wives were killed, but his daughters survived. The men who stole the cattle were not in the camp, they became aware that the soldiers were coming and fled.

== Aftermath ==
Major Charles McDermit and Nevada's first governor Henry Blasdel met with Paiute leaders at Fort Churchill. Chief Winnemucca arrived wearing full war paint, along with more than 60 Paiute chiefs and leaders. Winnemucca said that the men who stole the cattle were not in their camp. Numaga stated that Winnemucca had just lost his wives and newborn son, and that if only asked they would have given up any cattle thieves before this blood was spilled. There was already a precedent of forfeiting native people in the kangaroo courts of the wild west, regardless of actual guilt. (At this time the Paiutes were suffering from starvation during the boom of the Comstock in a desert that was never designed to support large populations.) Though war is not started, it is this event which causes Chief Winnemucca to swear to never return to the Pyramid Lake Paiute reservation, a vow which he held to for the rest of his life.

In 1962, Smith wrote that at Camp Nye, Wells was asked to describe his actions. In 1972, Egan wrote that McDermit brought charges against Wells because Wells had violated a standing order by not taking prisoners. The court of inquiry acquitted Wells on the basis of Wells' account that the Paiute had fired first.

In 1971, Sessions Wheeler recounted newspaper coverage of the skirmish in detail, and includes citations to newspaper articles around the time of the skirmish that state that 14 to 15 scalps were taken. Wheeler also quotes Major McDermit as stating that 32 were killed and "all but two were men." rather than 29. Wheeler states that a thorough search of military records found no evidence of any investigation into the event. Wheeler notes that in the aftermath, "the Black Rock Desert region became the principal battleground for a conflict which, in respect to its ferocity, probably had no equal in Nevada history."

Most of the local newspaper coverage applauded Wells for his actions, reflecting the savage attitude of the men of the Comstock Lode. However, while the Virginia Daily Union initially called to "let loose the dogs of war, and cry havoc" the paper later questioned how Wells's company survived such a fight with only one wounded returning volunteer, and why no weapons had been confiscated from the enemy. The Virginia Daily Union's subsequent call for an investigation into this military action has no recorded response. Sarah Winnemucca claims violent community support for Wells echoed beyond the incident, "They went after my people all over Nevada. Reports were made everywhere throughout the whole country by the white settlers, that the red devils were killing their cattle, and by this lying of the white settlers the trail began which is marked by the blood of my people."
