= Winnemucca Lake =

Dry lake bed in Nevada with petroglyphs

- Winnemucca Lake
- Coordinates: 40°06′40″N 119°20′28″W
- Surface elevation: 3,770 ft (1,150 m)

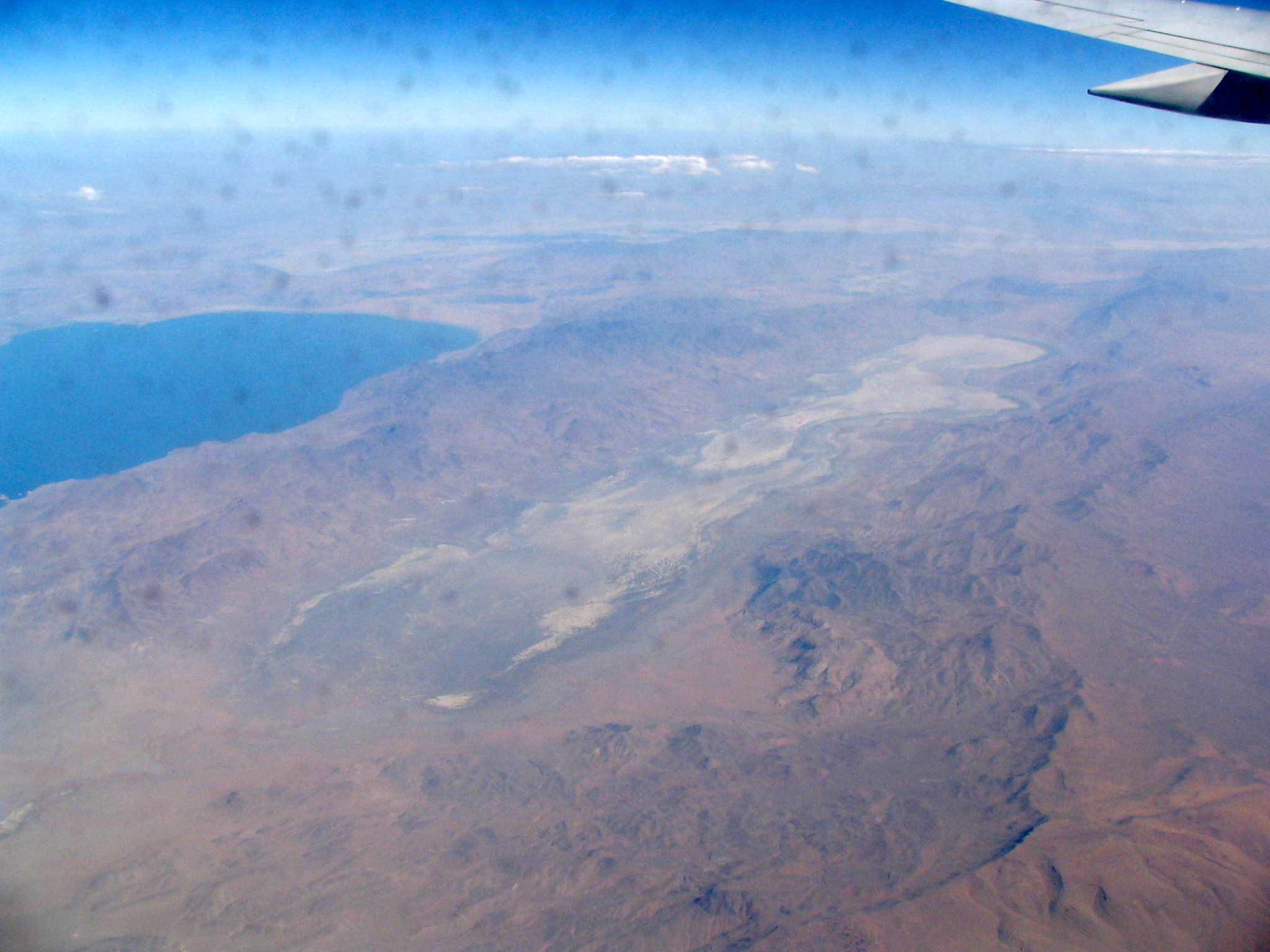
Winnemucca Lake bed, blue lake to the left is Pyramid Lake

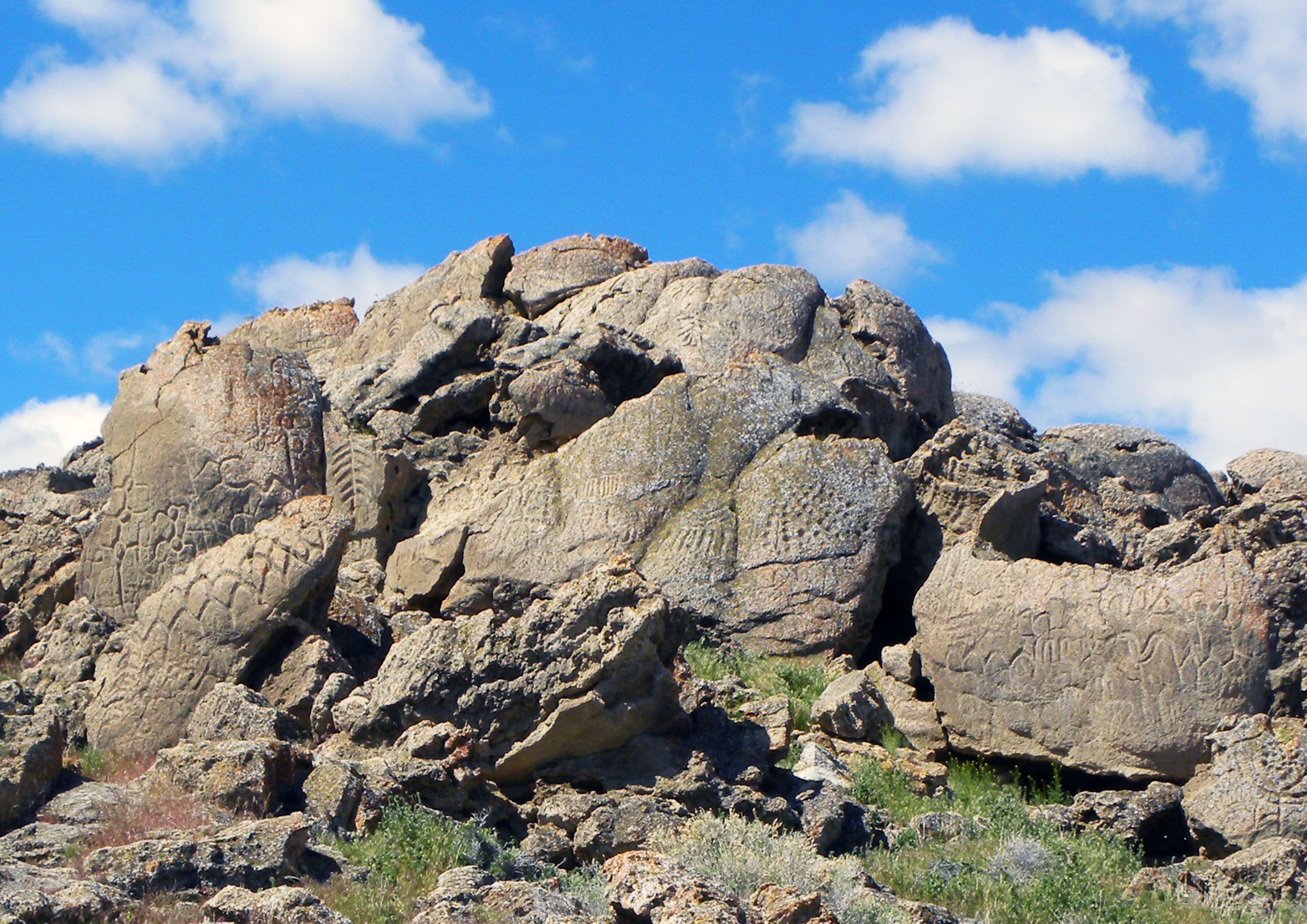
Petroglyph site 26 Wa 3329, with some of the oldest known petroglyphs in the Americas

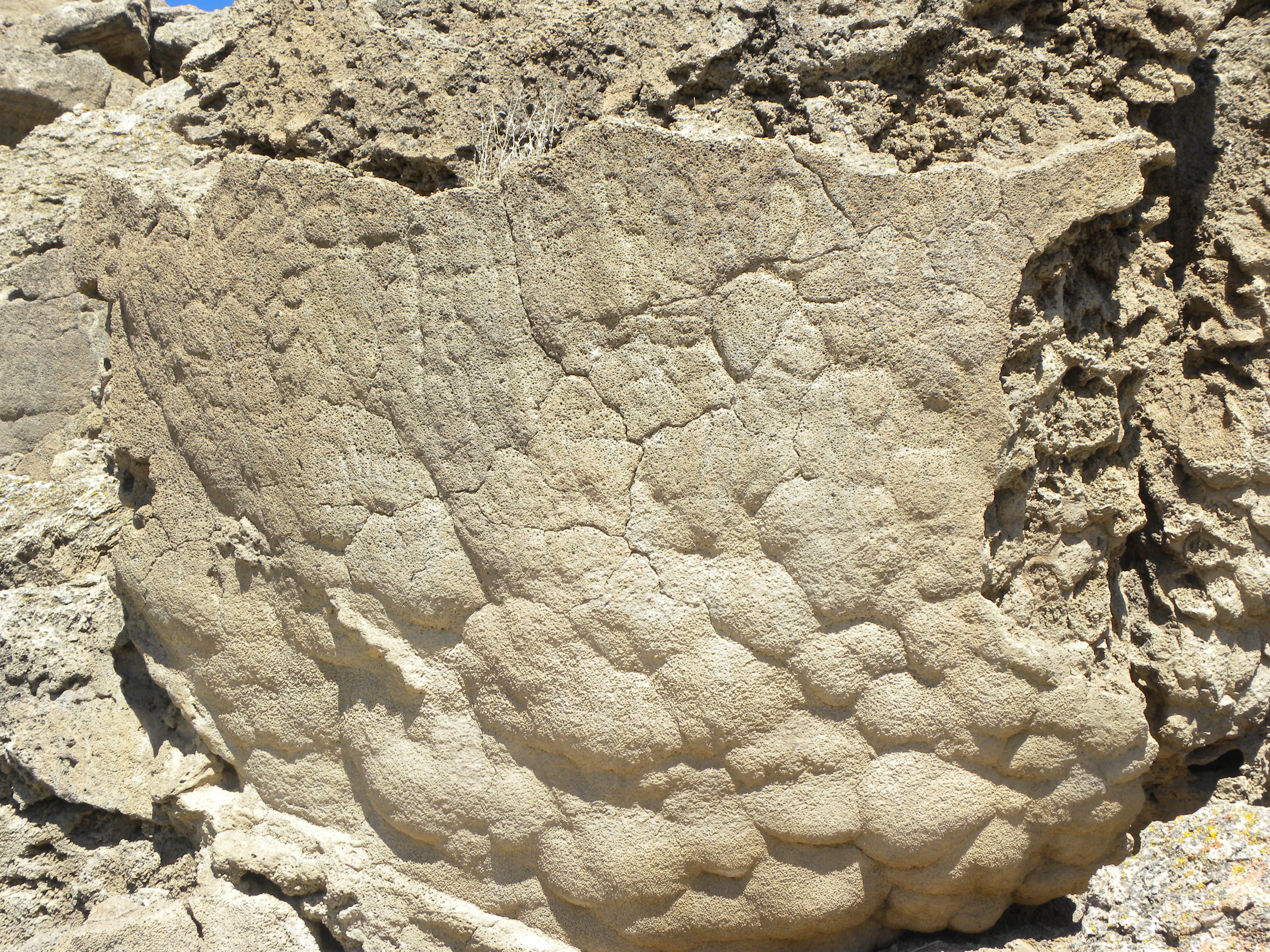
Detail of Petroglyphs – the carvings can be dated because they were covered by tufa layers, after the water level rose above them

Winnemucca Lake is a dry lake bed in northwest Nevada that features the oldest known petroglyphs in North America. Located astride the border between Washoe and Pershing counties, it was a shallow lake until the 1930s, but was dried when a dam and a road were built that combined to restrict and block water flow. It was formerly designated as a National Wildlife Refuge, but its status as a refuge was removed due to the lack of water.

Winnemucca Lake is home to several petroglyphs long believed to be very old. In 2013, researchers dated the carvings to between 14,800 and 10,500 years ago. Either date would make them the oldest known petroglyphs found in North America. The carvings lie within the Pyramid Lake Indian Reservation.

Note: There is another lake, having the same name of "Winnemucca Lake" in California, near the Carson pass (coordinates: 38°40'10.80"N, 119°59'36.59"W).

== Geography ==
Winnemucca Lake is a sub-basin within the Lahontan Basin in northwestern Nevada. It lies east of Pyramid Lake and is on the dividing line between Washoe and Pershing counties. The lake bed lies between the Lake Range on the west and the Nightingale Mountains and Selenite Range to the east. Winnemucca Lake is about 45 km (28 mi) long and about 7 km (4.3 mi) wide. The lake bed is at an elevation of 1,150 m (3,770 ft), which is below the water level of adjacent Pyramid Lake.

== History ==
Winnemucca Lake may have been dry when John Frémont came through in 1843–44. Frémont's 1844 map indicates that he traveled to the west of Winnemucca Lake and does not map the Winnemucca Lake valley. The Elko Free Press reports that there was a flood in 1862 that filled the lake to 80 feet (24 m), but Russell states that the level was low in 1862.

In 1865, Winnemucca Lake (then known as Mud Lake) was the site of the Battle of Mud Lake where 29 soldiers from the 1st Nevada Volunteer Cavalry Battalion led by Captain Almond B. Wells (and two civilian guides) killed 29 Smoke Creek Indians. At least two of those killed were women, possibly more. Sarah Winnemucca wrote "I had one baby brother killed there. My sister jumped on father's best horse and ran away. As she ran the soldiers ran after her but thanks be to the Good Father in the Spirit land my dear sister got away. This almost killed my poor papa."

The maximum level of the lake was 26 meters (85 ft) in the 1880s

Winnemucca Lake was a shallow tule-filled lake and an important stop for migrating waterfowl. After the Derby Dam was built on the Truckee River in 1903 (the first project of the Reclamation Act), and State Route 447 (which blocked the slough connecting it to Pyramid Lake) was built, Winnemucca Lake dried out and has remained seasonally dry since the late 1930s. In 1936, Franklin D. Roosevelt invoked the Migratory Bird Conservation Act to create the Winnemucca Migratory Bird Refuge as a "refuge and breeding ground for migratory birds and other wildlife." In 1940, the name was changed to the Winnemucca National Wildlife Refuge. In 1962, the refuge designation was removed, making this area the first refuge designation lost because of lack of water.

== Petroglyphs ==
The western end of Winnemucca Lake is home to several boulders carved with petroglyphs that lie within the Pyramid Lake Indian Reservation. The site, officially designated 26Wa3329, was first described by Connick and Connick in 1992. The team, Frances and Robert E. Connick, classified it as unusual, and possibly very early. In 1994, geochemist Larry Benson determined the designs had been carved into a branch form of tufa, a type of limestone. The research showed that the limestone was deposited between 16,200 and 14,800 years ago, but no specific date for the carvings was suggested.

In 2013, a team of researchers from the University of Colorado at Boulder (including Benson) collected carbonate crust and shallow-water algal formations from the site. They then used radiocarbon dating strontium isotope analysis and total inorganic carbon data from a core in Pyramid Lake to establish a window of when the lake level was low enough to allow access to the rocks. Sedimentary cores were collected from nearby Pyramid Lake and subjected to analysis to determine rise and fall of the waterline over time. More precise methods of dating would have required taking scrapings from the grooves of the petroglyphs, which was not allowed by the Pyramid Lake Paiute Tribe. However, Benson was allowed to use non-invasive techniques to examine the petroglyphs that allowed him to work to the side of the carvings. The research was published in the Journal of Archaeological Science.

Dating of the lowest (newest) carbonate crust yielded a date of 10,200 to 9,800 years ago. The algal formation dating suggested the waterline was sufficiently low from 12,600 to 11,400 years ago. The sedimentary core analysis of Pyramid Lake showed the waterline began to fall about 15,000 years ago, reaching a low approximately 13,300 years ago. At about 13,200 years ago it rose again, and had intermittent low periods thereafter (from 11,300 to 10,500 according to one method, or from 11,500 to 11,100 according to another). The broad consistencies among the various dating methods allowed the research team to conclude the petroglyph rocks were above the waterline, and thus available for carving, from 14,800 and 13,200 years ago and between 11,300 and 10,500 years ago. Additionally, the younger date range is consistent with the date of textiles previously found within the Winnemucca sub-basin (dated as old as 10,700 years ago) and the date of various human artifacts previously found within the Lahontan Basin (dated from 11,000 to 10,400 years ago). The younger dates also align with the estimated age of the Spirit Cave mummy found nearby. Either date range would make the petroglyphs the oldest found in North America to date. The older date would roughly correspond to the estimated time of the first human migrations into North America and to remains found in Paisley Cave, Oregon. Previously, the oldest carvings in North America were thought to be those estimated to be 7,300 years old found at Long Lake, in Oregon.

The rocks include both simple petroglyphs such as straight lines and swirls and more complex petroglyphs that resemble trees, flowers, or the veins of a leaf. There also is an intricate diamond pattern on one rock. The smallest are approximately 8 inches (20 cm) in width, while the largest are 3 feet (0.91 m). Grooves are approximately .4 to .8 inches (1.0 to 2.0 cm) deep. The carvings are deeper and larger than those typically found in the Southwestern United States. The meaning of the carvings is unknown. The Connick team suggested the petroglyphs may represent meteorological symbols such as clouds and lightning. Benson's team suggests the Winnemucca Lake petroglyphs share several distinctive features in common with the Long Lake petroglyphs that are not found in more recent petroglyphs.

How the petroglyphs were created is not known. One possibility is that hard volcanic rock was used to chip away at the softer carbonate formations on the boulders.
