= 8th District of Columbia Infantry Battalion =

- Active: April–July, 1861
- Disbanded: July, 1861
- Country: United States
- Allegiance: Union
- Branch: Infantry
- Size: Battalion
- Engagements: American Civil War

The 8th District of Columbia Infantry Battalion was an infantry battalion that served in the Union Army between April and July, 1861, during the American Civil War.

== Service ==
The battalion was organized at Washington, D.C. Its purpose, until June, was the defence of Washington. In June, the regiment formed part of an expedition to Rockville, Maryland, passing through Seneca Mills (on June 10) and reaching Great Falls on July 7. They were then mustered out during July, 1861.

== See also ==
- List of District of Columbia Civil War regiments

== Bibliography ==
- Dyer, Frederick H. (1959). A Compendium of the War of the Rebellion. New York and London. Thomas Yoseloff, Publisher. LCCN 59-12963.
