= List of Oregon units in the American Civil War =

== Infantry ==
- 1st Oregon Volunteer Infantry Regiment

== Cavalry ==
- 1st Oregon Volunteer Cavalry Regiment

== Artillery ==
- No artillery regiments were raised in the State of Oregon during the American Civil War.

== State Militia ==
- Mountain Rangers
- Washington Guards
- Fenian Guards
- Zouave Cadets
- Marion Rifles

== See also ==
- Lists of American Civil War Regiments by State
- Lists of Oregon-related topics
