= Snake Indians =

Collective name given to three Native American tribes

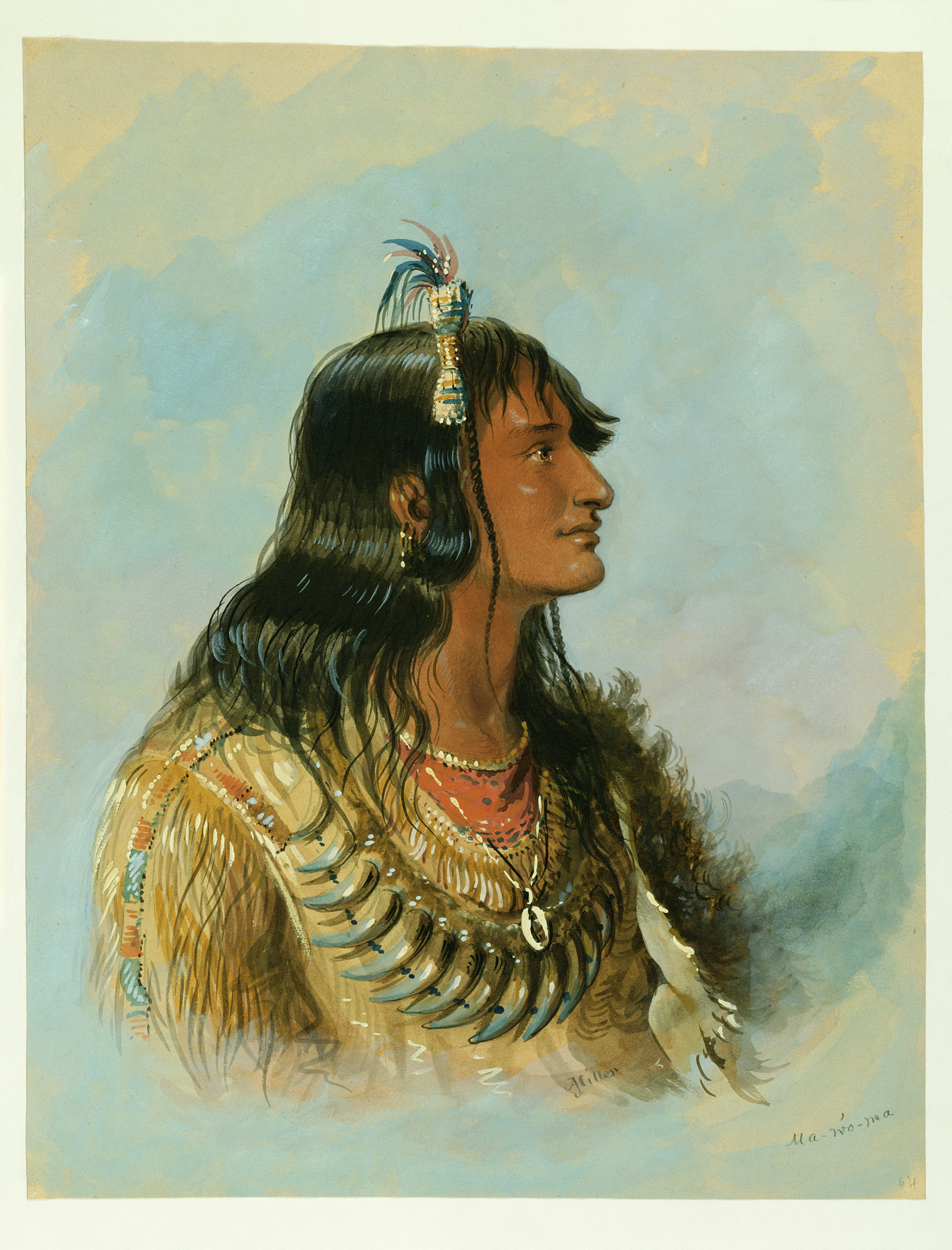
Ma-wo-ma, a 19th-century leader of approximately 3,000 Snake Indians (portrait by Alfred Jacob Miller, currently on display in the Walters Art Museum).

Map of territory inhabited by the Snake Indian tribes, colloquially referred to as Snake Country

Snake Indians is a collective name given to the Northern Paiute, Bannock, and Shoshone Native American tribes.

The term was used as early as 1739 by French trader and explorer Pierre Gaultier de Varennes, sieur de La Vérendrye when he described hearing of the Gens du Serpent ("Snake people") from the Mandans. This is probably the first written mention of the Shoshone people. The term "Snakes" is also used to refer to the Shoshone by British explorers David Thompson and Anthony Henday.

The term was also used by Plains Indians to refer to the Shoshone. They called the Shoshone "snake" referring to the Shoshone sign in Plains Indian Sign Language for the Shoshone people. The sign was used for salmon but the fish was unknown on the Great Plains.

This term was widely used by American immigrants on the Oregon Trail in the Snake River and Owyhee River valleys of southern Idaho and Eastern Oregon. The term "Snake Indian" later included the Northern Paiute tribes found in the basins between the Cascade Mountains and these valleys in Oregon and northern Nevada and northeastern California. These people were the opponents of the California, Oregon, and Washington Volunteers and US Army, in the Snake War.

== In Canadian history ==
From 1688-1720s, when the British Empire first came into prolonged trade contact with the Western Cree and Blackfoot, both of these groups were united in a war against "the Snake Indians" of Canada. It is not clear if this term (used in this period of Canadian history) is meant to refer to the Northern Paiute people, inaccurate, or perhaps entirely unrelated. In modern Plains Cree language, the term "kinêpikoyiniwak / ᑭᓀᐱᑯᔨᓂᐘᐠ", literally translating to "Snake Indian" refers to Shoshone people.

== See also ==
- Bannock War
- Klamath Tribes
- Paiute War
- Sheepeater Indian War
- Snake War
