= 1st Oregon Cavalry Regiment =

1st Oregon Volunteer Cavalry Regiment
- Flag of the United States, 1865–1867
- Active: April 1862 to November 20, 1866.
- Country: United States
- Allegiance: Union
- Branch: Cavalry
- Engagements: Snake War

The First Regiment Oregon volunteer Cavalry was a volunteer regiment in United States service Union army that was formed in response to the American Civil War. With men recruited in Oregon and some recruited in surrounding states, the regiment primarily served to protect the state of Oregon and surrounding territories during the American Civil War.

== Background ==
In 1861, Colonel George Wright requested permission from Oregon Governor John Whiteaker to form a cavalry company in the state, as Wright was commander of the District of Oregon that included the Washington Territory. Wright was motivated by the fact that there were a total of 700 soldiers and 19 officers in the Pacific Northwest at a time when there were often battles with Native Americans. Some volunteers joined up, asked to provide their own horse, but were later discharged when the organization failed before Wright was transferred to California.

Lieutenant Colonel Albemarle Cady replaced Wright late in 1861 as United States Army regular troops were returned east for the American Civil War. To replace those troops, Wright sent volunteers from California to protect Oregon from attacks by Native Americans. In response, Oregon then commissioned Thomas R. Cornelius in November 1861 as colonel and ordered him to raise ten companies of cavalry troops. Oregonians were unhappy with California volunteers protecting Oregon.

== Formation ==
The initial part of the regiment (companies A through F) was organized and mustered into the army in Oregon from December 1861 to April 1862. In May 1862, it was sent into the Washington Territory to the Walla Walla country to protect immigrants and miners along the Salmon River. The 1st Oregon occupied Fort Walla Walla in June 1862 and sent out various expeditions over the next two years to fight the Snake Indians and other threats. Hence, the regiment was rarely intact as a single unit for much of the war. Several companies scattered to other frontier forts, including Fort Vancouver and Fort Dalles (see also The Dalles, Oregon) for detached duty such as constructing roads through the wilderness.

In January 1863, the remaining portion of the regiment (companies G, H, I, K, and M) were authorized and activated for duty. Companies G and H served at Camp Watson on Rock Creek; Company I was at Fort Klamath, Company K at Fort Dalles and Companies L and M at Fort Boise in Idaho Territory. The battalion came together for several skirmishes with local Indians in the Harney Lake Valley and other locations.

Men signed up for a three-year tour of duty with the cavalry. Pay was $13 per month for each soldier, and at the end of service men were given a $100 bounty and 160 acres (0.65 km^{2}) of land. In addition to Col. Cornelius, other officers included R. F. Maury, C. S. Drew, Benjamin F. Harding as quartermaster, and J. S. Rinearson.

== Disbanding ==
In January 1865, Col. Reuben F. Maury, 1st Oregon Cavalry, assumed command of the Federal District of Oregon. The 1st Oregon Cavalry mustered out November 20, 1866.

The 1st Oregon Volunteer Cavalry Regiment did not muster out all at once, but did so in stages beginning in November 1864. Two years later there were only a small number of men remaining to muster out of service.

== 1st Regiment Oregon Volunteer Cavalry Commanders ==
- Colonel Thomas R. Cornelius 1862
- Colonel Reuben F. Maury 1862–1865

== Company assignments ==
- Company A – The company was organized near Oregon City and moved to Fort Dalles then to Fort Walla Walla, Washington Territory, June 24 – July 12, 1862. The Company left Fort Walla Walla, July 25, 1862, for Salmon Falls on the Snake River Expedition against Snake Indians in what is now Idaho, August 19 – October 11, 1862, and protecting emigrant roads until November. At Fort Dalles until April, 1863 then ordered to Fort Walla Walla April 20 and sent on another Expedition against Snake Indians in Idaho from May 4 to October 26, 1863. Expedition from Fort Walla Walla to Snake River, Idaho Territory, February 16–23, 1864, and to Southeastern Oregon April 30 to October 6, 1864. Expedition from Fort Boise to Salmon Falls, Idaho Territory, and skirmishes from August 27 to October 5, 1864. At Fort Vancouver and other stations in Oregon and Idaho until muster out. Expedition from Camp Lyon, Idaho Territory, to Malheur River, Oregon, and skirmish July 2–13, 1865.
- Company B – Company "B" moved from Salem, Oregon, to Fort Vancouver then to Fort Walla Walla via Fort Dalles from May 14 – June 2, 1862. The Company left Fort Walla Walla July 25, 1862, for Salmon Falls on Snake River. Expedition against Snake Indians in Idaho August 19 – October 11, 1862, and protected emigrant roads until November 1, 1862. At Fort Walla Walla until April 1863. Moved to Fort Lapwai June 13, 1863, then to Canyon City July 10. Ordered to Fort Vancouver on September 29, 1863, with duty there until April 1864. Expedition to Southeastern Oregon and skirmishes April 20 – October 6, 1864. Duty at Forts Vancouver, Walla Walla, Boise and other points in the District of Oregon until muster out. Expedition from Camp Lyon, Idaho Territory, to Malheur River, Oregon, and skirmish July 2–13, 1865.
- Company C – The company was organized near Oregon City moved to Fort Vancouver June 24, 1862. (A Detachment ordered to Jacksonville, Oregon, July 2, 1862.) Duty there and at Klamath operating against Indians in Rogue River District until June, 1865. At Fort Steilacoom and other points in District of Oregon until muster out.
- Company D – The company was organized near Oregon City moved to Fort Dalles; then to Fort Walla Walla from June 24 – July 12, 1862. Left Fort Walla Walla July 25 for Salmon Falls on Snake River. Expedition against Snake Indians in Idaho and protecting emigrant roads August 19 to October 11, 1862. At Fort Walla Walla November, 1862, to April, 1863. Expedition from Fort Walla Walla against Snake Indians in Idaho May 4 – October 20, 1863. Ordered to Fort Dalles October 29, and duty there until April, 1864. Expedition to Southeastern Oregon and skirmishes April 20 – October 6, 1864. Expedition from Siletz Block House to Coos Bay, Crooked River, April 21 – May 12, 1864 (Co. "D"). Ordered to Fort Vancouver October 6, 1864. Duty at Fort Vancouver, Fort Walla Walla and other points in the District of Oregon until muster out. Expedition from Camp Lyon, Idaho Territory, to Malheur River, Oregon, and skirmish July 2–13, 1865.
- Company E – The company was organized near Salem moved to Fort Vancouver; then to Fort Walla Walla via Fort Dalles May 14 – June 3, 1862. Duty at Fort Walla Walla until April, 1863. Expedition to Grand Ronde Prairie August 10–22, 1862. Expedition against Snake Indians in Idaho May 4 – October 20, 1863. At Fort Walla Walla until April, 1864. Expedition from Fort Walla Walla to Snake River, Washington Territory, February 16–23, 1864. Expedition from Fort Walla Walla to Southeastern Oregon and skirmishes April 20 – October 6, 1864. At Forts Dalles, Colville and other points in District of Oregon until muster out.
- Company F – The company was organized near Oregon City. Company "F" moved to Fort Dalles; then to Fort Walla Walla June 24 – July 12, 1862. Duty near Lewiston, Nez Perce Reservation, July 25 to November 1, 1862. Garrison at Fort Lapwai until May, 1865. Expedition from Fort Lapwai to the Meadows August 22 to September 20, 1863. Skirmish, Harney Lake Valley September 23, 1864 (Cos. "F" and "H"). At Fort Walla Walla and other points in District of Oregon May, 1865, to muster out.
- Company G – Company "G," authorized January, 1863. Company "G" at Camp Watson on Rock Creek, Ore.

No other companies were mustered during the regiment's service.

Regiment mustered out November 20, 1866.

== See also ==
- Oregon in the Civil War
- List of Oregon units in the American Civil War
