= LaSalle Corbell Pickett =

American author, wife of Confederate General George Pickett

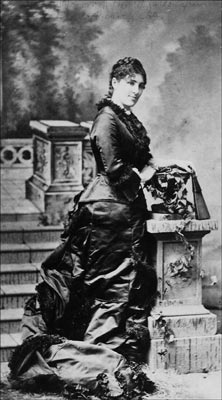
- Sallie Ann (LaSalle) Corbell Pickett, c. 1875
- Born: LaSalle "Sallie" Corbell; May 16, 1843; Chuckatuck, Virginia, United States
- Died: March 22, 1931 (aged 87)
- Burial place: original: Abbey Mausoleum in Arlington, Virginia moved: Hollywood Cemetery in Richmond, Virginia
- Other names: Sallie Corbett Pickett
- Occupation: author
- Notable work: see Works
- Spouse: George Pickett (m. 1863; died 1875)
- Children: 2 sons: George Edward Pickett, David Corbell Pickett
- Parents: David John Corbell (father); Elizabeth Phillips (mother)

LaSalle "Sallie" Corbell Pickett (May 16, 1843 – March 22, 1931) was an American author and the wife of Confederate General George Pickett.

== Early life ==
LaSalle "Sallie" Corbell was born in Chuckatuck, Virginia, on May 16, 1843, the daughter of David John Corbell and Elizabeth Phillips, slaveholders and plantation owners near Suffolk. She attended the Lynchburg Female Seminary in Lynchburg, Virginia.

== Career ==
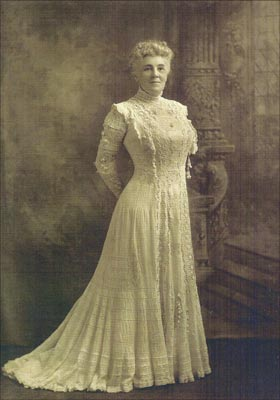
Mrs. Pickett, after 1910

Pickett obtained a professorship in belles-lettres and taught French, Latin and piano in Sherbrooke, Canada. She also sold her jewelry to maintain the family. After General Ulysses S. Grant insisted that the cartel which granted privileges to her husband should be honored, General Pickett and his family returned to their home in Virginia. Pickett accepted a position with the New York Life Insurance Company in Norfolk, with a large salary.

Her husband died of scarlet fever in 1875. Mrs. Pickett received donations from across the southern United States. A subscription was started with eight thousand dollars from one state, and pledges of thousands more. Hearing of that plan to provide her with financial security, Mrs. Pickett resolutely declined to accept the financial aid. Instead, she got a position as a government clerk in the Federal Pensions Office sufficient to support herself and her son. In the 1880s, she became a popular writer and speaker. Her first book was published in 1899, "Pickett and His Men". Between 1899 and 1931, she toured America, and wrote for Cosmopolitan, McClure's, and other popular magazines. She also published a dozen books.

In 1891, after recovering from an accident, she was threatened with total blindness. With health broken, and the almost total loss of her sight, she was able to retain her position in the clerical service of the government.

At George Pickett's request, he was buried among his men in his native Richmond when he died in 1875. Women were not allowed to be buried in the soldiers’ section of Richmond's Hollywood Cemetery at the time of Mrs. Pickett's death in 1931. In 1998, for the first time a woman's remains have ever been allowed in this area, Mrs. Pickett was reburied in the Gettysburg soldiers’ section of Hollywood Cemetery by her husband. "'Mrs. Pickett died in the early 1930s and had wanted to be buried with her husband in the Hollywood Cemetery. But the Hollywood Ladies Memorial Society, which then controlled the Gettysburg Hill portion of the cemetery, wouldn't allow it,' Richmond Discovery tour guide Jim DuPriest said. 'So, Mrs. Pickett was buried in Abbey Mausoleum, beside Arlington National Cemetery in northern Virginia.'"

== Personal life ==
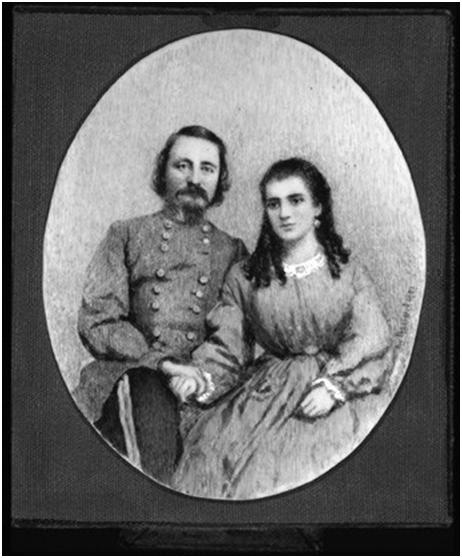
General Pickett and LaSalle Corbell Pickett, 1863

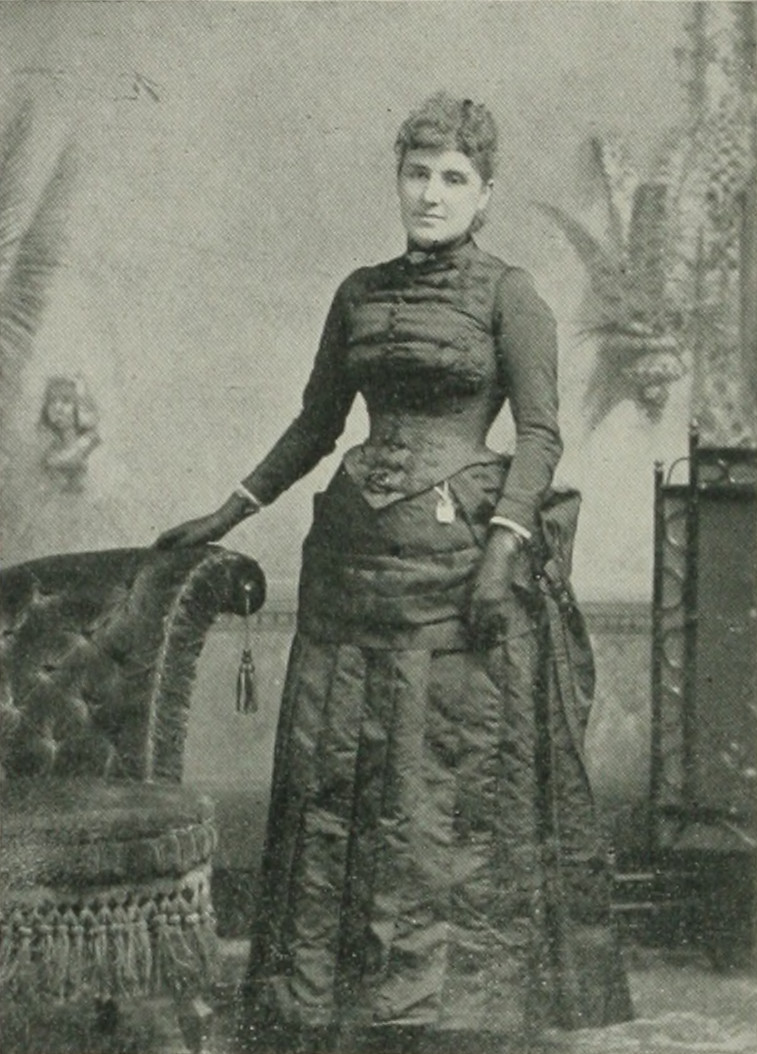
"A Woman of the Century"

Sallie Corbell married Gen. George Pickett on September 15, 1863, a short time after his famous charge at Gettysburg. They had two sons: George Edward Pickett (1864–1911), who died at sea returning from the Philippines on an Army transport ship, and David Corbell Pickett (1866–1874), who died in childhood. When the war was over, fearing retaliation for his hanging of 22 Union soldiers, the general and his wife went to Canada for a year, living at the St. Laurent Hotel in Montreal.

She died on March 22, 1931, and was originally buried at Abbey Mausoleum in Arlington, Virginia, due to the fact that women weren't allowed to be buried in the Confederate section of Hollywood Cemetery in Richmond, Virginia.

== Works ==
- Pickett and His Men (1899)
- Kunnoo Sperits and Others (1900)
- Yule Log (1900)
- Ebil Eye (1901)
- Jinny (1901)
- Digging Through to Manila (1905)
- Literary Hearthstones of Dixie (1912)
- The Bugles of Gettysburg (1913)
- The Heart of a Soldier, As Revealed in the Intimate Letters of Gen'l George E. Pickett, C.S.A. (1913)
- Across My Path: Memories of People I Have Known (1916)
- What Happened to Me … (1917)
- Soldier of the South: General Pickett's War Letters to His Wife (edited by Arthur Crew Inman, 1928)
