= Shad bake =

American culinary tradition

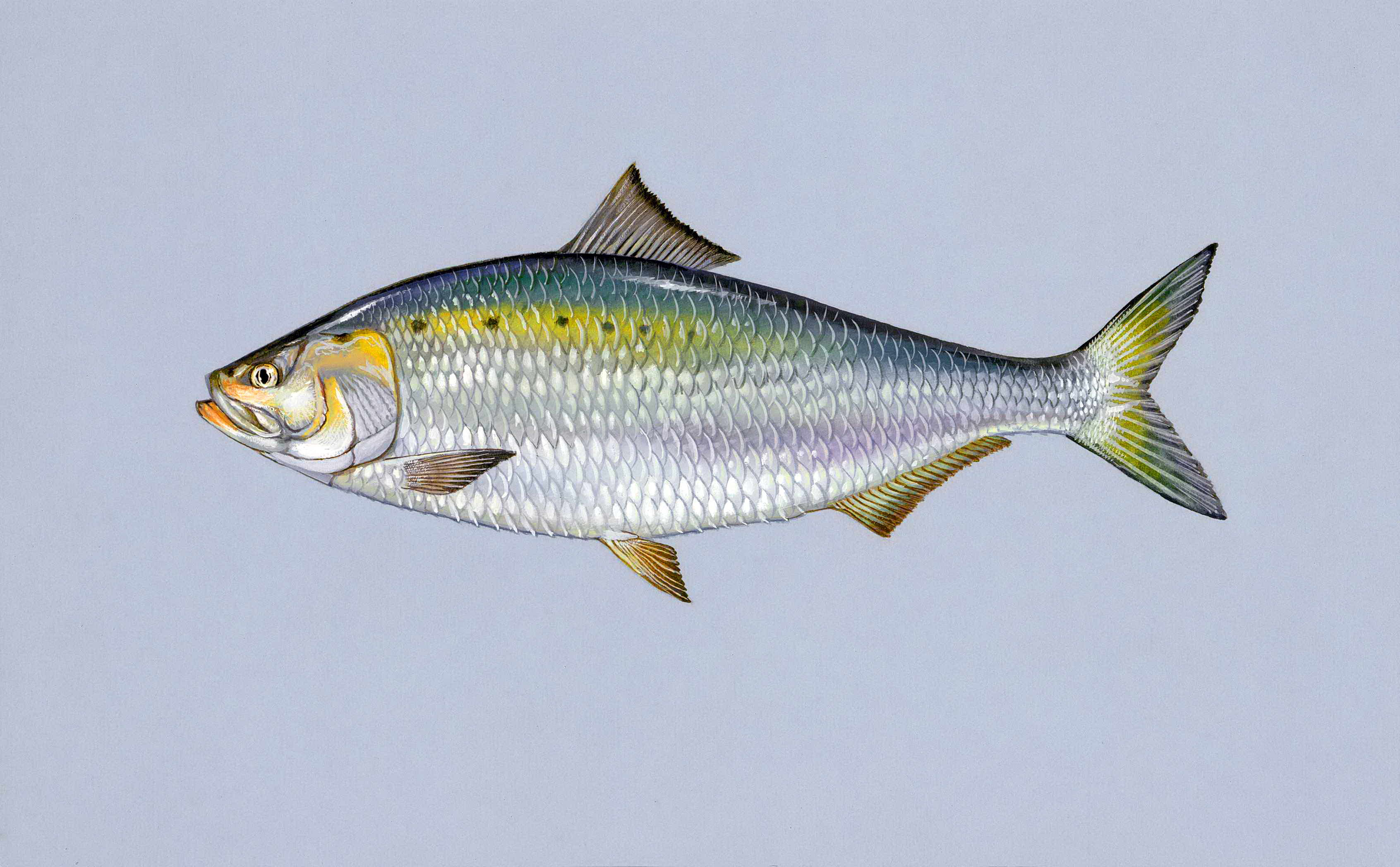
The American shad, Alosa sapidissima

A shad bake, also called a shad roast or shad planking, is a culinary tradition found on the east coast of the United States, particularly associated with the state of Connecticut. Typically occurring in the springtime (when the shad are swimming upriver to spawn and thus are the most available), it consists of nailing American shad fillets to planks of wood and baking them around an open pit fire.

Shad bakes are typically large community-wide events, with some featuring live music, carnival games, historical presentations, and other entertainment. They also in the past were centers for political campaigning, a tradition that still continues with Wakefield, Virginia's annual Shad Planking event.

== Process ==
Called a "dance of heat and timing" and a "culinary jigsaw puzzle" by the BBC, a shad bake is usually led by a "bake-master" or "grill-master." The fish are first deboned using a boning knife, a process that is infamously long and difficult. Once they are deboned, they are nailed to planks of oak (with hickory and cedar also sometimes being used) with roofing nails, and then arranged around an open pit fire. The bake-master uses verbal commands (such as "Board!") to coordinate the removal of finished shad fillets and the addition of new fish. Shad are flavorful enough to not need seasoning, although olive oil and paprika are commonly added either before or after cooking. Some shad bakes re-use the same planks from year to year, believing that the oils and juices accumulate in the wood and give the fish a better flavor.

== History ==
The history of the shad bake most likely goes back to the native Algonquian peoples of the area, who baked shad on either rocks or wooden planks. Recipes for baked shad are found in many colonial-era cookbooks, and it was said to have been a favorite of George Washington (one legend goes that his Continental Army, when encamped and suffering starvation at Valley Forge, were saved by the spring shad spawning). The shad were so plentiful that everyone in riverside communities, regardless of their profession, would take up nets and catch the fish during their spawning run in the spring. The widespread availability of shad lead to the fish being associated with the working poor, leading to a negative reputation in wider society. Servants' contracts limited how often they would eat shad, and there is a story of a prison revolt happening because the prisoners were fed shad every day.

During the American Civil War, Major General George Pickett infamously left his camp unmanaged and under-defended to enjoy a shad bake with fellow officers, leading to his army's defeat at the Battle of Five Forks.

The shad bake seemed to decline during the latter half of the 19th century, but was revived at the turn of the 20th century by the emerging tourism economy. Shad bakes then spread back throughout the East Coast, as a springtime community gathering celebrating an abundant local food source. The title of oldest continuously-running shad bake is claimed by both the Old Saybrook Masons Shad Bake and the Essex Annual Shad Bake, being started in 1950 and 1958 respectively.
