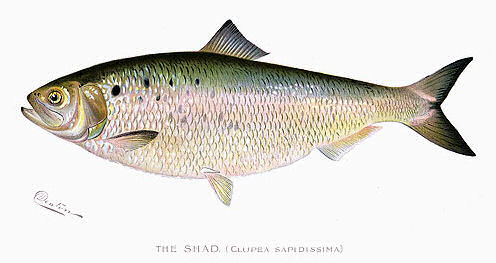
- Watercolor of an American shad by Sherman F. Denton, 1904: The swelling between the anal fin and ventral fin identifies this as a gravid female.

Conservation status
- Least Concern (IUCN 3.1)

Scientific classification
- Kingdom: Animalia
- Phylum: Chordata
- Class: Actinopterygii
- Division: Teleostei
- Order: Clupeiformes
- Family: Alosidae
- Genus: Alosa
- Species: A. sapidissima

Binomial name
- Alosa sapidissima (A. Wilson, 1811)

Synonyms
- Clupea sapidissima

= American shad =

Species of fish

The American shad (Alosa sapidissima) is a species of anadromous clupeid fish naturally distributed on the North American coast of the North Atlantic, from Newfoundland to Florida, and as an introduced species on the North Pacific coast. The American shad is not closely related to the other North American shads. Rather, it seems to form a lineage that diverged from a common ancestor of the European taxa before these diversified.

The American shad has been described as "the fish that fed the (American) nation's founders". Adult shad weigh between 1.5 and 3.5 kg (3 and 8 lb), and they have a delicate flavor when cooked. It is considered flavorful enough not to require sauces, herbs, or spices. It can be boiled, filleted and fried in butter, or baked. Traditionally, a little vinegar is sprinkled over it on the plate. In the Eastern United States, roe shads (females) are prized because the eggs are considered a delicacy.

The name "shad" derives from the Old English sceadd, meaning "herring"; it is a cognate to Irish, Welsh, and Scottish Gaelic words for herring.

== Life history ==
The shad spends most of its life in the Atlantic Ocean but after three to six years they become sexually mature and swim up freshwater rivers to spawn. Northern populations are iteroparous. Thus, they may survive breeding, return to the sea, and then return to fresh waters to spawn several more times. However, southern populations exhibit semelparity, similar to Pacific salmon. In the marine environment, shad are schooling fish. Thousands are often seen at the surface in spring, summer, and autumn. They are hard to find in the winter, as they tend to go deeper before spawning season in the range 13–18 °C (55–64 °F); they have been pulled up in nets as deep as 120 metres (65 fathoms).

Like other herrings, the American shad is primarily a plankton feeder but eats small shrimp and fish eggs. Occasionally, they eat small fish, but these are only a minor item in their general diet.

The sexually mature American shad enter coastal rivers in spring or early summer, usually when the river water has warmed to 10 to 13 °C (50 to 55 °F). Cooler water appears to interrupt the spawn. Consequently, the shad run correspondingly later in the year passing from south to north along the coast, commencing in Georgia in January; in March in the waters tributary to Pamlico and Albemarle Sounds; in April in the Potomac; and in May and June in northern streams generally from Delaware to Canada.

American shad run far upstream in large rivers, such as the Connecticut. The apparent longest distance is in the St. Johns River of Florida, an extremely slow (drops 1 inch per mile, 1.5 cm per km) river that widens into large lakes; shad have been found 600 km (375 mi) upriver.

The spawning fish select sandy or pebbly shallows and deposit their eggs primarily between sundown and midnight. Females release eggs in batches of about 30,000 eggs, though very large fish deposit an estimated as many as 156,000 eggs. Total annual egg production is 200,000–600,000 eggs per female, with larger fish producing more. In rivers north of Cape Fear, the spent fish, now very emaciated, return to the sea immediately after spawning. In southern rivers, most shad die after spawning.

The eggs are transparent, pale pink, or amber, and being semibuoyant and not sticky like those of other herrings, they roll about on the bottom with the current. The eggs hatch in 12 to 15 days at 11 °C (52 °F), in six to eight days at 17 °C (63 °F), which covers the range characteristic of Maine and Bay of Fundy rivers during the season of incubation.

The fry are about 9 to 10 mm (11/32 to 13/32 in) long. Juvenile shad remain in the rivers until fall when they move down to salt water; they are now 40 to 115 mm (1 1/2 to 4 1/2 in) long, resembling their parents in appearance.

== Ecology and diet ==
As adults, shad filter feed at sea and during their return journey to spawn. They are pursued and hunted primarily by striped bass and, at times, harbor seals. They may not actively feed on their return and are caught with special 'dart' lures instead of typical bait.

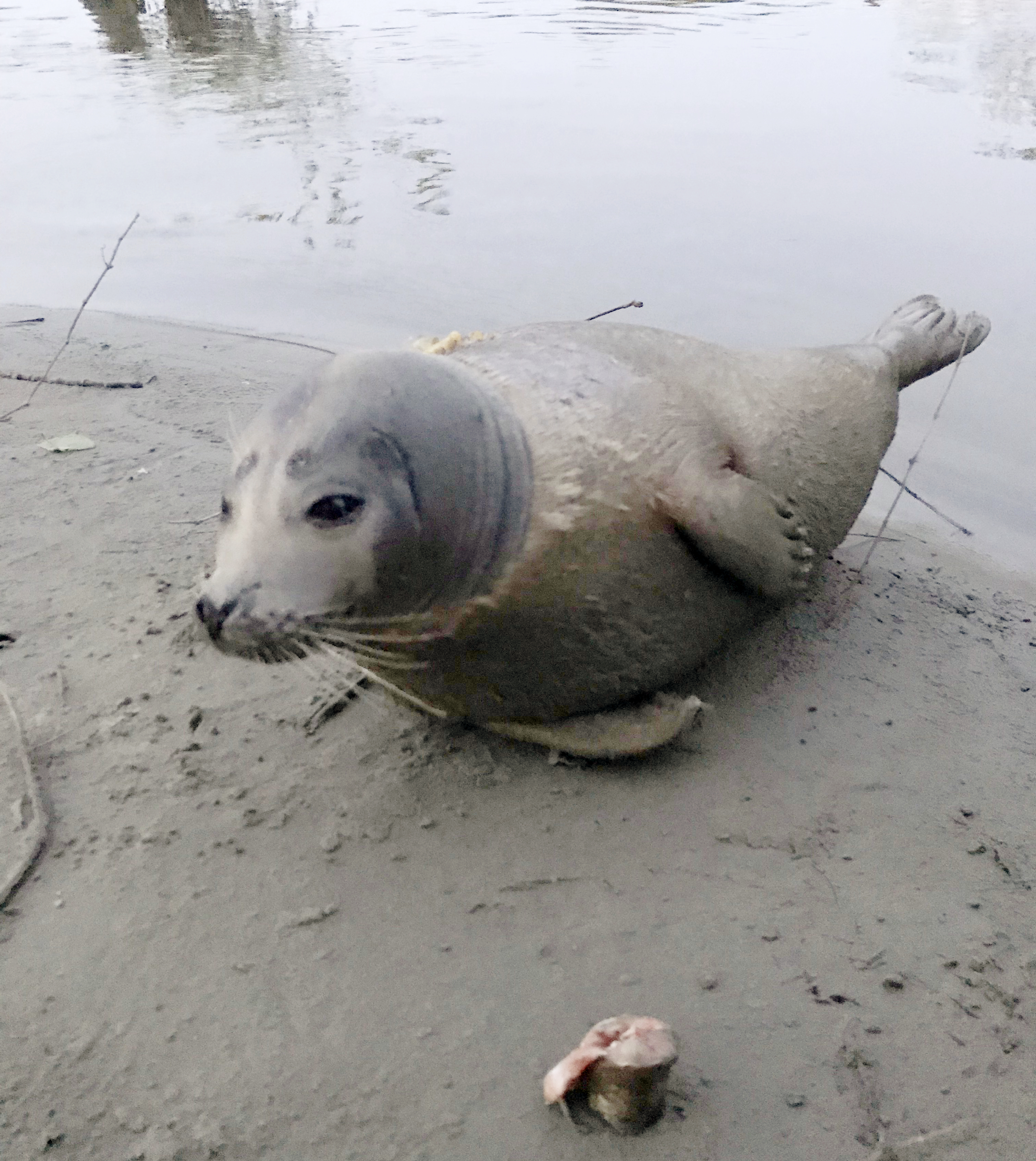
Harbor seal in freshwater Connecticut River, following the shad run

== Specialist hearing ==
While the hearing of most fishes is limited in frequency to less than 1 kHz, American shad demonstrate an unusual ability to detect very high frequency sound (ultrasound) above 50 kHz

== Nutritional information ==
Like most herring species, American shad are very high in omega 3 fatty acids and, in particular, contain nearly twice as much per unit weight as wild salmon. They are also very low in toxins such as PCBs, dioxins, and mercury by EPA estimates. The American or Atlantic shad (A. sapidissima) is a valued food fish.

== Shad populations ==
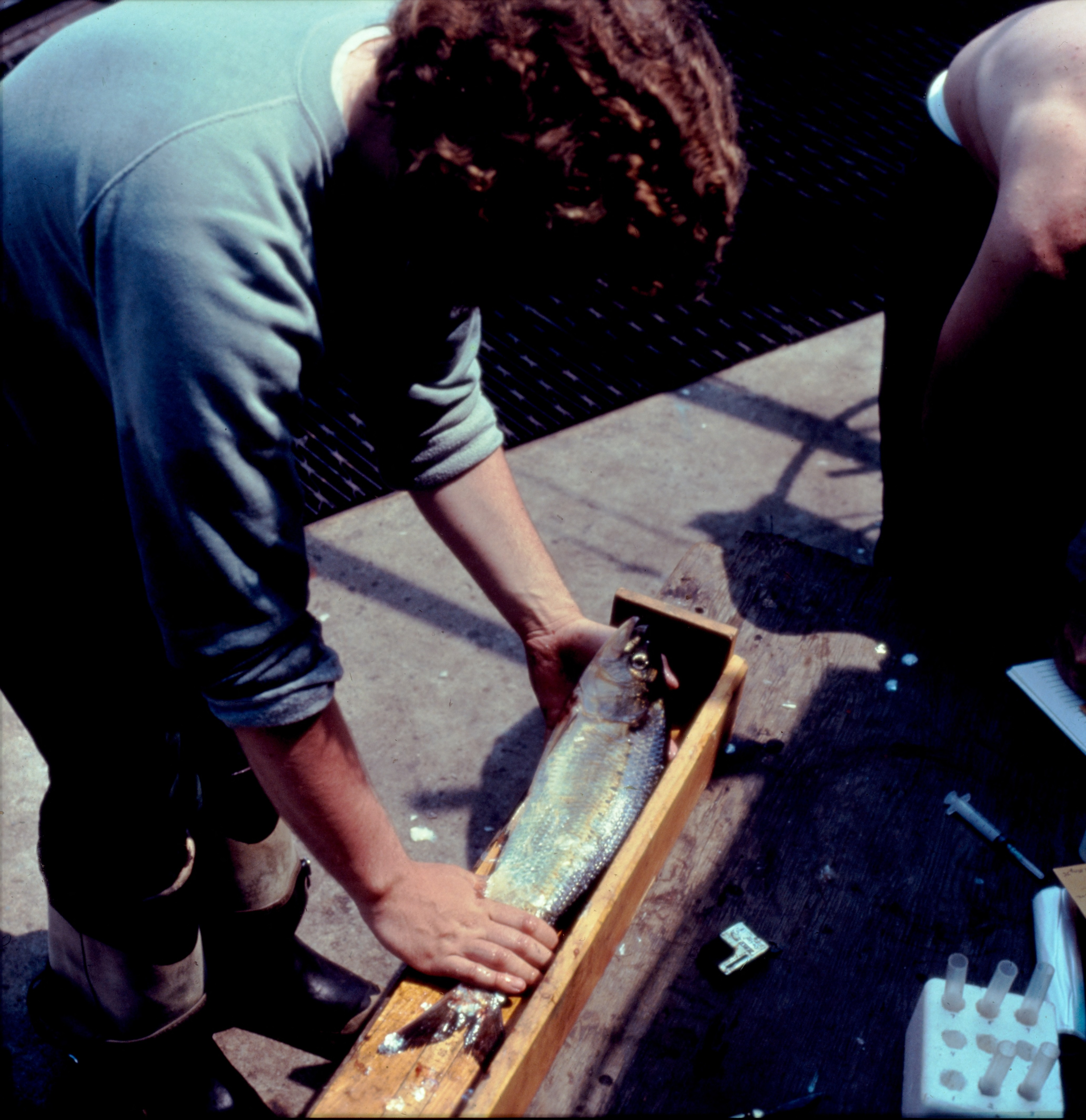
An American shad is measured during a survey at the Holyoke Dam fish ladder, circa 1970

Declines in the Atlantic coast shad population were documented as early as the turn of the 20th century. Traditionally, shad were caught along with salmon in set nets, which were suspended from poles driven into the river bed reasonably close to shore in tidal water. Many of the rivers where shad were once common now suffer from pollution; however, the short time spent by shad in freshwater may minimize contamination. For example, fisheries scientists have found that shad in the Hudson River are not in the river long enough to be affected by PCBs and other contaminants (however, fishing for or possessing American shad [including catch and release] in the Hudson River or Marine District is now prohibited). Pollution, however, may impact shad reproduction and studies have been undertaken to determine whether fingerlings suffer DNA damage.

Most rivers across the historic shad range are now heavily dammed, eliminating many of the spawning grounds. For example, the number of shad harvested in the Merrimack River declined from almost 900,000 in 1789 to none in 1888, likely due to the inability to reach their spawning ground following a period of heavy dam construction. Fish passage efforts, including the Chesapeake Bay program, have begun to remedy this situation. While recreational angling has almost no measurable impact on shad populations, they are susceptible to commercial overfishing. Because of their highly migratory life history and their recreational and commercial importance, American shad are co-managed by the U.S. Fish and Wildlife Service, the National Marine Fisheries Service, and state fisheries agencies. The Atlantic States Marine Fish Commission is a crucial forum for coordinating the collective effort to conserve American shad.

=== Introduced in the North Pacific ===
American shad were introduced into the San Francisco Bay/Sacramento River system in California in the 1800s, and they have spread throughout many river systems on the West Coast of North America. A large shad population occurs in the Columbia River. In recent years, shad counts at Bonneville and The Dalles Dams have ranged from over two million to over five million fish per year. Spawning shad returned to the Columbia in May and June and migrated above Lower Granite Dam on the Snake River and above Priest Rapids Dam on the Upper Columbia. Unlike many introduced species, American shad have not been confirmed to have serious negative effects on the environment or other native fish species in the Columbia.

American shad are also occasionally found on the Northwest Pacific coast in Kamchatka, Russia.

== Shad fishing ==
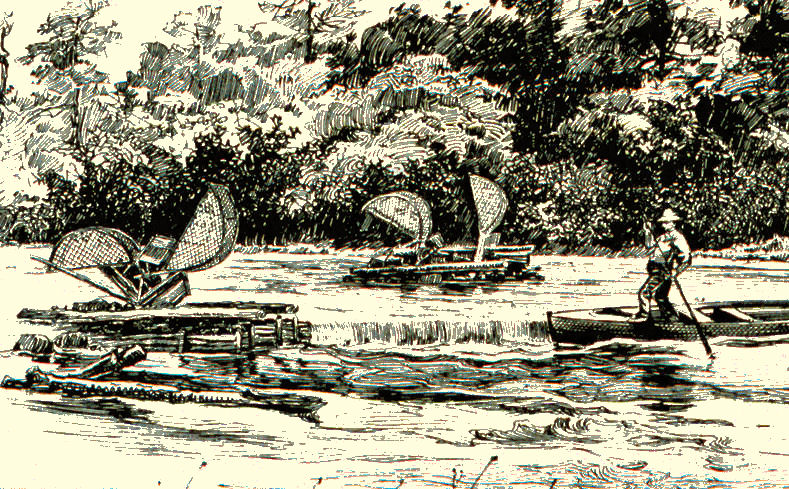
Early 19th-century shad fishing on the Peedee (Greater Pee Dee) River, South Carolina

Shad are also valued as a sport fish that exhibit complex and little-understood feeding behaviors while spawning. Unlike salmon, shad retain the ability to digest and assimilate food during the anadromous migration. Like other fish, turbidity and water temperature can trigger their feeding instinct.

== Society and culture ==
Shad serve notable symbolic roles in regional politics and culture. A shad bake is a culinary tradition found up and down the East Coast, often being large community events. On the year of every gubernatorial election, would-be candidates, lobbyists, campaign workers, and reporters gather in the town of Wakefield, Virginia, for its annual Shad Planking event. Similarly, in Connecticut, the towns of Essex and Windsor hold annual shad festivals. Each spring, the town of Lambertville, New Jersey, on the Delaware River across from New Hope, Pennsylvania, also hosts an annual Shad Festival. There is a multi-day Shad Festival that has been enjoyed by thousands every spring in Grifton, NC for decades. The Salem County New Jersey Attorney Bar Association has held an annual Shad Dinner every spring since the 1940s. There is a shad museum on the Connecticut River in Haddam, Connecticut.

William Penn negotiated with the Lenape for the Schuylkill shad fishing grounds in the 1680s. Shad, he said, were "excellent Pickled or Smoked."

In Quebec, there is a major annual spring shad run in the Rivière-des-Prairies, and many people fish for shad near the Rivière-des-Prairies dam in Laval. The fish is known as saumon des pauvres, or salmon for the poor people.
