= Shad Planking =

Coordinates: 36°57′4″N 77°0′53″W

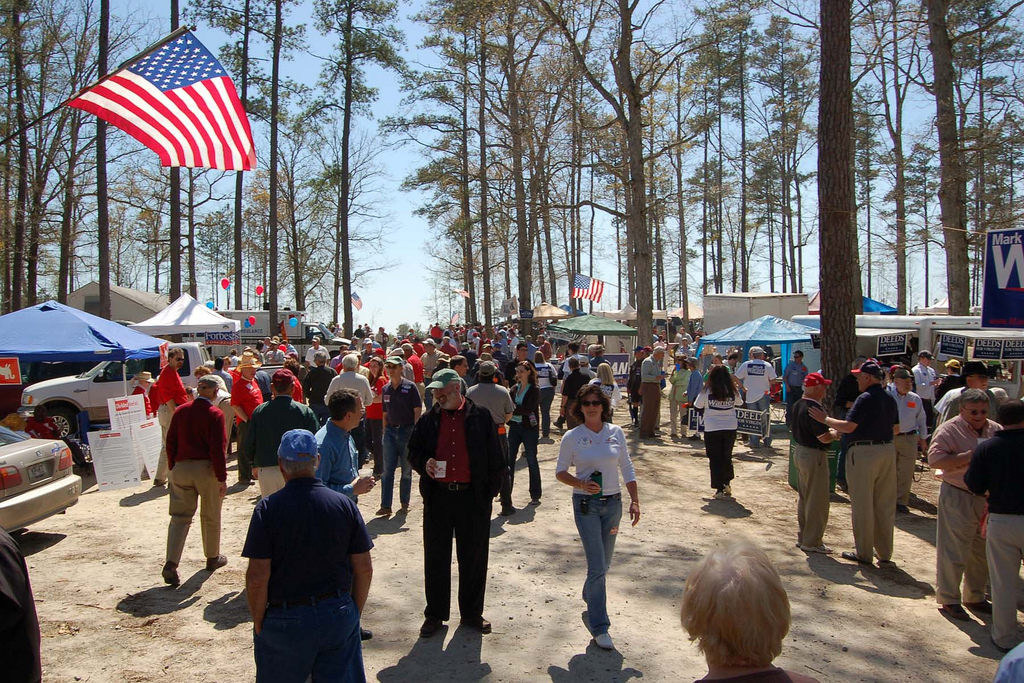
The 2008 Shad Planking event

The Shad Planking was an annual political event in Virginia which took place every April near Wakefield in Sussex County. It was sponsored by a chapter of the Ruritans, a community service organization which was founded in the small town of Holland about 30 miles to the southeast.

Ostensibly an event to celebrate the James River running of shad, the event included a traditional shad bake, where the oily, bony fish were smoked for the occasion on wood planks over an open flame. The events held near Wakefield began after World War II, and were long a function of the state's Conservative Democrats, whose political machine dominated Virginia politics for about 80 years from the late 19th century until the 1960s.

However, both Virginia and the Shad Planking had evolved into a more bipartisan environment by the 1980s. In modern times, would-be candidates, reporters, campaign workers, and locals gathered to eat shad, drink beer, smoke tobacco, and kick off the state's electoral season with lighthearted speeches by politicians in attendance.

Sponsored by the Wakefield Ruritan Club, Shad Planking served as the organizations primary fundraising event for the year. All of the funds raised from the event were invested within the Wakefield Community and support such community organizations as baseball teams, the fire department, and other groups.

The name "The Shad Plank" was adopted by the political blog of the Daily Press newspaper based in Newport News.

== History ==
The traditional event was originally a tribute to the start of the fishing season. The planking dates to the 1930s near Smithfield, Virginia, beginning as a small gathering of friends to celebrate the James River running of shad—the oily, bony fish smoked for the occasion on wood planks over an open flame.

With Dr. Nettles' suggestion and help, the Wakefield Ruritan Club later adopted this time honored tradition as an annual community and fund raising function in 1949. The event has been held on the third Wednesday in April each year ever since to herald the arrival of spring, with attendance increasing in size from the original 300 guests to over 2000 today. The site is the wooded property of a sportsmen's club near U.S. Route 460 near the incorporated town of Wakefield in Sussex County, about an hour southeast of the Virginia State Capitol at Richmond.

Originally a purely social affair, it soon gained a political function, a development credited to State Senator Garland Gray, a local lumberman. In its early years, Democratic party bosses used the Shad Planking (event) as an opportunity to select the next governor. Harry F. Byrd, Sr. and the Byrd Organization dominated Virginia politics into the 1960s. In his 1977 novel, "The Shad Treatment," legal scholar, novelist, and journalist Garrett Epps called the event "a yearly gathering of the white men in Southside [Virginia] -- no blacks, no women allowed -- where the shirt-sleeve politicians . . . gathered to look over the political leadership."

That changed and in later years all were welcome. Many think that in 1977, then-state State Senator L. Douglas Wilder (D) became the first black person to attend. Also that year, Washington Post reporter Megan Rosenfeld was the first woman to attend. Over the years, the gathering evolved into a political gossip festival—a place for candidates to see and be seen and for the curious to speculate about the likely winners and losers of the year's coming campaign season. As Virginia became more Republican after the decline of the Byrd Organization, by the late 20th century, the event became dominated by Republicans. In recent years, especially as the Republicans lost power again after the gubernatorial administration of Jim Gilmore, the Shad Planking saw substantial representation by all parties, including the Libertarian Party.

=== Recent events ===
==== 2005 ====
Republican gubernatorial candidate Jerry Kilgore and his Democratic opponent Tim Kaine spoke at the 2005 Shad Planking. Virginia State Senator Russ Potts was not allowed to speak, so his supporters passed out stickers, "Let Russ Speak". Potts had a bluegrass band "Lagerhead" from Winchester play at his tent. "Go Russ Go" Pott's campaign song was played live at the Shad Planking.

==== 2006 ====
The featured speaker was Attorney General Bob McDonnell.

==== 2007 ====
Lieutenant Governor Bill Bolling, wearing a Virginia Tech tie, was the main speaker. The colors of Virginia Tech were on display, with many attendees wearing Virginia Tech hats and t-shirts, since the event occurred two days after the Virginia Tech massacre. Rather than giving a political speech, Bolling focused on the events at Virginia Tech. Bolling's son graduated from Virginia Tech in 2006.

==== 2008 ====
The 60th annual shad planking was held on April 16, the first anniversary of the Virginia Tech massacre and coincided with the reconvened session of the Virginia General Assembly. The featured speakers were the candidates for Virginia's open U.S. Senate seat, Mark Warner, the Democratic candidate, and Republican contenders Del. Robert G. Marshall and former governor Jim Gilmore.

Each candidate opened with comments on the first anniversary of the Virginia Tech Massacre. Warner spoke of bipartisan cooperation and pledged to become a "radical centrist" if elected. Marshall, who was facing Gilmore for the Republican Party nomination, emphasized his conservative voting record and strong stance against abortion and gay marriage. He also highlighted his role leading the legal challenge to the regional transportation authorities in Hampton Roads and Northern Virginia. Gilmore emphasized his connection to John McCain and Warner's connection to Hillary Clinton and Barack Obama. He characterized Warner as an untrustworthy, "tax-and-spend" liberal who wanted to set a withdrawal date for the war in Iraq.

==== 2009 ====
Wet weather early in the day cleared up before start time but there was a smaller than expected crowd. The featured speakers were the 2009 candidates for governor: Republican Bob McDonnell and Democratic contenders Brian Moran and Terry McAuliffe.

==== 2010 ====
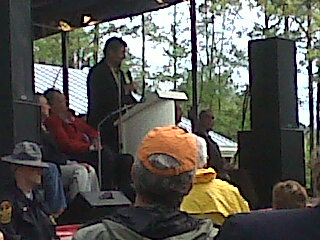
George Allen speaking at the 2010 Shad Planking event

Because of a light rain continuing almost up to time for the speeches to start, the crowd was small. The featured speaker was former United States Senator and former Governor of Virginia George Allen.

==== 2012 ====
An April 20 editorial in The Roanoke Times noted the event's lack of Democrats, but said that didn't mean it was dead: "The only debate possible is over exactly which year the Shad Planking went too far. Was it 2005, when a campaign worker in a duck costume was escorted off the premises by police after complaints that he was being disorderly? Or 2009, when former Democratic National Committee Chairman Terry McAuliffe hogged the camera after spotting a crew from the Sean Hannity Show? No matter which theory you believe, most everyone agrees that Virginia's bony little shad long ago jumped the shark."

==== 2016 ====
2016 brings three major changes to the event:

- The introduction the Grapes and Grains Festival - a showcase of Virginia's best wines
- The creation of the Presidential Straw Poll - a fun and newsworthy way for Virginia to help shape the national political landscape
- The event day is moved from the 3rd Wednesday in April to the following Friday. In 2016, it is on Friday, April 22.

==== 2017 ====
2017 was the final year for Shad Planking.

== See also ==
- Plank cooking
- Pancake breakfast
