= Pickett House (Bellingham, Washington) =

Historic house in Washington, United States

- U.S. National Register of Historic Places
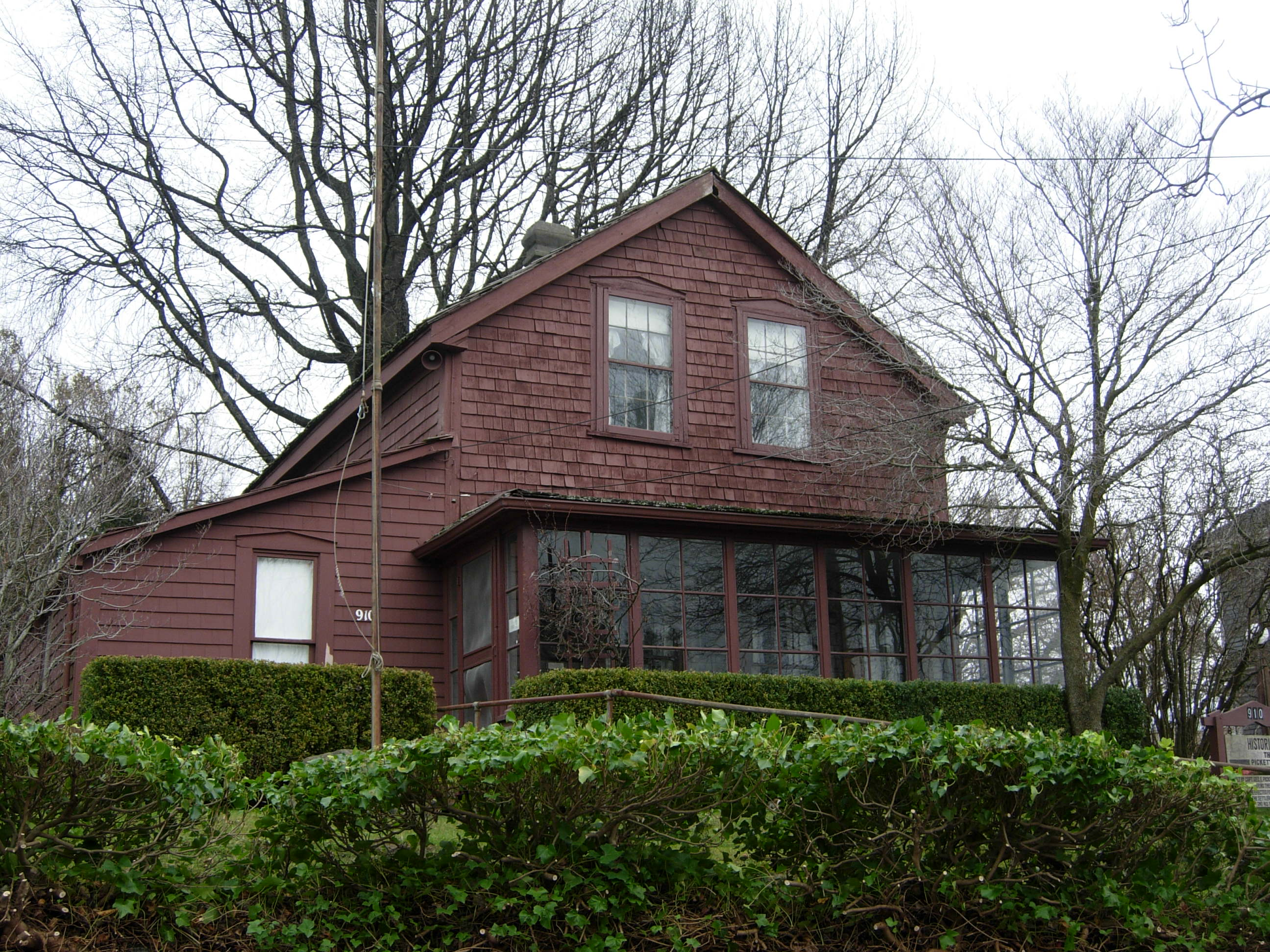

- Location within Washington (state)
- Location: Bellingham, Washington
- Coordinates: 48°45′22″N 122°29′08″W
- Built: 1856
- NRHP reference No.: 71000881
- Added to NRHP: December 13, 1971

The Pickett House is the oldest house in the city of Bellingham, Washington, located on 910 Bancroft Street. Built in 1856 by United States Army Captain George Pickett, who later became a prominent general in the Confederate States Army during the Civil War, the house was listed on the National Register of Historic Places in 1971.

== History ==
After Captain Pickett arrived in Bellingham to oversee construction of Fort Bellingham, he chose a spot on what was then called Peabody Hill in the town of Whatcom to be cleared for his home. The two-story residence was built of lumber milled by the nearby Roeder-Peabody lumber mill on Whatcom Creek. About a year later, the Captain's son, James Tilton Pickett, was born in the house. After Captain Pickett left Bellingham in 1861 to serve in the Civil War, the house changed hands several times before Hattie Strothers left the house to the Washington State Historical Society upon her death in 1936. In 1941, the home became a museum and, later, home to the Daughters of Pioneers; both the museum and the Daughters still occupy the site.

Very few changes have been made to the original structure. A narrow staircase has replaced the original ladder leading to the second-storey bedrooms, and a kitchen has been added to the lean-to section of the house.

== Gallery ==
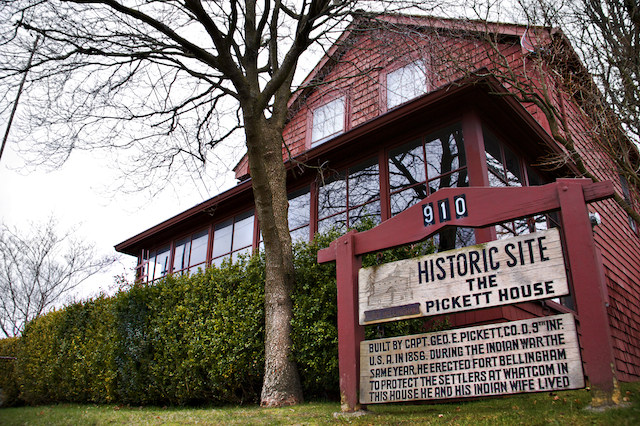
Facade of the Pickett House with sign on 910 Bancroft Street, Bellingham, WA.

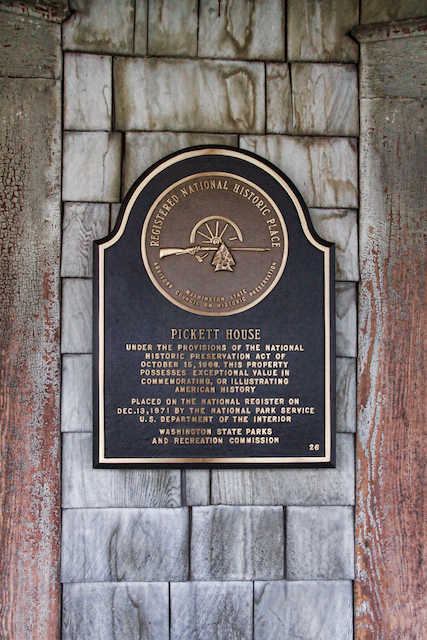
Plaque at the front of the Pickett House

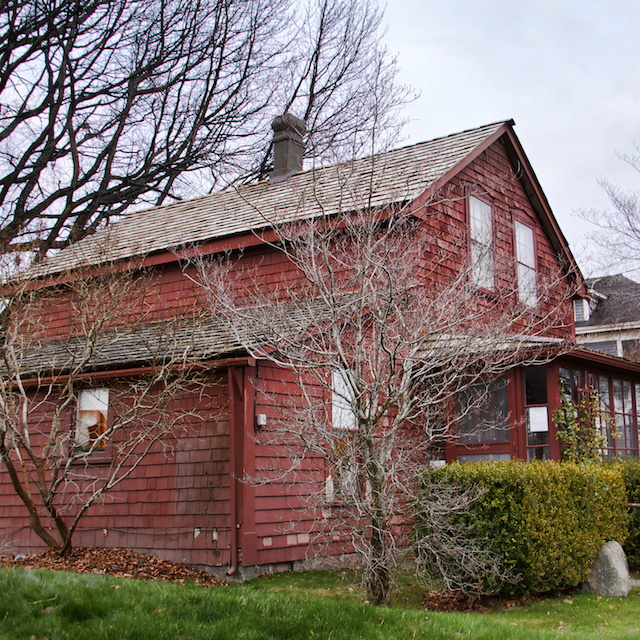
Photo of the Pickett House showing the lean-to section

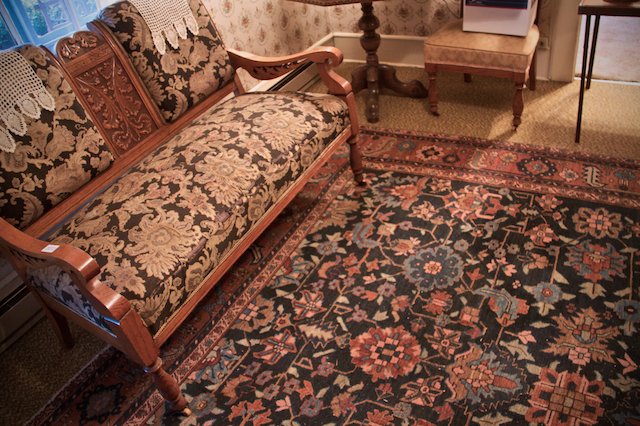
Chair and rug detail from inside the Pickett House

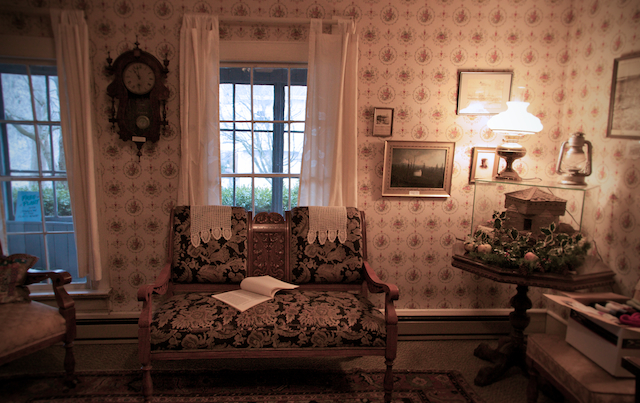
Interior of the Pickett House showing a sofa chair and windows looking out to the front

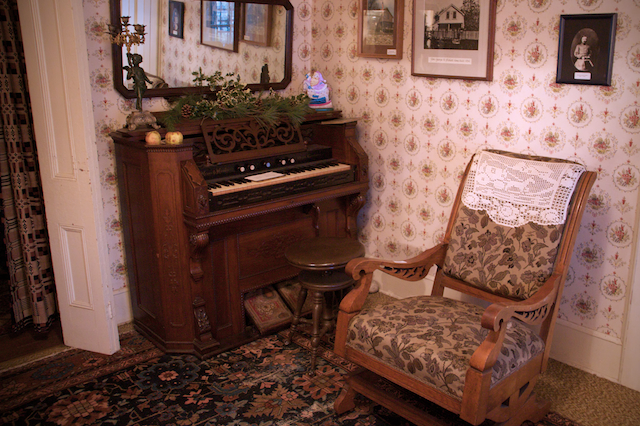
Interior of the Pickett House showing the organ and a rocking chair
