= George Pickett =

Confederate States Army general (1825–1875)

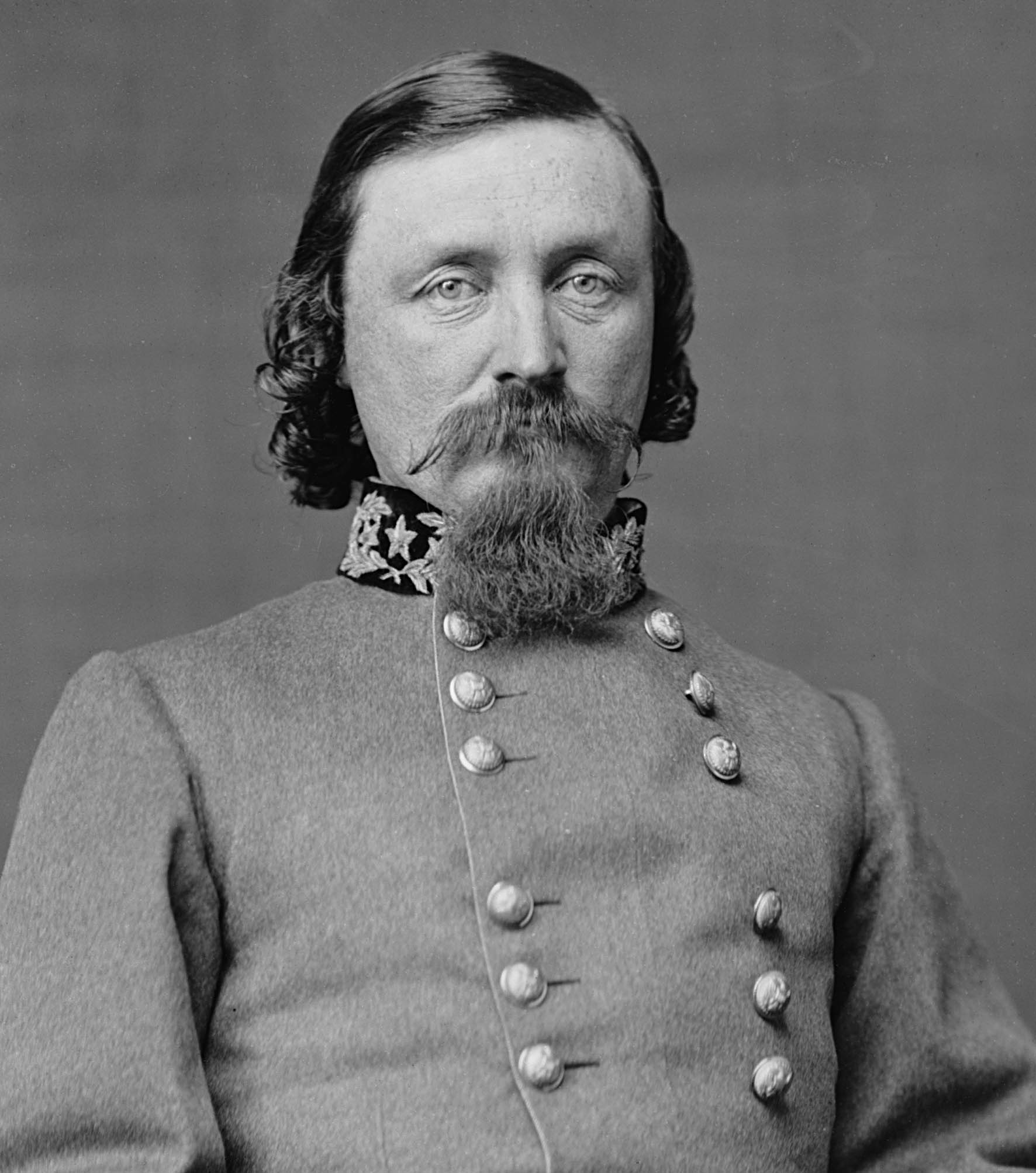
- Pickett, c. 1862
- Born: George Edward Pickett; January 16, 1825; Richmond, Virginia, U.S.
- Died: July 30, 1875 (aged 50); Norfolk, Virginia, U.S.
- Burial place: Hollywood Cemetery, Richmond, Virginia, U.S.
- Relatives: Henry Heth (cousin)
- Military career
- Allegiance: United States; Confederate States
- Branch: United States Army; Confederate States Army
- Service years: 1846–1861 (U.S.); 1861–1865 (C.S.)
- Rank: Captain (USA); Major General (CSA)
- Commands: Pickett's Division, First Corps, Army of Northern Virginia
- Known for: Pickett's Charge
- Battles: See battles: Mexican–American War; Battle of Chapultepec; Pig War; American Civil War; Peninsula Campaign; Battle of Fredericksburg; Siege of Suffolk; Battle of Gettysburg; Pickett's Charge; Second Battle of Petersburg; Battle of Five Forks

Signature
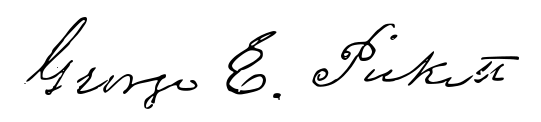

George Edward Pickett (January 16, 1825 – July 30, 1875) was an American military officer who became a major general in the Confederate States Army during the American Civil War. He is best remembered for being one of the commanders at Pickett's Charge, the futile and bloody Confederate offensive on the third day of the Battle of Gettysburg that bears his name.

Pickett graduated last out of 59 cadets in the United States Military Academy class of 1846. He served as a second lieutenant in the United States Army during the Mexican–American War and is noted for his service in the Battle of Chapultepec in September 1847. After this, he served in the Washington Territory and eventually reached the rank of captain. Pickett participated in the Pig War of 1859. Near the beginning of the American Civil War, he was commissioned in the Confederate States Army, and attained the rank of brigadier general in January 1862. He commanded a brigade that saw heavy action during the Peninsula Campaign of 1862. Pickett was wounded at the Battle of Gaines's Mill on June 27.

He returned to command in September, following the Battle of Antietam, when he was given command of a division in the Right Wing of the Army of Northern Virginia, in the command of Major General James Longstreet, which became the I Corps that December. His division was lightly engaged at the Battle of Fredericksburg and, along with most of Longstreet's Corps, missed the Battle of Chancellorsville while participating in the Suffolk Campaign in 1863. During the Gettysburg campaign, his division was, much to Pickett's frustration, the last to arrive on the field. However, it was one of three divisions under the command of General Longstreet to participate in a disastrous assault on Union positions on July 3, the final day of the battle. The attack has been given the name "Pickett's Charge". In February 1864, Pickett ordered 22 North Carolinians in Union uniform hanged as deserters after a failed assault on New Bern. His military career came to an inglorious end when his division was overwhelmed and defeated at the Battle of Five Forks.

Following the war, Pickett feared prosecution for his execution of deserters and temporarily fled to Canada. An old Army friend, Ulysses S. Grant, interceded on his behalf, and he returned to Virginia in 1866. He could not rejoin the Army, so he tried his hand at farming, then selling insurance. He died at age 50 in July 1875 from an "abscess of the liver".

== Early life and education ==
George Edward Pickett was born in his grandfather's shop in Richmond, Virginia, on January 16, 1825, and raised on his family's plantation at Turkey Island, where dozens of people enslaved by the Pickett family worked. He was the first of the eight children of Robert and Mary Pickett, a prominent old Virginia family of English and French Huguenot origins. He was a cousin of future Confederate general Henry Heth.

For a time in the 1840s, Pickett lived and served as a law clerk for his uncle Andrew Johnston in Quincy, Illinois. He went to Springfield, Illinois, to study law, but at the age of 17 he was appointed to the United States Military Academy. Legend has it that Pickett's appointment was secured for him by Abraham Lincoln, but this is largely believed to be a story circulated by his widow following his death. Lincoln, as an Illinois state legislator at the time, could not nominate candidates, although he did give the young man advice after he was accepted. In fact, Pickett was appointed by Illinois Congressman John T. Stuart, a friend of Pickett's uncle and a law partner of Lincoln.

Pickett was popular as a cadet at West Point. He was mischievous and a player of pranks, "a man of ability, but belonging to a cadet set that appeared to have no ambition for class standing and wanted to do only enough study to secure their graduation." At a time when often a third of the class left before graduation, Pickett persisted, working off his demerits and doing enough in his studies to graduate, ranking last of the 59 surviving students in the Class of 1846. It is a position held with some backhanded distinction, referred to today as the "goat", for both its stubbornness and tenacity. Ordinarily, such a showing would be a ticket to an obscure posting and a dead-end career, but Pickett, like George Armstrong Custer a generation later, had the fortune to graduate just as a war broke out, resulting in a sudden need for many junior army officers. Pickett's cousin Henry Heth graduated last in the Class of 1847.

== Early career ==
July 1, 1846, Pickett was commissioned a brevet second lieutenant in the 8th Infantry Regiment. He soon gained national recognition in the Mexican–American War when he carried the American colors over the parapet during the Battle of Chapultepec in September 1847. Wounded at the base of the wall, Pickett's friend and colleague Lieutenant James Longstreet handed him the colors. Pickett carried the flag over the wall and fought his way to the roof of the palace, unfurling it over the fortress and announcing its surrender. He received a second brevet promotion, to captain, following this action. His record of service, compiled by the Adjutant-General's Office in March 1887 at the request of his widow, states: Brevetted first lieutenant August 20, 1847, "for gallant and meritorious conduct in the battles of Contreras, and Churubusco, Mexico"; and captain September 13, 1847, "for gallant and meritorious conduct at Chapultepec, Mexico."

June 28, 1849, while serving on the Texas frontier after the war, he was promoted to first lieutenant and then to captain in the 9th Infantry Regiment March 3, 1855. In 1853, Pickett challenged a fellow junior officer, future Union general Winfield Scott Hancock, to a duel; (they had met only briefly when Hancock was passing through Texas). Hancock declined the duel, a response not unlikely as dueling had fallen out of favor at the time. In January 1851, Pickett married Sally Harrison Minge, the daughter of Dr. John Minge of Virginia, the great-great-grandniece of President William Henry Harrison, and the great-great-granddaughter of Benjamin Harrison V, a signer of the United States Declaration of Independence. Sally died during childbirth that November, at Fort Gates, Texas.

Pickett next served in the Washington Territory. In 1856 he commanded the construction of Fort Bellingham on Bellingham Bay, in what is today the city of Bellingham, Washington. He also built a frame home that year which still stands; Pickett House is the oldest house in Bellingham and the oldest house on its original foundation in the Pacific Northwest. While posted to Fort Bellingham, Pickett married a Native American woman of the Haida tribe, Morning Mist, who gave birth to a son, James Tilton Pickett (1857–1889); Morning Mist died a few months later. "Jimmy" Pickett made a name for himself as a newspaper artist, before dying of tuberculosis at the age of 32 near Portland, Oregon.

In mid-1859 Pickett became involved in the Pig War. On June 15, 1859, American farmer Lyman Cutlar on San Juan Island shot a pig owned by a Hudson's Bay Company (HBC) employee. Nearby British colonial authorities responded by threatening to arrest Cutlar and evict the American settlers on the island, resulting in a settler delegation requesting military protection from Brigadier General William S. Harney, the commander of the Department of Oregon. Harney ordered Pickett to lead his unit, Company D of the 9th Regiment of U.S. Infantry, to the island. Pickett and his 64-man unit landed on the island on July 27 and established a camp near the HBC wharf on Griffin Bay, just north of Belle Vue Sheep Farm.

In response to American landing, the governor of Vancouver Island James Douglas sent the 31-gun frigate HMS Tribune under Captain Geoffrey Hornby to the island with orders to dislodge Pickett's force. However, as reinforcements sent by Harney had not arrived Hornby refused to take action against Pickett's small force and waited until Rear-admiral Robert Lambert Baynes arrived at the region. On August 10, Pickett was reinforced by 171 troops under Lieutenant Colonel Silas Casey who assumed overall command of the American forces on the island and went with Pickett to negotiate with Baynes aboard his flagship, the 84-gun ship of the line HMS Ganges, off Victoria, British Columbia.

After initial tensions passed the crisis was averted, both sides being unwilling to go to war over a pig. President James Buchanan dispatched Brevet Lieutenant General Winfield Scott to negotiate a settlement between the parties. There is also some controversy that Pickett and Harney, per General Granville O. Haller, maneuvered behind the scenes to provoke a war between the United States and Britain, to distract the North, allowing the South to seek independence or, as General George B. McClellan said, to unite the North and South.

== American Civil War ==
=== Early assignments ===
On April 19, after the firing on Battle of Fort Sumter and in response to President Lincoln's call for 75,000 volunteers to suppress the rebellion, Virginia joined three more Southern states in seceding from the Union. In response, Pickett sailed from San Juan Island to Bellingham, Washington, then to Fort Steilacoom, where he submitted his resignation on June 25, and embarked on the long journey home. At San Francisco, he boarded a steamer and sailed to the Isthmus of Panama, trekked 40 miles overland to Colon, caught another ship to New York City, before making his way to Virginia where he was commissioned as a major in the Confederate States Army Artillery. Within a month he was appointed colonel in command of the Rappahannock Line of the Department of Fredericksburg, Virginia, under the command of Major General Theophilus H. Holmes. Holmes's influence obtained a commission for Pickett as a brigadier general, dated January 14, 1862.

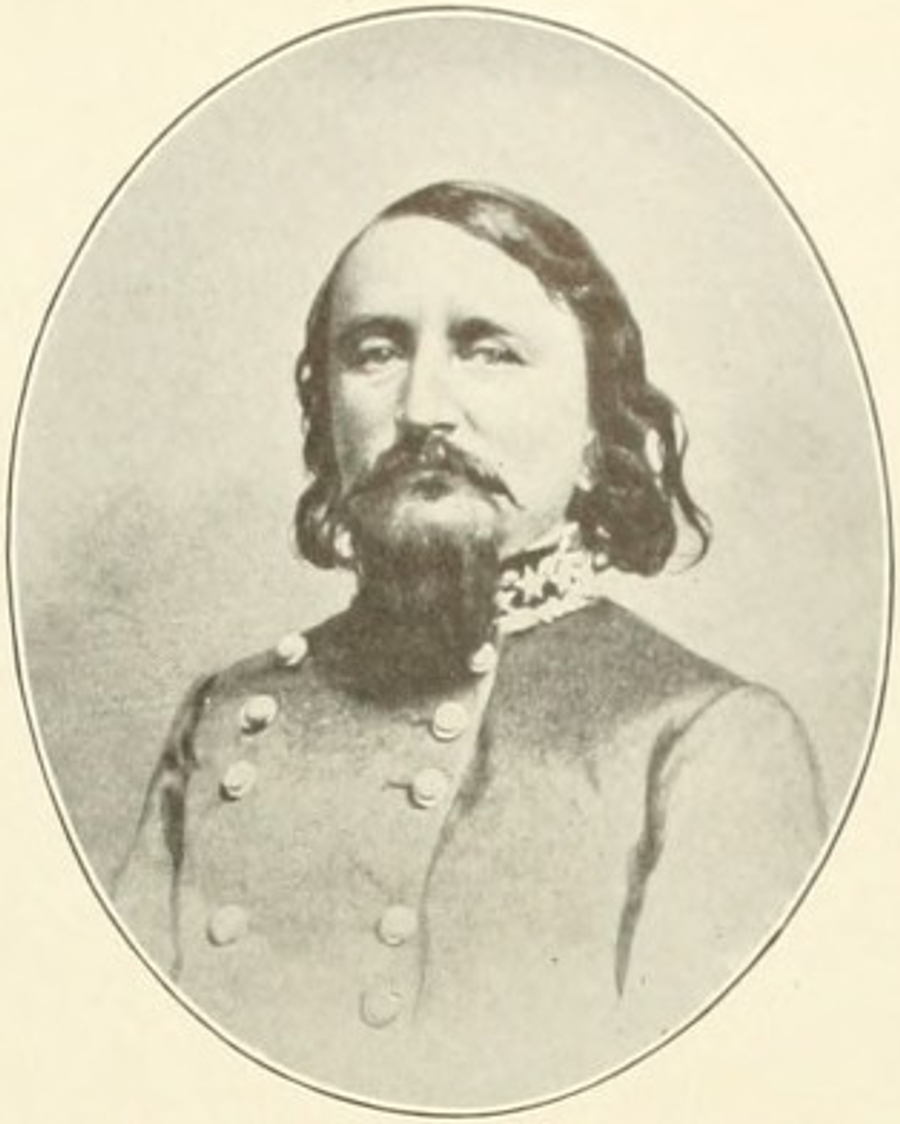
Confederate Major General George E. Pickett

Pickett made a colorful general. He rode a sleek black charger named "Old Black", and wore a small blue kepi-style cap, with buffed gloves over the sleeves of a tailored uniform that had a double row of gold buttons on the coat, and gold spurs on his polished boots. He held a riding crop whether mounted or walking. His moustache drooped beyond the corners of his mouth and then turned upward at the ends. His hair was the talk of the Army: "long ringlets flowed loosely over his shoulders, trimmed and highly perfumed, his beard likewise was curling and giving up the scent of Araby."

Pickett's first combat command was during the Peninsula Campaign, leading a brigade that was nicknamed the Gamecocks (the brigade would eventually be led by Richard B. Garnett in Pickett's Charge). Pickett led his brigade ably in the battles of Williamsburg and Seven Pines, earning commendations from his superiors. At Gaines's Mill on June 27 he was shot off his horse while leading his brigade in its first assault. Pickett continued to move forward with his men for a while, leading his horse on foot. A second assault by Pickett's brigade, led by Colonel Eppa Hunton, along with the brigade led by Cadmus M. Wilcox, broke the Union line. Pickett feared that he had taken a mortal blow to his shoulder, but the wound was initially assessed by others as minor. The shoulder wound turned out to be severe enough that, though it was not fatal, Pickett was out of action for the next three months, and his arm would remain stiff for at least a year.

When Pickett returned to the Army in September 1862, following the Battle of Antietam, he was given command of a two-brigade division in the corps commanded by his old colleague from Mexico, Major General Longstreet. Pickett was promoted to major general on October 10. Shortly afterwards his division was upgraded to five brigades, commanded by Generals Garnett, James L. Kemper, Lewis Armistead, Montgomery Dent Corse and Micah Jenkins. The division was only lightly engaged at the Battle of Fredericksburg in December.

=== Suffolk and courtship ===
Longstreet and two of his divisions—those commanded by Pickett and John Bell Hood—were detached from Lee's main army in April while participating in the Suffolk Campaign. They thus missed the Battle of Chancellorsville. The Suffolk Campaign was minor and inconclusive, while the Battle of Chancellorsville was an enormous Confederate victory.

Before the Gettysburg Campaign, Pickett fell in love with a Virginia teenager, LaSalle "Sallie" Corbell (1843–1931), commuting back and forth from his duties in Suffolk to be with her. Although Sallie would later insist that she met him in 1852 (at age 9), she did not marry the 38-year-old widower until November 13, 1863. The couple had two children, George Edward Pickett, Jr. (born July 17, 1864) and David Corbell Pickett (born 1865 or 1866). David died in late 1873 or January 1874 of measles.

At Suffolk, Longstreet grew impatient with Pickett's frequent trips away from his division to see Sallie at her home in nearby Chuckatuck. Pickett then decided to ask for permission for the visits from Longstreet's chief of staff, G. Moxley Sorrel, who referred him to Longstreet. Instead of asking Longstreet, Pickett went without permission. After the war, Sorrel commented, "I don't think his division benefitted by such carpet-knight doings in the field."

=== Gettysburg and Pickett's Charge ===
Pickett's division arrived at the Battle of Gettysburg on the evening of the second day, July 2, 1863. It was reduced to three brigades present, Corse's still being detached in Virginia and Jenkins' transferred. It had been delayed by the assignment of guarding the Confederate lines of communication through Chambersburg, Pennsylvania. After two days of heavy fighting, General Robert E. Lee's Army of Northern Virginia, which had initially driven the Union Army of the Potomac to the high ground south of Gettysburg, had been unable to dislodge the Union soldiers from their position. Lee's plan for July 3 called for a massive assault on the center of the Union lines on Cemetery Ridge, based on the assumption that Meade had concentrated his forces to protect his flanks while leaving his center weak. Lee directed General Longstreet to assemble a force of three divisions for the attack—two divisions from the corps of Lieutenant General A. P. Hill, under the temporary command of J. Johnston Pettigrew and Major General Isaac R. Trimble, which had both seen action on July 1, and Pickett's fresh division from Longstreet's own corps. The center was occupied by the Union II Corps, commanded by Major General Winfield Scott Hancock. Longstreet was technically in command, not Pickett. Nevertheless, the attack became known as "Pickett's Charge". In addition, much of the mythology of the Charge arose from newspaper reports. As Pickett was the only major general from Virginia to participate in the charge, the Virginia newspapers both played up their native son's role and made the assault a more "glamorous" event.

Following a two-hour artillery barrage meant to soften up the Union defenses, the three divisions stepped off across open fields almost a mile from Cemetery Ridge. Pickett inspired his men by shouting, "Up, men, and to your posts! Let no man forget today that you are from Old Virginia." Pickett's division, with the brigades of Brigadier Generals Armistead, Garnett, and Kemper, was on the right flank of the assault. It received punishing artillery fire, and then volleys of massed musket fire as it approached its objective. Armistead's brigade made the farthest progress through the Union lines. Armistead was mortally wounded, falling near "The Angle", at what is now termed the "high-water mark of the Confederacy". Neither of the other two divisions made comparable progress across the fields; Armistead's success was not reinforced, and his men were quickly killed or captured.

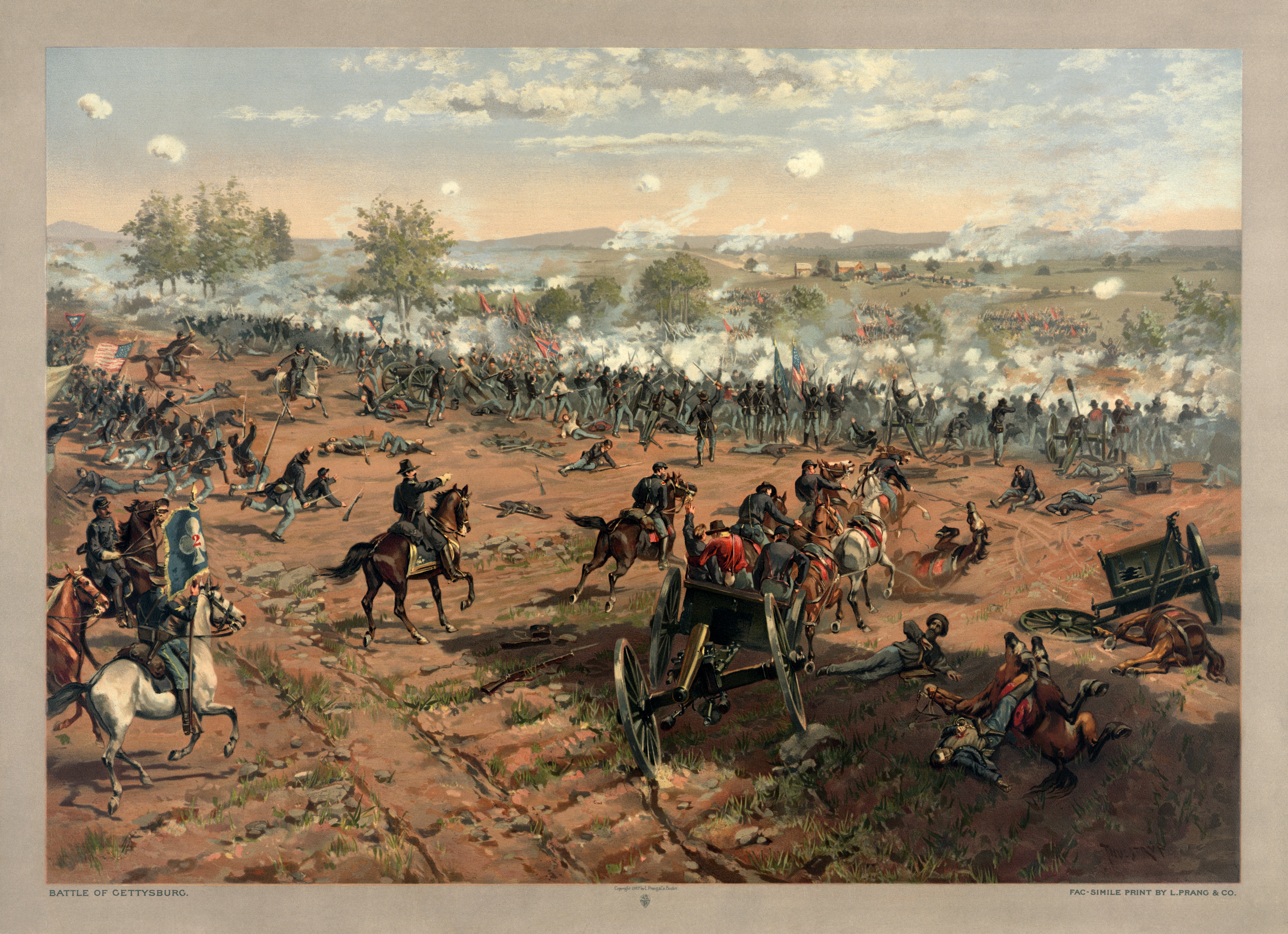
Thure de Thulstrup's Battle of Gettysburg, showing Pickett's Charge.

Pickett's Charge was a bloodbath. While the Union suffered 1,500 casualties, the Confederates had over 6,000. Over 50% of the men sent across the fields were killed or wounded. Pickett's division alone, out of about 5,500 men, 224 were killed, 1,140 wounded, and 1,499 missing/captured. Pickett's three brigade commanders and all thirteen of his regimental commanders were casualties. Kemper was wounded, Garnett killed, and Armistead mortally wounded. Trimble and Pettigrew were the most senior casualties of the entire Confederate assault, the former losing a leg and the latter wounded in the hand and later mortally wounded during the retreat to Virginia. Pickett has received some historical criticism for establishing his final position well to the rear of his troops. Thomas R. Friend, who served Pickett as a courier, defended Pickett by writing that he "went as far as any Major General, commanding a division, ought to have gone, and farther."

As soldiers straggled back to the Confederate lines along Seminary Ridge, Lee feared a Union counteroffensive and tried to rally his center, telling returning soldiers that the failure was "all my fault." Pickett was inconsolable. When Lee told Pickett to rally his division for the defense, Pickett allegedly replied, "General Lee, I have no division." Pickett's official report for the battle has never been found. While it is rumored that Lee rejected it for its bitter negativity and demanded that it be rewritten, an updated version was never filed.

=== Department of Southern Virginia and North Carolina ===
After the Battle of Gettysburg, Pickett commanded the Department of Southern Virginia and North Carolina. In February, Pickett was ordered to capture New Bern, North Carolina, from Federal forces. The subsequent Battle of New Bern resulted in a Confederate defeat. Following the battle, Pickett ordered the execution of 22 United States Army soldiers of the 2nd North Carolina Union Volunteer Infantry Regiment who were captured during the failed raid. Confederates claimed they were merely executing deserters. In fact many of the US soldiers put to death offered good evidence that they refused service in the Confederate States Army, serving only in the North Carolina home guard on the basis of refusing to take up arms against the United States. One of the executed soldiers was just 15 years old.

After the war Pickett fled to Canada to escape an investigation into the executions, but he returned to the United States after being promised by General Grant, to public controversy, that he would not face prosecution.

=== Overland Campaign and Siege of Petersburg ===
Following the New Bern battle, Pickett served as a division commander in the Defenses of Richmond. After P. G. T. Beauregard bottled up Benjamin Butler in the Bermuda Hundred Campaign, Pickett's division was detached in support of Robert E. Lee's operation in the Overland Campaign, just before the Battle of Cold Harbor, in which Pickett's division occupied the center of the defensive line, a place in which the main Union attack did not occur. His division participated in the Siege of Petersburg.

=== Battle of Five Forks ===
General Pickett had received orders from Robert E. Lee to, with the Cavalry divisions of Major Generals William Henry Fitzhugh Lee and Thomas L. Rosser, hold the vital railroad crossing at Five Forks at all costs. On April 1, at the Battle of Five Forks, their troops were attacked by a combined force under Major General Philip Henry Sheridan, which consisted of the V Corps of the Army of the Potomac, commanded by Major General Gouverneur K. Warren, and the Cavalry Corps of the Army, commanded by Brigadier General Wesley Merritt. Pickett, W.H.L. Lee, and Rosser were located behind the lines of their troops at the time of the attack, enjoying a shad bake while failing to inform their subordinate officers of their location. Meanwhile, Warren's troops overwhelmed Pickett's left flank, and the Cavalry troops pinned the Confederates down elsewhere. By the time the Confederate commanders realized the catastrophe, it was too late to prevent the defeat. The result of the battle, as well as that of the Third Battle of Petersburg the following day, forced Lee to abandon his entrenchments at Petersburg, leading to the capture of Richmond and surrender of his army on April 9.

=== Relief controversy ===
A controversy existed over whether Pickett was relieved of his command in the final days of the war. After the war, Lee's Chief of Staff, Lieutenant Colonel Walter H. Taylor, wrote that following the Battle of Sayler's Creek on April 6, 1865, he had issued orders for Lee relieving Major Generals Richard H. Anderson and Bushrod Johnson, whose forces had been lost in the battle and who thereby no longer had troops under their command. In fact, Anderson had returned to his home in South Carolina following the battle. In addition, Taylor recollected that he had issued an order relieving Pickett as well. Pickett's division was still intact, though reduced in number to about the size of a brigade. No copies of these orders exist. Douglas Southall Freeman, a biographer of Lee, supported this assertion, writing in 1935 that at the same time Lee relieved Anderson of command, he took the same action regarding Pickett and Bushrod Johnson, but the order regarding Pickett apparently never reached him. As late as April 11, he signed himself, "Maj. Genl. Commdg."

In contradiction to this assertion, in his 1870 book Pickett's Men Walter Harrison reprinted an order from Lieutenant Colonel Taylor to Pickett dated April 10, 1865, in which Taylor addressed Pickett as "Maj Gen G E Picket [sic], General Commanding" The order was a request for an account of the movements and actions of Pickett's Division from the time of the Battle of Five Forks on April 1 to the surrender at Appomattox on April 9. In the report Pickett submitted, he said:

The second day after the battle referred to (Five Forks) not being able to find General Anderson's headquarters, I reported to Lieut. Gen. Longstreet, and continued to receive orders from him until the army was paroled and disbursed."

Pickett's official report to Taylor was signed "G.E. Pickett, Major-Gen., Commd'g." This is the April 11 report mentioned by Freeman above. Thus in Pickett's official report to Taylor he speaks of commanding his men and interacting with his superior officer right up until the surrender at Appomattox. Taylor attempted to explain the apparent contradiction by telling Fitzhugh Lee that he addressed his request in the manner he did because Pickett was not dismissed from the Army, and for the period in question, Pickett was initially in command. This explanation, however, leaves unanswered the question of how Taylor expected Pickett to answer for the period of time Pickett purportedly was not in command. The explanation does not explain Pickett's report which covered the entire period, nor the fact that Pickett signed the report as the acting commander, nor did it explain Longstreet's interactions with Pickett over this period of time. Furthermore, there is no record of Taylor requesting reports from any other officers dismissed from the service on the movements of their former troops, nor of his referring to such officers in a manner which would connote active command.

The medical officer of Pickett's division, Dr. M. G. Elzey, was with Pickett at the time of these events. When an elderly Colonel John S. Mosby raised this issue in 1911, Elzey wrote a letter to the Richmond Times-Dispatch in answer to Mosby:

I was General Pickett's personal medical advisor, and continued to be such until the time of his death. We rode together a greater part of the way during the retreat of our army from Petersburg to Appomattox. We escaped together from the battlefield at Sailor's Creek and were constantly together until we reached Appomattox. I repeat it, therefore, with all confidence, that I am a competent witness to the fact that he was never under arrest, but remained in command of his Division until the last scene at Appomattox. M. G. Elzey

In Longstreet's final report, he makes no mention of Pickett or his division. Nor does Longstreet mention any other officer being in charge of the unit, nor Pickett commanded the men remaining in his division and reported to Longstreet. These men surrendered with Pickett at Appomattox. Regarding Pickett and his division, no source can be produced which asserts anything otherwise.

=== Appomattox ===
On April 9, Pickett commanded his remaining troops in the Battle of Appomattox Courthouse, forming up in the final battle line of the Army of Northern Virginia. He surrendered with Lee's army and was paroled at Appomattox Court House on April 12, 1865.

A legend told by Pickett's widow stated that when the Union Army marched into Richmond, President Abraham Lincoln came with it and visited the Pickett house. Allegedly he had come to determine the fate of an old acquaintance from before the war, and Sallie, astonished, admitted she was Pickett's wife and held out her infant for the president to cradle. Lincoln historian Gerald J. Prokopowicz has called this story a "fantasy".

== Later life ==
Pickett's execution of 22 captured Union Army soldiers, from North Carolina at New Bern, was then under investigation. Pickett, fearing prosecution, fled with his wife and son to Canada. Testimony at the hearings, including that of wartime North Carolina Governor Zebulon Vance, alleged that at least some of the executed men had belonged to local militias and been unwillingly transferred to the regular Confederate army in "violation of their enlistment agreement," and thus should not have been treated as deserters and shot. Pickett remained out of the country for a year until hearing that, at the recommendation of Ulysses S. Grant, the investigation had ended. Pickett returned to the United States with his family in 1866 to work as an insurance agent and farmer in Norfolk, Virginia.

On June 23, 1874, House Resolution 3086, an "act to remove the political disabilities of George E. Pickett of Virginia", was passed by the U.S. Congress. Pickett was granted a full pardon, about a year before his death.

Pickett lamented his men, lost in great number at Gettysburg. Late in his life, Colonel John S. Mosby, who had served under General J. E. B. Stuart, was present when Lee and Pickett met briefly after the war. He claimed their interaction was cold and reserved. Others present at the meeting disputed this, stating Lee only acted in his usual reserved and gentlemanly fashion. Pickett, Mosby said, complained bitterly to him after this meeting that "That man destroyed my division." Mosby allegedly replied, "Yes, but he made you immortal." Most historians find the encounter as Mosby interpreted it unlikely. Asked by reporters why Pickett's Charge failed, Pickett frequently replied, "I've always thought the Yankees had something to do with it."

George E. Pickett died in Norfolk, Virginia, on July 30, 1875. The cause of death was a liver abscess, although whether it was alcohol-related, amoebic or bacterial is not clear. He was initially interred in Cedar Grove Cemetery in Norfolk. His remains were disinterred on October 23, and he was buried in Hollywood Cemetery in Richmond, Virginia, on October 24, 1875. More than 40,000 people lined the funeral route, while another 5,000 marched in the funeral procession. A memorial to Pickett was erected over his grave site and dedicated on October 5, 1888. The memorial was not, however, placed directly above Pickett's burial site, and the exact location of his remains is not clear.

LaSalle Corbell Pickett died on March 22, 1931, having outlived her husband by more than 55 years. Initially, Hollywood Cemetery declined to allow her to be buried next to her husband. Pickett's grandson, Lieutenant George E. Pickett III, threatened to have his grandfather disinterred and moved to Arlington National Cemetery, where both grandparents could be buried side by side. Hollywood Cemetery quickly agreed to permit LaSalle's interment at Hollywood, but this did not immediately occur for reasons which are not clear, and LaSalle was cremated and buried at Abbey Mausoleum in Arlington County, Virginia. Originally a mausoleum for the wealthy, it went bankrupt in 1968. The structure fell into disrepair, and it was vandalized many times and several graves desecrated. In early 1998, the Military Order of the Stars and Bars and United Daughters of the Confederacy worked together to pay for LaSalle's disinterment and reburial in front of the George E. Pickett Memorial in Hollywood Cemetery. LaSalle Pickett was buried on March 21, 1998. She was the first woman interred in the Confederate military burial section.

== Legacy ==
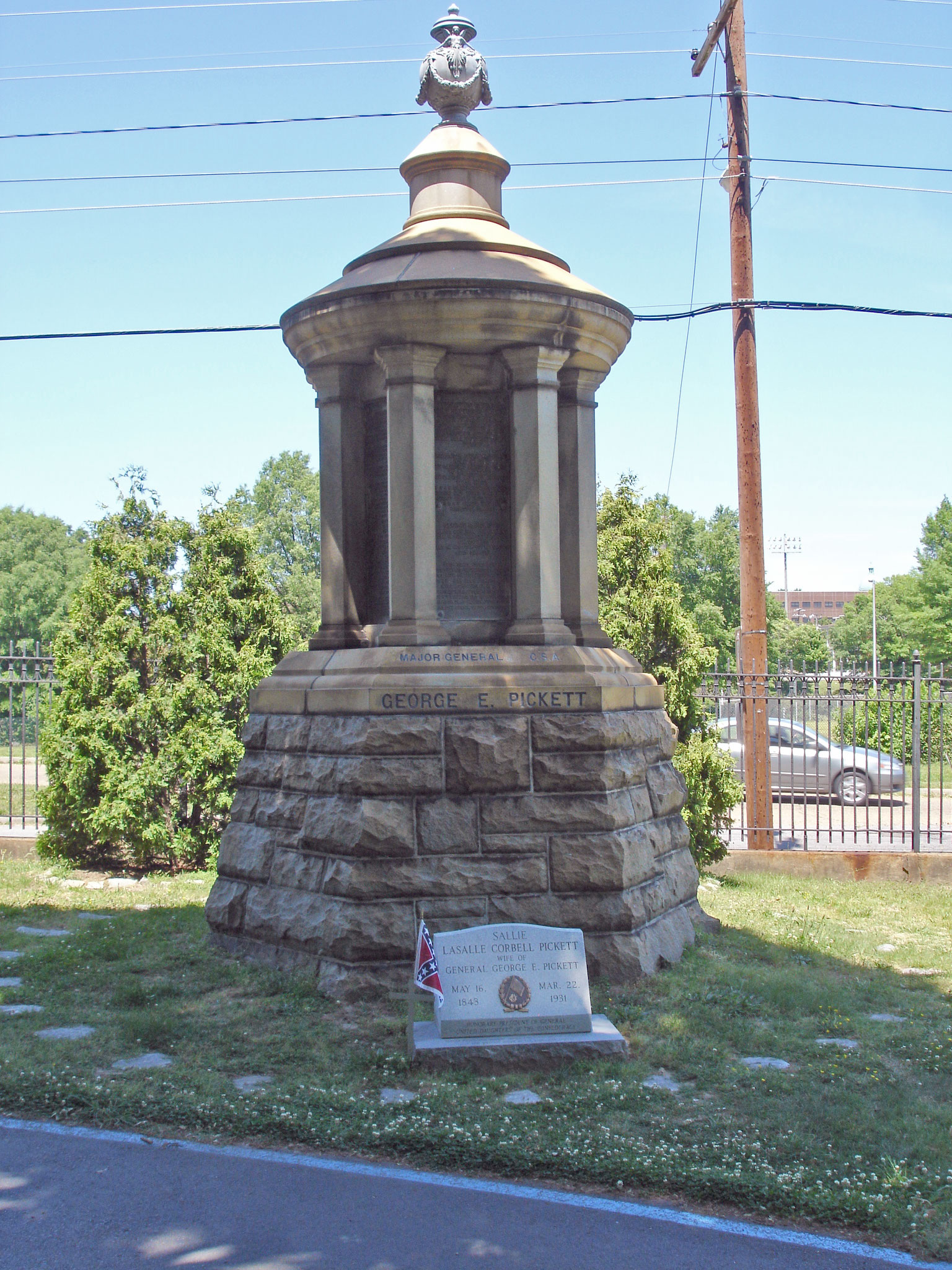
Pickett's grave site at Hollywood Cemetery

Decades after Pickett's death, his widow LaSalle (also known as "Sallie" and "Mother") became a well-known writer and speaker on "her Soldier", eventually leading to the creation of an idealized Pickett who was the perfect Southern gentleman and soldier. Much controversy attends LaSalle Pickett's lionizing of her husband. LaSalle was the author of Pickett and His Men, a history of her husband's military campaigns, which was published in 1899. She published two other books in her deceased husband's name, The Heart of a Soldier, As Revealed in the Intimate Letters of Gen'l George E. Pickett (published in 1913) and Soldier of the South: General Pickett's War Letters to His Wife (1928). While "Pickett and His Men" has remained a historically valuable document, the latter two writings have been described as "unreliable works that were fictionalized by Pickett's wife." As a result, General Pickett has become a figure partially obscured by "Lost Cause" mythology.

Pickett has been perceived in the American South as a tragic hero of sorts—a flamboyant officer who wanted to lead his troops into a glorious battle, but always missed the opportunity until the disastrous charge at Gettysburg. Historian John C. Waugh wrote of Pickett, "An excellent brigade commander, he never proved he could handle a division." He quotes George B. McClellan, the Union general, as saying: "Perhaps there is no doubt that he was the best infantry soldier developed on either side during the Civil War."

Pickett's grave is marked by a memorial in Hollywood Cemetery, which was placed there in 1888. A monument to Pickett also stands in the American Camp on San Juan Island, Washington, erected by the Washington University Historical Society on October 21, 1904.

Fort Pickett in Blackstone, Virginia, was named in his honor, before being renamed on March 24, 2023. It was completed in 1942 and served as an active U.S. Army training facility in World War II and is currently occupied by the Virginia National Guard.

== In popular culture ==
Actor Stephen Lang portrayed Pickett in the 1993 film Gettysburg. Billy Campbell portrayed him in the 2003 prequel Gods and Generals. In a 2003 interview, Lang commented that "for all of Pickett's flamboyance, there's something organically sad about him. Have you ever looked at any of the portraits of him? You can see it in his eyes, the sadness. He could be charming, but it was tinged with sadness."

Pickett also appeared in two episodes of the 1985 mini-series North and South, depicting him as a cadet at West Point, at which time he was a friend of George Hazard and Orry Main, the two main fictional characters of the series.

Pickett is referenced in Civilization V: Brave New World's Civil War scenario. Players can receive a promotion that gives a penalty for charging across open terrain.

== See also ==
- List of Confederate States Army generals
