= Abbey Mausoleum (Arlington County, Virginia) =

Defunct mausoleum in Arlington, Virginia

Coordinates: 38.8702°N 77.0741°W

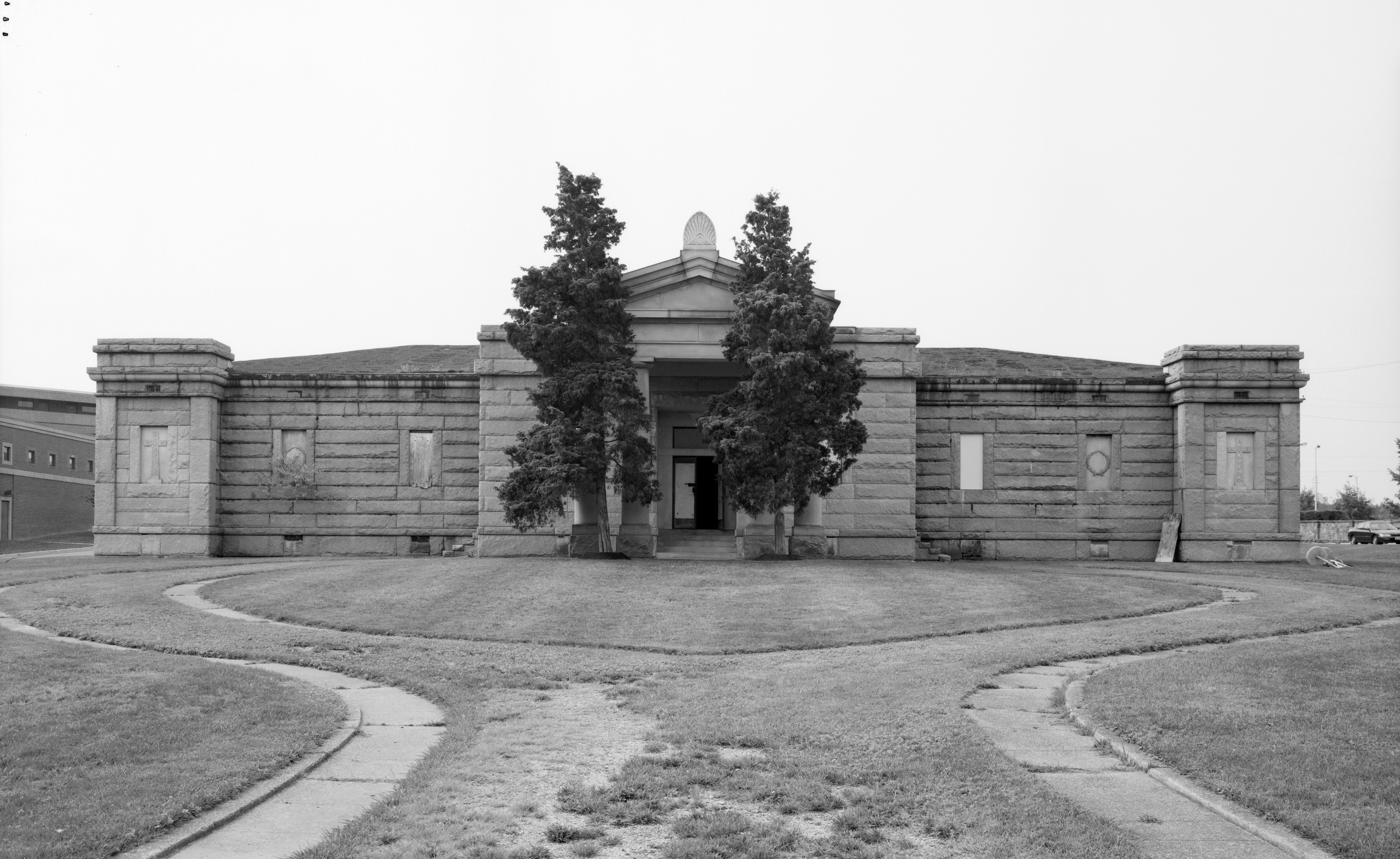
The front of Abbey Mausoleum in 1996.

Abbey Mausoleum was a mausoleum in Arlington County, Virginia, in the United States founded in 1924. One of the most luxurious burial places in the Washington, D.C., metropolitan area, many famous individuals, judges, and military leaders were buried there. The mausoleum encountered financial difficulties and declared bankruptcy in 1966. It suffered vandalism numerous times, and several graves were desecrated. Remains buried there were disinterred and reburied elsewhere, and it was demolished in February 2001. Several architectural features of the structure were salvaged. It was located just outside Arlington National Cemetery next to Henderson Hall.

== Founding of Abbey Mausoleum ==
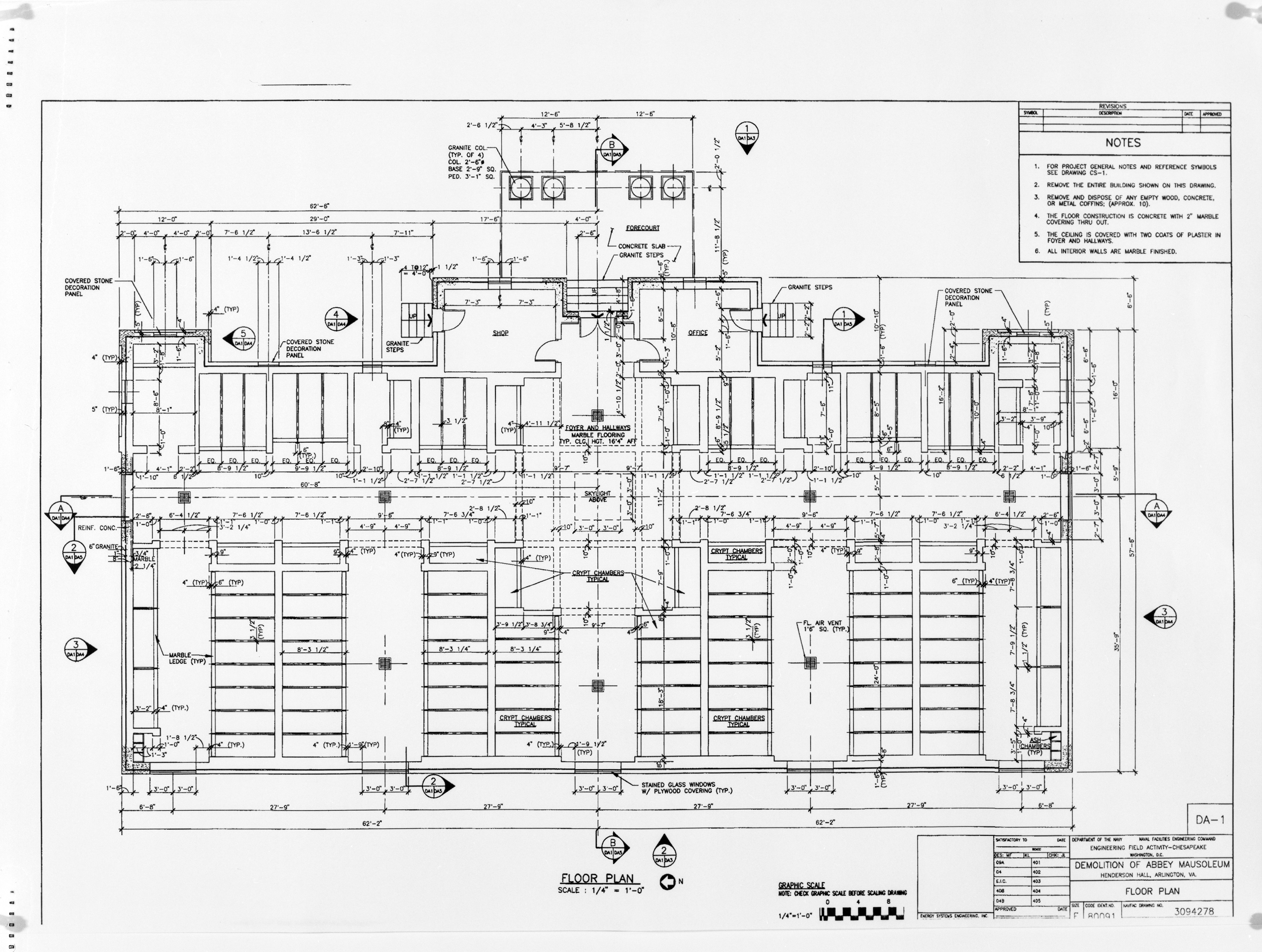
Floor plan of Abbey Mausoleum.

Abbey Mausoleum was built in 1924 by the U.S. Mausoleum Company. The land was owned by the Syphax family. Maria Custis Syphax, the matriarch of the family, was the mulatto daughter of George Washington Parke Custis, grandson of Martha Washington and founder of the Arlington Estate on the banks of the Potomac River (later the home of Robert E. Lee). The Syphax family sold the land to John Dormoyle in 1901, who then sold it to Frederick Rice in 1924. Rice subdivided the property into two lots, and sold one lot to the U.S. Mausoleum Company the same year. The 18,000 square feet (1,700 m^{2}) lot was rectangular in shape and located next to the Hobson Gate of Arlington National Cemetery.

The 50,193 square feet (4,663.1 m^{2}) structure was Neoclassical in style (although it has also been described as Romanesque Revival). The single-story structure was made of granite, with the interior and exterior clad in white Italian marble. The foundation was made of reinforced concrete, and the roof consisted of reinforced concrete ceiling, roof beams, and roof. The roof was externally clad in asphalt roofing materials. The entire structure was 19.5 feet (5.9 m) from grade to rooftop. The floor was a 6 inches (15 cm) marble base. Stained-glass windows by Tiffany Studios provided light. There were 654 crypts, stacked six high below 16.3-foot (5.0 m) high ceilings. Crypts included 60 niches for cremated remains. Interior light was provided by skylights.

Abbey Mausoleum contained two types of coffin vaults: casket vaults and couch vaults. (Note: A casket vault is where the casket goes in feet-first. A couch vault is where the casket is placed lengthwise to the corridor. The couch vault is considered a deluxe vault. Either type of vault may be a "true tandem" vault, where caskets may lie side-by-side. A less expensive type of vault is the "companion" vault, where two casket vaults are side-by-side.) Casket and couch vaults were made of concrete, and sometimes lined with paper. Once a vault was occupied, it would be sealed with concrete. A marble plate (or "shutter") was screwed into the wall to cover the vault. (Note: Companion vaults sometimes had a shutter that covered both vaults. In cases where a spouse remarried after death, three vaults might lie side-by-side, in which case the shutter covered all three vaults.) Cremation niches were also made of concrete, but rarely lined with paper and not sealed with concrete. Their sole seal was the marble shutter.

The mausoleum was constructed by Stone Mountain Granite Corporation of Atlanta, Georgia. It was dedicated on March 26, 1926, although it was completed in 1927.

U.S. Mausoleum encountered financial difficulties in 1927, and sold the building and grounds to the Stone Mountain Granite Corporation before dissolving. In 1928, a new corporation, Abbey Mausoleum Inc., was formed by local D.C. area businessmen, and it purchased the crypt and land from Stone Mountain Granite. Abbey Mausoleum Inc. then purchased in 1928 the second lot offered for sale by Rice, and invested additional funds to complete the finishing touches on the crypt.

The first interment was that of Lilla Jewel Kenney. The date of her interment is not entirely clear, but it could have been as early as February 25, 1925, or before March 26, 1925, or before the mausoleum's completion in 1927. Over the next three decades, Abbey Mausoleum interred 245 remains in crypts and 60 remains in cremation niches.

== Enclosure by Henderson Hall and bankruptcy ==
The United States Marine Corps headquarters moved to the Navy Annex Building adjacent to the south side of Arlington National Cemetery in November 1941. A Headquarters and Service Company was organized on March 1, 1942, and a Women Marine Company organized as part of the Headquarters unit on April 1, 1943. To house both companies, the Marine Corps began acquiring, through purchase, easement, eminent domain, and other means, property to the west and northwest of the Navy Annex Building. This included all the land around Abbey Mausoleum. Henderson Hall was built on this property in September 1943 to house both companies. All told, 23 acres (93,000 m^{2}) were acquired, and athletic fields, a bowling alley, chapel, firing range, gas station, gym, hobby shop, officers' and enlisted men's clubs, post exchange, post office, radio station, supply depot, and swimming pool were all built on the site. Land acquisition ended in 1952, and on February 1, 1954, the state of Virginia executed a document ceding political jurisdiction over the land to the U.S. federal government.

In 1943, the federal government purchased most of the second lot from Abbey Mausoleum Inc., leaving the mausoleum with just 0.5 acres (2,000 m^{2}) of land, (another source says 0.7 acres (2,800 m^{2}) of land)

Security concerns during World War II led the Marine Corps to close Abbey Mausoleum to the public. The federal government also barred new interments, and the sale of empty crypts and niches ended. It is unclear if Abbey Mausoleum Inc.'s financial troubles were caused by the land sale or merely exacerbated by it, but the mausoleum began to be neglected about this time. Legislation was introduced in Congress in 1945 to give the United States Department of War $550,000 to acquire the crypt and its land, but the bill was not enacted. The corporation's directors abandoned the company and its assets on January 1, 1957. The tax-exempt corporation's remaining $27,000 were placed into a trust fund, but it was rapidly depleted.

Abbey Mausoleum Inc. went bankrupt in 1966. Frank B. Tavenner, an attorney for crypt buyers, was named bankruptcy trustee by the Circuit Court of Arlington County. A $17,000 trust was established to provide maintenance, but that fund also ran out. From the mid-1960s to mid-1980s, a number of individuals buried at Abbey Mausoleum were disinterred at private expense and reburied elsewhere.

== Vandalism, disinterments and demolition ==
It is unclear when burials at the mausoleum ended. At least one source says 1942 and another "during World War II", but others say 1964 and 1974. Many crypts had been purchased, but not all were in use. Some individuals had been disinterred and reburied elsewhere, while 105 crypts had been purchased but never used. In 1984, Tavenner suspected that many owners of unused crypts had been buried elsewhere due to the federal government's ban on new burials at Abbey Mausoleum.

By 1976, the land around the mausoleum was so heavily covered with tall grass and dense brush that the mausoleum was partially obscured. Arlington County Police began patrolling the site in the late 1970s after several break-ins. But their patrols were infrequent and irregular, because police had to gain permission to access the Marine base. In 1984, Marine Corps guards began patrolling and maintaining the exterior grounds to reduce vandalism.

=== Vandalism ===
In the early 1970s, Abbey Mausoleum was routinely vandalized. Its stained glass windows were boarded up for protection. Between 1979 and 1994, Abbey Mausoleum was broken into and vandalized at least six times. According to Arlington County police, vandals usually entered the building by prying open windows leading to the crawl space below the crypt, then entering the tomb through an air vent grating in the floor.

In the fall of 1976, vandals opened and desecrated 12 coffins and 10 urns. One crypt was completely opened and the coffin removed. The vandals opened the coffin, and placed a copy of Circus (a heavy metal music magazine) on the chest of the skeleton. The vandals also broke into a funeral niche, poured the human ashes on the floor, and drew a smiley face in them.

One of the worst cases occurred in 1979, in which 45 crypts were broken into, coffins removed, and the remains decapitated. The vandals then stuck the skulls on broomsticks and left them upright.

In another case in the late 1980s, vandals removed urns from niches and poured the ashes onto the floor, mixing their contents and writing in the ashes. In 1994, police discovered bloody handprints, candles, dead cats, pentagrams, and other signs of occult worship. Two crypts were opened, the coffins placed on the floor, and the remains exposed. Police had no leads, as the vandalism appeared to be several years old.

=== Closure and demolition ===
Tavenner attempted to sell Abbey Mausoleum several times. The Marine Corps wanted to buy the land, but Congress declined to appropriate the funds. A private cemetery agreed to take over operation of the site, but only if the mausoleum and land were donated to it. Arlington National Cemetery officials declined to purchase it because it was outside the cemetery's boundaries.

The Marine Corps secured a $1.9 million appropriation from Congress to acquire Abbey Mausoleum in 1995. In November of that year, the United States Army Corps of Engineers began administering the mausoleum. A plan for identifying and contacting descendants, providing for private disinterment and reburial, and for relocating all remaining graves was then devised.

A U.S. federal court approved the burial relocation plan in December 2000. By this time, only 283 people were still interred at the mausoleum, according to the Corps of Engineers. The Corps located 109 relatives of the dead, but only 10 made their own arrangements for disinterment and reburial. The Corps moved the remaining bodies and ashes to a mausoleum at National Memorial Park, a cemetery in Idylwood near Falls Church, Virginia. Although still structurally sound, demolition of the structure occurred on February 5, 2001.

== Artistic salvage ==
The United States Navy and the Arlington County Planning Department signed an agreement prior to Abbey Mausoleum's demolition to salvage many of the structure's components for historic preservation. Arlington County was granted explicit ownership of the stained glass windows at the site, as well as any interior or exterior architectural elements it wished. The demolition contractor was given salvage rights to all other materials.

Upon examination by stained glass experts, the windows were revealed to have been designed and crafted by Louis Comfort Tiffany, the son of the founder of Tiffany & Co. Twelve of the windows consisted of geometric and floral patterns mingled with religious symbols. The thirteenth and largest window depicted Jesus with his hand raised in benediction. Experts determined that the windows were dedicated to E. St. Clair Thompson, a wealthy Freemason interred at Abbey Mausoleum in 1933. The windows were probably commissioned by the Thompson family. Many of the windows were damaged by vandalism, and most had suffered cracks, fading, and missing pieces due to neglect and age.

The windows were sent to Shenandoah Stained Glass, an art glass restoration company, for repair. Workers spent three months hand-cleaning each piece of glass and fitting each window chosen for preservation into a new aluminum frame. According to stained glass restorer Mark Russel, the windows suffered significant fading damage due to sunlight and lack of care. Shenandoah workers discovered that the windows were made of common opal glass and high-quality "cathedral glass" from the Kokomo Opalescent Glass Works in Kokomo, Indiana. To repair the windows, Shenandoah Stained Glass found identically-colored opal or Kokomo-produced glass and glazed it to replace broken pieces. The large religious-themed window (which was 10 by 10 feet (3.0 by 3.0 m) square) proved too expensive to restore, and five others were too heavily damaged to repair. These windows were partially cannibalized to restore the others. Fragments of glass were also collected from the floor of the mausoleum, and used to reconstruct the remaining windows. Epoxy was used to fill in small cracks and chips.

Three of the restored windows were installed at the Arlington County Arts Center at 3550 Wilson Boulevard. Four other restored windows were installed at Arlington County's Westover Library at 1644 North McKinley Road. Abbey Mausoleum's skylight was also restored, and is installed (as a working skylight) at the Fairlington Community Center at 3308 South Stafford Street in Arlington County.

An acroterion was also salvaged from the exterior of Abbey Mausoleum. This decorative device was installed on the sidewalk in front of the Westover Library. Three bas-reliefs were also recovered from the mausoleum. Their disposition is not known.

== Famous interments ==
Abbey Mausoleum was considered one of the most luxurious and richly appointed mausoleums in the Washington, D.C., metropolitan area. Many rich and famous individuals chose to be interred there between 1927 and 1942. Among the notable individuals buried there were:

- Frederick A. Britten, Representative from Illinois — reinterred at Fort Lincoln Cemetery in Brentwood, Maryland.
- Philip P. Campbell, Representative from Kansas — reinterred at National Memorial Park.
- Charles F. Curry, Representative from California — reinterred at National Memorial Park.
- Elizabeth Bell Bates da Gama, wife of Domicio da Gama, former Brazilian ambassador to the United States — reinterred at National Memorial Park.
- George Eddy Downey, judge, United States Court of Claims — reinterred at National Memorial Park.
- Andrew Jackson Houston, Senator from Texas — reinterred at Texas State Cemetery.
- J. Hamilton Lewis, Senator from Illinois — reinterred at Fort Lincoln Cemetery in Brentwood, Maryland.
- Oscar Raymond Luhring, judge, U.S. District Court for the District of Columbia — reinterred at National Memorial Park.
- Porter J. McCumber, Senator from North Dakota — reinterred at Columbia Gardens Cemetery in Arlington, Virginia.
- Elwood Mead, architect of Hoover Dam — reinterred at National Memorial Park.
- LaSalle Corbell Pickett, wife of Major General George Pickett, CSA, who led Pickett's Charge during the Battle of Gettysburg in the American Civil War — reinterred at Hollywood Cemetery in Richmond, Virginia.
- George Sutherland, Associate Justice of the U.S. Supreme Court (1922–1938) — reinterred in 1958 at Cedar Hill Cemetery near Suitland, Maryland.
- George H. Terrett, Colonel, CSA — reinterred at National Memorial Park.

== Bibliography ==
- Allardice, Bruce S. Confederate Colonels: A Biographical Register. Columbia, Mo.: University of Missouri Press, 2008.
- Atkinson, David N. Leaving the Bench: Supreme Court Justices at the End. Lawrence, Kan.: University Press of Kansas, 1999.
- Committee on Military Affairs. Hearings on H.R. 4587, A Bill to Provide for the Appointment of Additional Commissioned Officers in the Regular Army, and for Other Purposes, Nov 6, 1945. U.S. House of Representatives. 79th Cong., 1st sess. Washington, D.C.: Government Printing Office, 1946.
- Guttery, Ben R. Representing Texas: A Comprehensive History of U.S. and Confederate Senators and Representatives From Texas. Seattle: Booksurge, 2008.
- Johnston, Marguerite. Houston, the Unknown City, 1836–1946. College Station, Tex.: Texas A&M University Press, 1991.
- Mitchell, Mary H. Hollywood Cemetery: The History of a Southern Shrine. Richmond: Library of Virginia, 1999.
- Waskey, A.J.L. "Sutherland, George." In The Encyclopedia of the Supreme Court. David Shultz, ed. New York: Facts on File, 2005.
