= Wakefield, Virginia =

- Town
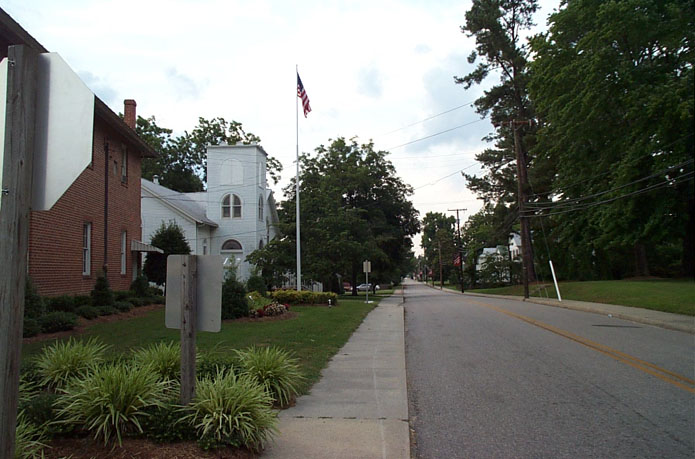
- West Church Street at Main Street in Wakefield

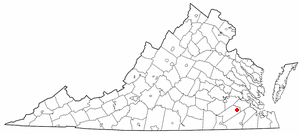
- Location of Wakefield, Virginia
- Coordinates: 36°58′13″N 76°59′18″W
- Country: United States
- State: Virginia
- County: Sussex

Government
  - Mayor: Brian Laine

Area
  - Total: 1.29 sq mi (3.33 km^{2})
  - Land: 1.24 sq mi (3.22 km^{2})
  - Water: 0.039 sq mi (0.10 km^{2})
- Elevation: 98 ft (30 m)

Population (2020)
  - Total: 759
  - Density: 610/sq mi (236/km^{2})
- Time zone: UTC−5 (Eastern (EST))
  - Summer (DST): UTC−4 (EDT)
- ZIP code: 23888
- Area codes: 757, 948
- FIPS code: 51-82384
- GNIS feature ID: 1496365
- Website: https://wakefieldva.org/

Wakefield is an incorporated town in Sussex County, Virginia, United States. Per the 2020 census, the population was 729.

Wakefield is widely known for the Virginia Diner, the Airfield Conference and 4-H Educational Center, and the National Weather Service Weather Forecast Office for Eastern Virginia, Southeastern Maryland and Northeastern North Carolina, which issues weather alerts for the region including the cities of Elizabeth City, Norfolk, Virginia Beach, Portsmouth, Chesapeake, Newport News, Hampton, Richmond, Petersburg, Hopewell, Salisbury and Ocean City MD, though the latter two are actually located outside the town limits.

Wakefield also hosts the Virginia Shad Planking.

== Geography ==
Wakefield is located at 36°58′13″N 76°59′18″W (36.970219, −76.988461).

According to the United States Census Bureau, the town has a total area of 1.3 square miles (3.3 km^{2}), of which 1.2 square miles (3.2 km^{2}) is land and 0.04 square mile (0.1 km^{2}) (3.10%) is water.

=== Climate ===
Climate data for Wakefield 1 NW, Virginia (1991–2020 normals, extremes 1982–present)
| Month | Jan | Feb | Mar | Apr | May | Jun | Jul | Aug | Sep | Oct | Nov | Dec | Year |
|---|---|---|---|---|---|---|---|---|---|---|---|---|---|
| Record high °F (°C) | 82 (28) | 82 (28) | 89 (32) | 96 (36) | 97 (36) | 102 (39) | 105 (41) | 104 (40) | 105 (41) | 99 (37) | 84 (29) | 81 (27) | 105 (41) |
| Mean daily maximum °F (°C) | 49.8 (9.9) | 53.0 (11.7) | 61.1 (16.2) | 71.4 (21.9) | 78.6 (25.9) | 85.8 (29.9) | 89.7 (32.1) | 87.7 (30.9) | 81.8 (27.7) | 72.0 (22.2) | 62.0 (16.7) | 53.1 (11.7) | 70.5 (21.4) |
| Daily mean °F (°C) | 39.0 (3.9) | 41.5 (5.3) | 48.4 (9.1) | 58.3 (14.6) | 66.6 (19.2) | 74.5 (23.6) | 78.8 (26.0) | 77.0 (25.0) | 71.0 (21.7) | 60.0 (15.6) | 49.8 (9.9) | 42.3 (5.7) | 58.9 (14.9) |
| Mean daily minimum °F (°C) | 28.2 (−2.1) | 30.1 (−1.1) | 35.8 (2.1) | 45.2 (7.3) | 54.7 (12.6) | 63.3 (17.4) | 68.0 (20.0) | 66.3 (19.1) | 60.2 (15.7) | 48.0 (8.9) | 37.6 (3.1) | 31.4 (−0.3) | 47.4 (8.6) |
| Record low °F (°C) | −14 (−26) | −4 (−20) | 12 (−11) | 22 (−6) | 30 (−1) | 43 (6) | 49 (9) | 46 (8) | 36 (2) | 27 (−3) | 16 (−9) | 2 (−17) | −14 (−26) |
| Average precipitation inches (mm) | 3.83 (97) | 2.80 (71) | 4.22 (107) | 3.76 (96) | 4.15 (105) | 4.77 (121) | 5.47 (139) | 5.50 (140) | 6.05 (154) | 3.95 (100) | 3.17 (81) | 3.73 (95) | 51.40 (1,306) |
| Average snowfall inches (cm) | 3.5 (8.9) | 1.4 (3.6) | 0.4 (1.0) | 0.0 (0.0) | 0.0 (0.0) | 0.0 (0.0) | 0.0 (0.0) | 0.0 (0.0) | 0.0 (0.0) | 0.0 (0.0) | 0.0 (0.0) | 1.1 (2.8) | 6.4 (16) |
| Average precipitation days (≥ 0.01 in) | 10.3 | 9.3 | 11.3 | 10.2 | 11.0 | 10.6 | 11.2 | 10.4 | 9.4 | 8.3 | 8.2 | 10.9 | 121.1 |
| Average snowy days (≥ 0.1 in) | 1.4 | 1.0 | 0.6 | 0.1 | 0.0 | 0.0 | 0.0 | 0.0 | 0.0 | 0.0 | 0.1 | 0.6 | 3.8 |
Source: NOAA

== History ==
Wakefield appears on the Fry-Jefferson map of Virginia first published in 1752.

== Demographics ==
Historical population
| Census | Pop. | Note | %± |
|---|---|---|---|
| 1910 | 570 | | — |
| 1920 | 784 | | 37.5% |
| 1930 | 881 | | 12.4% |
| 1940 | 687 | | −22.0% |
| 1950 | 949 | | 38.1% |
| 1960 | 1,015 | | 7.0% |
| 1970 | 942 | | −7.2% |
| 1980 | 1,355 | | 43.8% |
| 1990 | 1,070 | | −21.0% |
| 2000 | 1,038 | | −3.0% |
| 2010 | 927 | | −10.7% |
| 2020 | 759 | | −18.1% |
U.S. Decennial Census; 2010 2020

=== Racial and ethnic composition ===
Wakefield town, Virginia – Racial and ethnic composition Note: the US Census treats Hispanic/Latino as an ethnic category. This table excludes Latinos from the racial categories and assigns them to a separate category. Hispanics/Latinos may be of any race.
| Race / Ethnicity (NH = Non-Hispanic) | Pop 2000 | Pop 2010 | Pop 2020 | % 2000 | % 2010 | % 2020 |
|---|---|---|---|---|---|---|
| White alone (NH) | 491 | 427 | 347 | 47.30% | 46.06% | 45.72% |
| Black or African American alone (NH) | 530 | 469 | 345 | 51.06% | 50.59% | 45.45% |
| Native American or Alaska Native alone (NH) | 2 | 3 | 0 | 0.19% | 0.32% | 0.00% |
| Asian alone (NH) | 0 | 14 | 1 | 0.00% | 1.51% | 0.13% |
| Native Hawaiian or Pacific Islander alone (NH) | 0 | 0 | 0 | 0.00% | 0.00% | 0.00% |
| Other race alone (NH) | 0 | 0 | 8 | 0.00% | 0.00% | 1.05% |
| Mixed race or Multiracial (NH) | 11 | 6 | 40 | 1.06% | 0.65% | 5.27% |
| Hispanic or Latino (any race) | 4 | 8 | 18 | 0.39% | 0.86% | 2.37% |
| Total | 1,038 | 927 | 759 | 100.00% | 100.00% | 100.00% |

=== 2010 Census ===
As of the 2010 United States census, there were 927 people living in the city. The racial makeup of the town was 50.6% Black, 46.1% White, 0.3% Native American, 1.5% Asian and 0.6% from two or more races. 0.9% were Hispanic or Latino of any race.

As of the census of 2000, there were 1,038 people, 423 households, and 285 families living in the town. The population density was 833.2 people per square mile (320.6/km^{2}). There were 485 housing units at an average density of 389.3 per square mile (149.8/km^{2}). The racial makeup of the town was 47.50% White, 51.25% African American, 0.19% Native American, and 1.06% from two or more races. Hispanic or Latino of any race were 0.39% of the population.

There were 423 households, out of which 27.2% had children under the age of 18 living with them, 48.5% were married couples living together, 16.3% had a female householder with no husband present, and 32.6% were non-families. 30.0% of all households were made up of individuals, and 17.5% had someone living alone who was 65 years of age or older. The average household size was 2.45 and the average family size was 3.05.

In the town, the population was spread out, with 24.9% under the age of 18, 6.2% from 18 to 24, 26.0% from 25 to 44, 24.6% from 45 to 64, and 18.4% who were 65 years of age or older. The median age was 40 years. For every 100 females, there were 86.7 males. For every 100 females aged 18 and over, there were 79.3 males.

The median income for a household in the town was $28,500, and the median income for a family was $34,539. Males had a median income of $26,429 versus $21,595 for females. The per capita income for the town was $15,290. About 9.9% of families and 13.4% of the population were below the poverty line, including 26.1% of those under age 18 and 17.3% of those age 65 or over.
