= Corbin Harney =

Native American anti-nuclear activist

- Born: March 24, 1920; Bruneau, Idaho
- Died: July 10, 2007 (aged 87) near Petaluma, California
- Citizenship: Shoshone-Paiute Tribes of the Duck Valley Reservation
- Known for: activist for environmental justice

Corbin Harney (March 24, 1920 – July 10, 2007) was an elder and spiritual leader of the Newe (Western Shoshone) people. Harney reportedly inspired the creation in 1994 of the Shundahai Network, which works for environmental justice and nuclear disarmament. The Shundahai Network plays a key role in organizing non-violent civil disobedience aimed at bringing about the closure of the Nevada Test Site, used for testing nuclear weapons, which is located on Western Shoshone land.

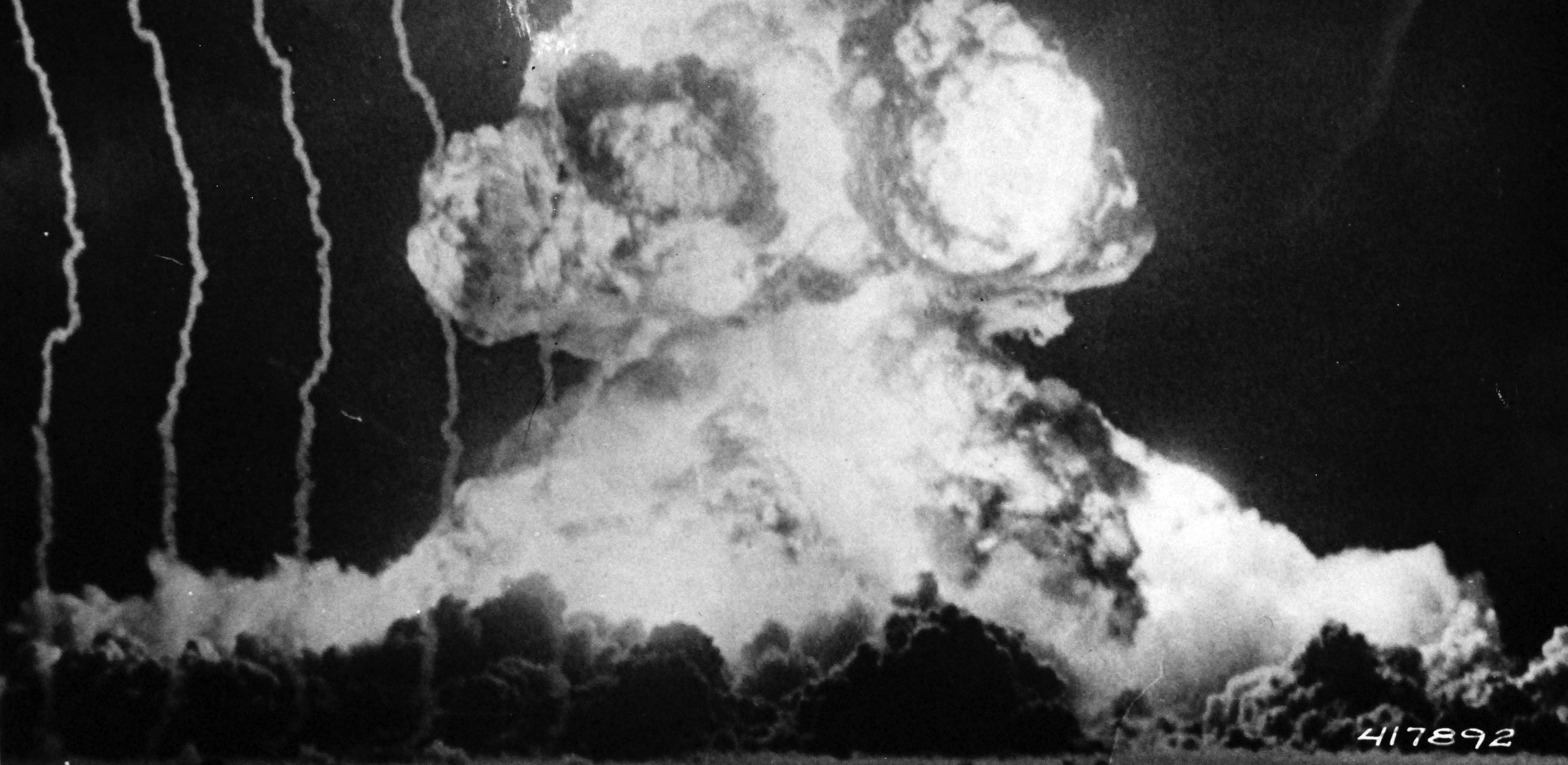
1953 Atom bomb test at Yucca Flats Nevada

== Early life ==
Harney's formal education ended when he ran away from Indian boarding school at the age of nine. He felt that his schoolmates were mistreated by their teachers. Beginning in 1957, he worked with medicine women of Battle Mountain, Nevada, running the Sundance Ceremony and sweat lodges as well as helping sick people. As a medicine man, he also worked steadily to preserve and protect the sacred sites and burial grounds of his people. He was raised to view all life as sacred.

== Work and activism ==
Harney devoted his life to working to save the land on which his people have survived for thousands of years. The United States Government has exploded more than 1,000 nuclear weapons at the Nevada Test Site, which is located on Western Shoshone land from the Treaty of Ruby Valley (1863).

Harney spent most of his time traveling around the world spreading a message about the dangers of nuclear energy and nuclear weapons.

In 1989, Harney visited the former Soviet hydrogen bomb testing site in Semipalatinsk, Kazakhstan. He reported that he saw victims of the radiation in hospitals that he visited, people who lived close to the Russian nuclear test site. Harney talked about the contamination of water in his writings and speeches. He said:" I didn't really understand what I was told until I went to Kazakhstan in Russia. Kazakhstan is where Russia tested hydrogen bombs for many years. Over there I saw water that looks like clean water, but people can't drink it because it is contaminated with radiation ... [t]he nature put all the living things here for us to take care of, not to destroy them."

In 1994 he founded the Shundahai Network ("shundahai" translates to "peace and harmony with all creation") where he remained as board chair until his death. In 2003 received the International Nuclear Free Future Solutions award.

Harney's experiences with victims of the nuclear weapons testing, particularly the "Downwinders" of the Western United States, gave credibility to his words. Downwinders refers to the US citizens that were downwind from the atomic bomb tests in Nevada. Harney was a keynote speaker at the Atomic and Hydrogen Bomb Conference in 2001, in Nagasaki, Japan, where he was able to speak with still-recovering survivors of the testing (in the Marshall Islands, and other South Pacific atolls) or use (Hiroshima and Nagasaki) of nuclear weapons.

He was also the founder and director of Poo Ha Bah, a traditional healing center in Tecopa, California.

"I have established Poo-Ha-Bah for all the people. Poo-Ha-Bah in my language is a very important word--it's talking about Doctor Water. My people have always traveled for many miles to get into different kinds of healing waters."

Trained from childhood in the traditional Newe ways of medicine and spirituality (the two are not viewed separately), Harney noted the extinction of medicinal plants due to the toxins of mining, and the disappearance of many birds and other animals that once roamed the Newe homelands.

Harney completed arrangements for the publication of his second book, "The Nature Way", shortly before his death. In this book he shares the traditional knowledge of his people, the Newe.

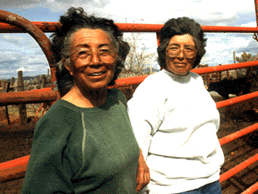
Carrie (r.) and Mary Dann

Together with Harney in the defense of Western Shoshone lands were the sisters Mary Dann and Carrie Dann who contested the government's use of their land in a case that went to the US Supreme Court.

Harney died of cancer which had metastasized into his bones (Non-Hodgkin's lymphoma).

== Film ==
Broken Treaty at Battle Mountain, released in 1975, Joel Freedman a MacArthur Foundation Film selection narrated by Robert Redford 60 minutes. This film documents The Western Shoshone of Nevadas fight to preserve 24,000 acres to save their pinon trees needed for food and traditional practices.

Newe Segobia is not for sale. The Struggle for Western Shoshone Land 1993 documentary by Jesse Drew

To Protect Mother Earth,1989. Joel Freedman documentary won the CINE Golden Eagle award as well as a best short film award at the 1990 Chicago film festival.

American Outrage (2008) produced by Gage films; Mary and Carrie Dann, sisters, are two women of the Western Shoshone tribe in Nevada who challenged the US government for land rights and the case goes to the US Supreme Court.

== Books ==
Harney, Corbin The Nature Way 2009 University of Nevada Press, Reno ISBN 9780874178043

Harney, Corbin The way it is: one water-one air-one mother earth 1995 Blue Dolphin Pub. Nevada City CA ISBN 0931892805

Fradkin, Philip. Fallout an American Nuclear Tragedy 1989 Johnson Books, Colorado ISBN 978-1555663315
