= Spring Valley (Nevada) =

Spring Valley may refer to two locations in the U.S. state of Nevada:

- Spring Valley, Nevada, a town in Clark County
- Spring Valley (White Pine County, Nevada), a basic in northeastern Nevada
  - Spring Valley Wind Farm, built in the valley in 2012
