= Mae Timbimboo Parry =

Native American storyteller (1919–2007

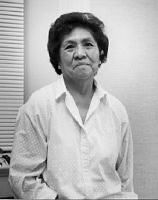
- Born: May 15, 1919; Washakie, Utah, U.S.
- Died: March 20, 2007 (aged 87); Clearfield, Utah, U.S.
- Citizenship: Northwestern Shoshone
- Occupations: Tribal Historian, Storyteller, Activist
- Known for: Advocating for public awareness of the Bear River Massacre

Mae Timbimboo Parry (May 15, 1919 – March 20, 2007) was a storyteller for the Northwestern Band of the Shoshone Nation of Utah, activist, and member of the Church of Jesus Christ of Latter-Day Saints. She is known for her recounting of the Bear River Massacre and for her work with the Shoshone Nation and the state of Utah, as well as for lobbying for legislation that would protect the culture and land-rights of Native Americans. For her work, Parry has received multiple awards.

== Early life ==
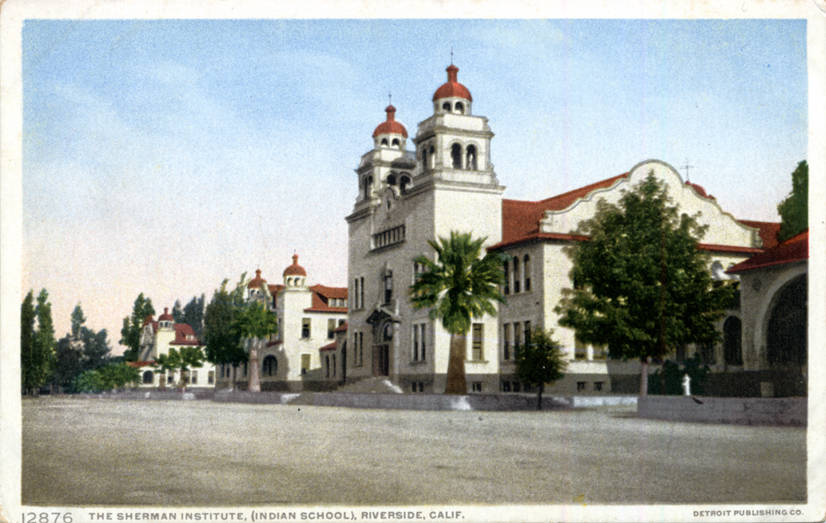
Sherman Institute in Riverside, California. Indian Boarding School where Mae Timbimboo Parry and her sisters attended for three years.

Mae Timbimboo Parry was born on May 15, 1919, in Washakie, Utah, to her parents Moroni and Amy Hewchoo Timbimboo. Although not an Indian Reservation, at the time of her birth and growing up years, Washakie was home to a significant population of Northwestern Shoshone. Even though the Northwestern Band of the Shoshone believed this land to be theirs, the title to the land belonged to the Church of Jesus Christ of Latter-Day Saints and would remain that way for decades. She grew up as a middle child in a family of six girls and three boys, though only six of the children would survive past infancy. When she was eight years old, Mae was enrolled with her two older sisters for three years at Sherman Institute, an Indian Boarding School in Riverside, California. She would later remark that she had a positive experience at the boarding school and would even excel making the honor roll. While at the boarding school, she was even able to travel home occasionally. When Parry returned to Washakie, she would attend the local school until the eighth grade when she began high school in Garland, Utah at Bear River High School. When she finished her time there, she was the first Native American to graduate from that school. She would later attend the LDS Business College in Salt Lake City, Utah.

== Family life ==
During her time at LDS Business College in 1938, Mae married her childhood friend, Grant Parry, after the fashion of members of the Church of Jesus Christ of Latter-Day Saints in the Salt Lake Temple and remained together for 68 years until her death. Together, the couple would raise five children: two boys and three girls. At the time of her death, she would be a grandmother to sixteen, a great-grandmother to twenty-seven, and even have a great-great-granddaughter. One grandson, Darren Parry, would go on to become the Chairman of the Northwestern Band of the Shoshone Nation and would continue his grandmother's advocacy for greater Native American historical awareness. Darren Parry features his grandmother in his book, The Bear River Massacre: A Shoshone History. He attended an unveiling of a painting from Chief Sagwich's perspective that hangs in the Hutchings Museum in Lehi, Utah. In her later years, she would develop Parkinson's disease; she died in Clearfield, Utah at the age of 87.

== Northwestern Shoshone historian ==
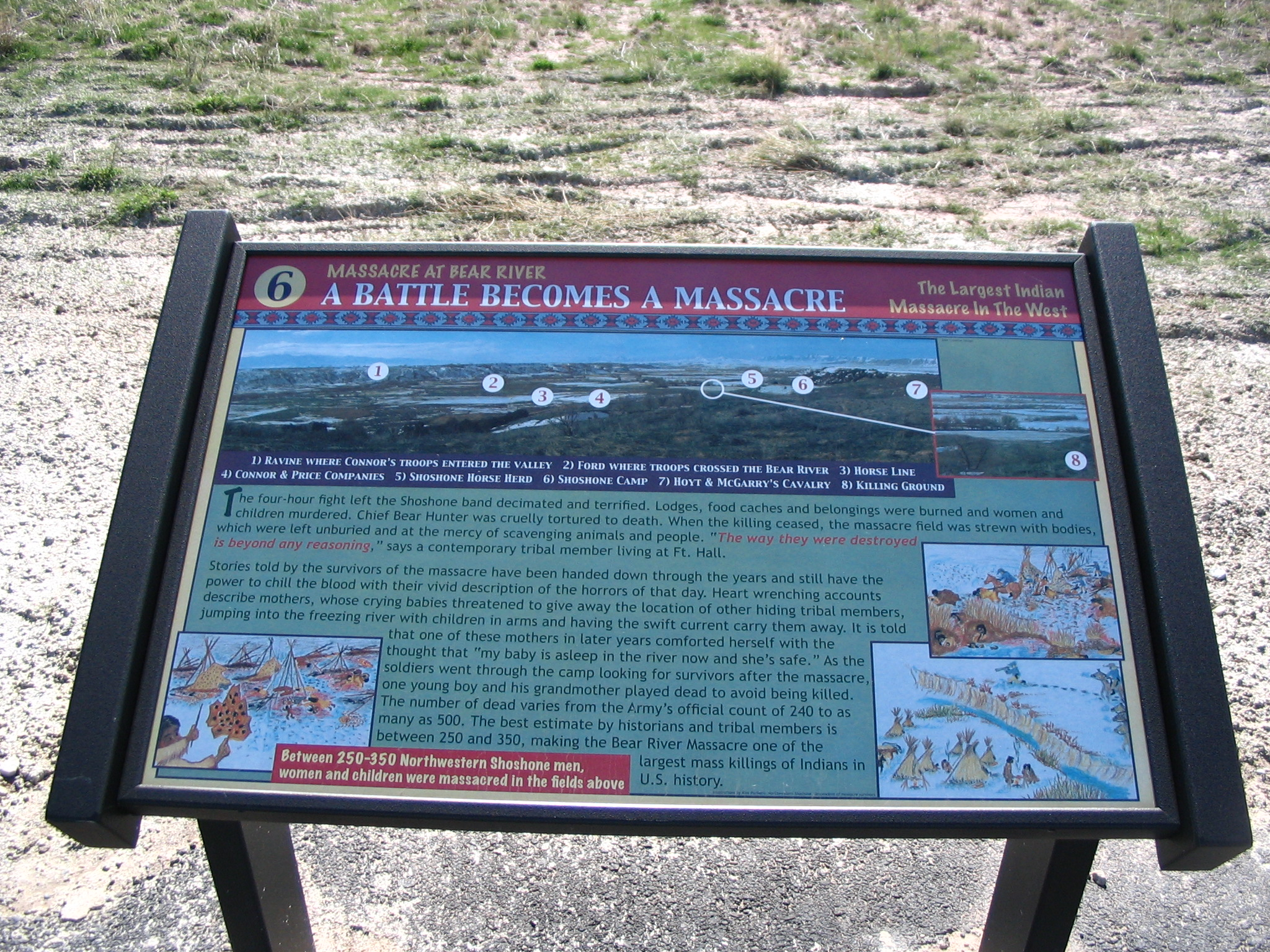
Mae Parry worked hard to change public memory of the massacre of the Northwestern Band of the Shoshone at Bear River by the command of Colonel Patrick Connor.

While in high school, Parry began a process of recording her people's history in writing, an endeavor that had never been done by her people before and a process that has preserved her people's history for generations to come. She recorded her people's history as she had heard it told to her through the oral histories from her tribe. Mae Parry would spend much of the rest of her life dedicated to recording her people's history and making it known to the world. One of her primary aims as a historian was to change the name of "The Battle of Bear River" to "The Bear River Massacre." In 1976, Parry published an article titled "Massacre at Boa Ogoi" which vividly described the massacre that happened to the Northwestern Band of the Shoshone by the hands of US soldiers on January 29, 1863, from the oral histories that survived among her people. This was a significant event in the history of the Northwestern Shoshone that changed the course of their history and affected how the United States army would interact with Native Americans in the future. On this day, Colonel Patrick Connor would lead a surprise attack on an essentially defenseless band of Shoshone men, women, and children resulting in hundreds of casualties among the Northwestern Shoshone greatly reducing their population and resulted in only a handful of casualties among the US soldiers. This event had previously only been publicly understood from the perspectives of the soldiers and settlers involved with the event; however, through Parry's advocacy, the name of the event was changed thereby influencing public perception as well. She told stories that her grandfather, Chief Sagwich, had witnessed at the battle. The Chief gave his account of picking up his living brand new infant daughter from his dead wife's arms and having the infant placed in a cradle board. The Shoshone hung the cradle board in a nearby tree. It saved the girl's life. She was named by her white family, Jane Hull. The history also included the accounts of Shoshone mothers hiding beneath the riverbank and letting their children float down the river so that their cries would not attract the attention of the United States soldiers. Although her work greatly influenced how modern historians understand what took place at Bear River on January 29, 1863, she has been criticized for emphasizing her family's role above other survivors' families at the time of the massacre and since. However, her written history and advocacy has proved as an influential perspective for modern historians to understand the legacy and impact of this massacre on the Shoshone people. Through the work of Mae Parry, both the history and the culture of the Northwestern Band of the Shoshone were preserved and passed down to future generations.

Years later, Parry would also write about the religious conversion of the Northwestern band of the Shoshone Nation. Beginning in August 1875, Latter-day Saint missionaries were sent to the Native Americans to offer aid and religious lessons. As a result, many people were baptized. Indeed, Parry stated that all but one man joined the Church of Jesus Christ of Latter-day Saints, mostly because he was afraid of the water, and would need to be baptized by immersion. Mae Timbimboo Parry was an active member of her congregation until the day she died.

== Leadership and activism ==
Parry served as a tribal representative to better negotiate with the United States government and ensure that her people would be treated fairly. In 1968, she and other representatives went to Washington, D.C. to negotiate a bill that would further reduce acreage on Native American reservations. In addition, she worked in 1957 against a bill that would terminate the wardship status of Native Americans in certain states, including the state of Utah. Not only was she an advocate in the Utah legislature, but she also fought at a federal level to ensure that her people were not discriminated against and maintained their civil rights and liberties. Because she was a part of the White House Council of Indian Tribal Affairs, she could create federal programs to better serve Native Americans across the nation. One such resource in the state of Utah was the Native American Graves Protection and Repatriation Act, which returned certain artifacts to the Native American tribes they were originally taken from. In addition, she served on the Utah Indian Cooperative Council, and there she worked to represent the interests of the Northwestern Band of the Shoshone Nation. As the storyteller and matriarch of the Northwestern Band of the Shoshone Nation, it was her responsibility to ensure that certain traditions and histories carried on. She was described as having a knack for winning people over, whether it be at a Shoshone pow wow or at the White House, she could always make others feel at home. This charisma made it easier for her to better help others sympathize with her perspective and understand why certain legislation needed to be passed for the benefit of the Native American people.

== Legacy and recognition ==
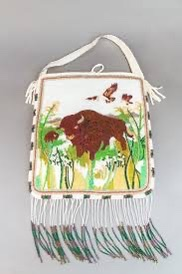
An example of Mae Timbimboo Parry's intricate and detailed beadwork.

Mae Parry was celebrated for all that she did for her people, as well as her outstanding service to the state of Utah. On February 22, 1986, Parry was recognized as the "Utah Honorary Mother of the Year" by the Utah Association of American Mothers. One decade later in 1996, she received the Utah Women's Achievement Award by the Governor's Commission for Women and Families and the Office of Ethnic affairs. Her beadwork, her volunteer hours educating elementary-school children about Native American culture, and her role in the leadership in the Northwestern Band of the Shoshone Nation have also been recognized. Parry used her beadwork as a way to pass on the traditions and legacy of her people and ensure that the rising generation could take part in the art that the Northwestern Band of the Shoshone Nation had done for thousands of years, teaching her children as well as other members of her tribe.

Overall, Parry's lasting legacy was that of rebranding the name of the Battle of Bear River to the Bear River Massacre to better represent the Native American perspective. She is known for her championship of Native American rights on a national and state level, as well as her role as a local leader.
