= Harold Moss (filmmaker) =

American animator and social activist

- Occupations: Animator; Social activist

Harold Moss is an American animator and social activist.

== Biography ==
Moss was trained as a documentary filmmaker.

In 1999, Moss founded FlickerLab, a Manhattan-based animation studio. It is also known for acquiring the Cartoon Broadcast System, invented in 1996, which is used to broadcast animations the same day they are produced.

In 2002, Moss created the animation and provided the voices for a segment of the documentary Bowling for Columbine. The segment was titled A Brief History of the United States.

Moss is also the co-founder of the Climate Ad Project, which he co-founded with Peter Kalmus.

== Filmography ==
- This Modern World (2001)
- Saddle Rash (2002)
- A Brief History of the United States in Bowling for Columbine (2002)
- The Finkel Files (2003)
- Drew Carey's Green Screen Show (2004)
- Fahrenheit 9/11 (2004)
- Fierce People (2006)
- Trouble the Water (2008)
- Prana (2008)
- P.O.V. (2009)
- The Wild Life (2009)
- Capitalism: A Love Story (2009)
- Fat, Sick and Nearly Dead (2011)
- Joy Berry's Handling Emotions (2012)
- Even Gray Feels Blue (2012)
- Keith Lemon: The Film (2012)
- How the Body Works with Chloe and the Nurb (2013)
- Eviolent (2013)
- Story of a Curse (2014)
- Fat, Sick & Nearly Dead 2 (2014)
- National Lampoon: Drunk Stoned Brilliant Dead (2015)
- Thank You for Your Service (2015)
- With a Kiss (2016)
- Roseanne for President! (2016)
- Rooted in Peace (2016)
- Michael Moore in TrumpLand (2016)
- Hamilton's America (2016)
- Some Girls (2017)
- Strong Island (2017)
- Fahrenheit 11/9 (2018)
- Bleed Out (2018)
- The Andorra Hustle (2020)

== Awards and recognition ==
- 2009: Gotham Award and Academy Award nomination for the Trouble the Water
- 2010: Official Prix Jeunesse selection for The Wild Life
