= Frank W. Warner =

Mormon missionary

Frank W. Warner Timbimboo
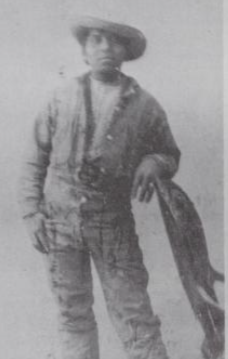
- Frank W. Warner c. 1880.

Personal details
- Born: Beshup Timbimboo; 1861 On the lower Bear River (today's Box Elder County, Utah)
- Died: 1919 (aged 57–58) Parker, Idaho
- Cause of death: Influenza
- Known for: Survived the Bear River Massacre; One of the first Native Americans to serve as a Mormon missionary.

Frank W. Warner (1861–1919) was one of the first Native Americans to serve as a missionary for the Church of Jesus Christ of Latter-day Saints.

Warner was the son of Sagwitch and his wife Tan-tapai-cci. He was originally known as Beshup Timbimboo. He is also sometimes referred to as Pisappih, a Shoshone word from which the name Beshup is derived. He was wounded at the Bear River Massacre at just two years old.

Within the next few years after the Bear River Massacre, Beshup, aged four, trusted to his father's brother-in-law, Tom, as Sagwitch left for a meeting with Mormon leaders, found himself uprooted as Tom grew impatient and "traded him to Mormon Settler Solomon Warner for a bag of beans, a sheep, a sack of flour, and a Mormon Quilt". Sagwitch was "furious" with the trade, but later decided to leave Beshup with the Warner family, as he believed this was the best arrangement for his son. He was traded to Solomon's brother, Amos Warner and his family, a short time later and was given his new name, Frank Warner.

Warner became very well educated and eventually taught penmanship at Brigham Young College. He was first called as a missionary in when he was very young by John Taylor to share the teachings of Mormonism with those in Washakie, Utah. He served as a missionary among the Sioux and Assniboine Tribes in 1914, 1915, and 1917.

Warner died from influenza in 1919 in Parker, Idaho.
