= This Modern World =

American comic strip by Tom Tomorrow

- Several of the main characters in This Modern World. From left to right: Sparky, Biff, and Blinky.
- Author: Tom Tomorrow
- Current status/schedule: Running
- Launch date: April 1986 (in Processed World #16)
- Syndicate(s): self-syndicated
- Genre(s): Humor, Political comics, Satirical comics

This Modern World is a weekly satirical comic strip by cartoonist and political commentator Tom Tomorrow (real name Dan Perkins) that covers current events from a left-wing point of view. Published continuously for more than 30 years, This Modern World appears regularly in more than 80 newspapers across the United States and Canada as of 2015, as well as in The Nation, The Nib, Truthout, and the Daily Kos.

This Modern World has won a number of awards, including the Society of Professional Journalists James Madison Freedom of Information Award and the Robert F. Kennedy Journalism Award (twice); the strip was a finalist for the 2015 Pulitzer Prize for Editorial Cartooning.

== Overview ==
While This Modern World often ridicules those in power, the strip also focuses on the average American's support for contemporary leaders and their policies, as well as the popular media's role in shaping public perception.

The series has been through several incarnations through the years, the first of which appeared in the Suburban High Life comic books published by Slave Labor in the late 1980s. A recurring theme in the comic books (though far less so in subsequent comic strip) was that of "reality engineering", wherein "the very fabric of space and time" is mined for "the good of mankind". This periodically generates "reality discontinuities", where reality breaks down. These are (generally) resolved by reality engineers.

Visually This Modern World draws inspiration from a retro, 1950s sensibility, with brightly colored illustrations that are also inspired by clip art. Initially, the strip was almost completely composed of actual vintage clip art and magazine cutouts, assembled collage-style and often manipulated and retouched. However, Tomorrow has gradually replaced cutouts with his own drawings, which merely mimic the clip art look. Usually drawn in four panels, it is not uncommon for all panels to be identical or nearly so, with only the dialogue and/or facial expressions changing.

The '50s theme extends to the typically verbose dialogue of the strip's human characters, which is often bubbly, over-enthusiastic, and naïve. The stupidity of the humans is countered by Sparky, a fast-talking penguin (although the strip occasionally postulates he is actually an auk) with a red visor, who provides much of the strip's political commentary.

== Publication history ==
Perkins was first published in the Spring 1986 issue of Processed World. He adopted the subject matter of the consumer culture and the drudgery of work, a theme shared by the magazine, and entitled his comic strip This Modern World. In 1990, the strip began to be run in the SF Weekly, before being picked up in the fall of 1991 by the San Francisco Examiner. As his audience expanded, Perkins shifted the focus of the strip to politics. Perkins added papers throughout the 1990s, distributing his comic via self-syndication, a practice he has continued throughout his career.

In 2009, Village Voice Media, publishers of 16 alternative weeklies, suspended all syndicated cartoons across their entire chain. Perkins thereby lost twelve client papers in cities, including Los Angeles, Minneapolis, New York, and Seattle, prompting his friend Eddie Vedder to post an open letter on the Pearl Jam website in support of the cartoonist.

== Characters ==
In addition to any politicians and celebrities depicted, the strip has several recurring characters:

Tom Tomorrow

Tom occasionally appears in his own strips as himself, breaking the fourth wall.

Tom Tomorrow (fictional)

In an "intermediate" version of the strip, a character named Tom Tomorrow was in the strip. He was a private investigator who was dressed in a radiation suit so his face was never seen. He was eventually phased out.

Dippy the Wonder-Penguin

Fictional Tom Tomorrow's sidekick. His vocabulary was limited to "wank".

Sparky the Wonder Penguin

A sort of upgraded version of Dippy (who had been phased out by the time of Sparky's introduction), Sparky is a sunglasses-wearing penguin that can actually talk. Similar to Dippy, Sparky's first words in the strip are "George [H. W.] Bush is a wanker". A strong liberal advocate, he briefly became a Republican after being hit on the head with a random falling toilet.

Blinky the Dog

A small Boston Terrier who shares most of Sparky's political sympathies. Normally very mellow, he briefly became a radical when steroids were put into his food when he was intended to replace the then-Republican Sparky.

Bob Friendly

Mr. Friendly is in charge of the advertising section of This Modern World (thus breaking the fourth wall). It was he who introduced Sparky the Penguin. He appears only occasionally.

Dr. Wilbur von Philbert

One of the longest-running characters in the strip, Dr. von Philbert is the person who discovered how to mine reality for energy.

Biff and Wanda

Two blow-dried news presenters of Action McNews, a newscast in which Tomorrow suggests that most TV news is little more than PR spin. A Biff and Wanda strip almost always ends with a cut to a commercial break ("Now, these messages!").

Biff and Betty

Biff and Betty are two archetypes of 1950s people, who sometimes share their thoughts on the modern world. Biff often appears alone with Sparky, expressing a naive conservative opinion which invariably prompts an exasperated liberal rebuttal from the penguin.

Invisible Hand of the Free Market Man

Invisible Hand of the Free Market Man (abbreviated I.H.O.T.F.M.-Man in dialog in the strip) is a superhero character, wearing what is basically a Superman costume, with an I.H.O.T.F.M.-Man logo (a hand with a letter of IHOTF on each finger, and M in the palm) where the Superman logo would be. I.H.O.T.F.M.-Man's head is a giant left hand with facial features in the palm. I.H.O.T.F.M.-Man is an ardent defender of Adam Smith's invisible hand metaphor, and usually intervenes in situations where the purity of free market economics is in jeopardy. His declarations are often based on principles of free-market economics taken to their logical extreme. The first panel of a comic featuring I.H.O.T.F.M-Man is usually a parody of the cover of Action Comics #1. Often, another character will point out that he is, in fact, not invisible.

Conservative Jones and Moonbat McWacky

Conservative Jones and Moonbat McWacky are two children used in the strip to satirize conservative talking points. Conservative is dressed as a boy detective and asks Moonbat questions about politics. Moonbat gives reasonable answers, which the Conservative turns into illogical statements about liberals.

Public figures

All the presidents since Ronald Reagan have appeared, as well as other political and media figures. Rush Limbaugh is a favorite caricature subject, although he usually talks through a radio and is not personally shown. (He was once, however, depicted as a pig, in a strip parodying the film The Mask.) Conservative columnist Ann Coulter is often the target of particularly unflattering caricatures, usually popping up in the middle of a strip to make a typically inflammatory remark, ending with a guttural "Haw haw haw!" laugh. In a few strips, George W. Bush gets hold of what appears to be the DeLorean from Back to the Future and goes back in time to meet America's Founding Fathers. Karl Rove and Bill O'Reilly make frequent appearances.

Parallel Earth

The strip occasionally visits a parallel Earth, a deliberate parody of our own world. In some strips, Parallel Earth makes wacky political choices which are exaggerated versions of real-world events. In others, the inhabitants of Parallel Earth have made sensible political choices, in contrast to the people of our own world (but wear odd, brightly-colored clothing featuring polka dots).

Small Cute Dog

A small cute dog who was accidentally elected president of Parallel Earth in the year 2000 (and re-elected in 2004), and whose subsequent actions mirrored those of President George W. Bush.

Planet Glox

A pair of tentacle-waving anchor-aliens host a newscast from Planet Glox, resembling Fox News. They report about news strikingly similar to that on Earth, but in factual scientific terminology (i.e., Coneheads-style), thereby making fun, for example, of the public obsession with the sexual activities of public figures, by referring to the global importance of touching reproductive organs.

=== Other recurring elements ===
Supergiant Conglomerated Corporation

A fictitious, stereotypical big business or megacorporation in an unspecified industry, but appears to represent the military-industrial complex. This company has been portrayed as being unethical, manipulative, obsessed with spin, and environmentally unfriendly. Occasionally written as "Supergiant Amalgamated Corporation".

Action McNews

The (presumably local) TV news program on which Biff and Wanda are anchors.

== In other media ==
From 2000 to 2001, an animated This Modern World series was produced by Flickerlab for Mondo Media, with Bob Harris as the voice of Sparky. The show was the top-billed attraction in Mondo Media's lineup of mini-shows; each episode was approximately five minutes long.

=== Crew ===
- Directed by Harold Moss
- Writers: Harold Moss, Tom Tomorrow, Bob Harris
- Executive Producer for Mondo Media: Jan Mallis
- Produced by Angela Webb
- Producer for Mondo Media: Eileen McKee
- Animation Director: Miguel Hernandez
- Animation: Matthew Benton, Anand Nunnally, Kareem Thompson, Angela Moy, Antonio Jimenez
- Assistant Animators: Bill Stout, Matt Bookbinder, D.A. Strawder, Johanna Bystrom
- Illustrations & Backgrounds: Antonio Jimenez
- Sound Record & Mix: Tom Lino

== This Modern Life collections ==
- Tomorrow, Tom; Griffith, Bill (Introduction by) (1992). Greetings from This Modern World. New York: St. Martin's Press. ISBN 978-0-312-08203-1. OCLC 903699001.
- Tomorrow, Tom (1994). Tune in Tomorrow. New York: St. Martin's Press. ISBN 978-0-312-11344-5. OCLC 30594550.
- Tomorrow, Tom (1996). The Wrath of Sparky. New York: St. Martin's Griffin. ISBN 978-0-312-13753-3. OCLC 34356174.
- Tomorrow, Tom; Hitchens, Christopher (Foreword by) (1998). Penguin Soup for the Soul. New York: St. Martin's Griffin. ISBN 978-0-312-19316-4. OCLC 39339312.
- Tomorrow, Tom; Eggers, Dave (Introduction by) (2000). When Penguins Attack!. New York: St. Martin's Griffin. ISBN 978-0-312-20974-2. OCLC 44132892.
- Tomorrow, Tom (2003). The Great Big Book of Tomorrow: a Treasury of Cartoons. New York: St. Martin's Griffin. ISBN 978-0-312-30177-4. OCLC 52086366. – a large omnibus of early work and selected strips
- Tomorrow, Tom (2006). Hell in a Handbasket: Dispatches from the Country Formerly Known As America. New York: J.P. Tarcher/Penguin. ISBN 978-1-585-42458-0. OCLC 61229839.
- Tomorrow, Tom (2008). The Future so Bright: I Can't Bear to Look. New York: Nation Books. ISBN 978-1-568-58402-7. OCLC 608483309.
- Tomorrow, Tom; Moore, Michael (Foreword by) (2011). Too Much Crazy. New York: Soft Skull Press. ISBN 978-1-593-76410-4. OCLC 658117509.
- Tomorrow, Tom; Vedder, Eddie (Foreword by) (2012). The World of Tomorrow. Easthampton, MA: Topataco. ISBN 978-1-936-56173-5. OCLC 903701151.
- Tomorrow, Tom (2016). 25 Years of Tomorrow. Easthampton, MA: Tomorrowco Industries. ISBN 978-1-936-56133-9. OCLC 926736906. – includes pre-Modern World material
- Tomorrow, Tom (2016). Crazy Is the New Normal. San Diego, CA: IDW Publishing. ISBN 978-1-631-40700-0. OCLC 948562092.
- Tomorrow, Tom (2020). Life in the Stupidverse. San Diego, CA: IDW Publishing. ISBN 978-1684056972.
- Tomorrow, Tom (2025). Our Long National Nightmare. Self-published through Kickstarter and Aperiodical Publishing Co. (aperiodical.net). No ISBN.
