= Mary Dann and Carrie Dann =

Native American Western Shoshone activists

The Dann Sisters
- Carrie (left) and Mary Dann, 1979
- Born: January 2, 1923 (Mary); 1932 (Carrie); United States
- Died: April 22, 2005 (aged 82) (Mary); January 2, 2021 (aged 88–89) (Carrie)
- Occupations: Ranching, cultural and spiritual rights, and land rights activists.
- Known for: US Supreme Court case U.S. v. Dann
- Awards: Right Livelihood Award

The Dann Sisters, Mary Dann (1923–2005) and Carrie Dann (1932–2021), were Western Shoshone elders who were spiritual leaders, ranchers, and cultural, spiritual rights and land rights activists. They challenged the federal government over uses of their tribe's traditional land, in a case that reached the United States Supreme Court as U.S. v. Dann.

In 1993 the Dann sisters received the Right Livelihood Award for "exemplary courage and perseverance in asserting the rights of indigenous people to their land." American Outrage (2008) was a documentary film that explored their leadership in the disputes with the federal government over the use of the Western Shoshone territory.

== History ==
In 1863, two years into the American Civil War, the US made the peace Treaty of Ruby Valley with the Western Shoshone, which was to allow US citizens safe passage through their territory, protect Pony Express and other access, and permit mining for gold on their land and future construction of railroads. The US needed the gold to conduct the war against the Confederacy. It defined the Western Shoshone territory as what is now a large portion of Nevada and four other states, as well as the underlying mineral rights, and said the Shoshone would never have to cede their land. It promised payment of annuities in cash or goods equaling $5000 annually for 20 years, but paid only the first year.

Over the ensuing decades, the US acquired much of the Western Shoshone land, largely by Congressional legislation. Most of the land is now held for resource management by federal agencies such as the Bureau of Land Management (BLM) in the Department of Interior and the Department of Energy (DOE). The latter has used some of the land for nuclear testing, and has conducted more than 100 atmospheric tests, "more than anywhere else in the world." DOE has detonated nearly 1000 bombs on this territory.

The Western Shoshone filed suit decades ago to try to reclaim their land. In 1962 the now defunct Indian Claims Court (which expired in 1978) ruled the Shoshone had lost control of their land due to settler encroachment, and they were not entitled to any claim from the US government. As the case proceeded, in 1979 the Indian Claims Commission awarded a $26 million land claim settlement to the Western Shoshone. Part of the case went to federal courts for litigation. The US Supreme Court ruled in 1985 that the Shoshone land claims were extinguished by this financial settlement. The Shoshone refused to take the money, which is earning interest. Eighty percent of the Shoshone who voted on the issue were against accepting the financial settlement; instead, they asked the US to respect the terms of the 1863 treaty. Some Shoshone have wanted the tribe to take the money, and to distribute and invest it for the welfare of the tribe.

Since 1973, the Dann sisters conducted civil protest by ranching and refusing to pay grazing fees to BLM to run their cattle outside their ranch on what they consider Shoshone land. They contended the US had taken the land illegally and not abided by the terms of its treaty.

In 1982, some tribal members organized the Western Shoshone National Council as a governmental group; they elected Raymond Yowell as chief. It is an alternative to what they call the Indian Reorganization Act (IRA) governments of the Duckwater Indian Reservation and Yomba Indian Reservation, which are federally recognized tribes with elected governments. Yowell has worked to ensure the tribes do not accept the settlement money (which was valued at up to $100 million in 1998) because that would extinguish their claims to their former territory.

In 1998, BLM issued trespass notices to the Danns and Raymond Yowell, chief of the Western Shoshone Nation, ordering their removal of hundreds of cows and horses from public lands in Eureka County, Nevada. Carrie and Mary Dann filed a request for urgent action with the United Nations Committee on the Elimination of Racial Discrimination. They had been active in the movement to recover millions of acres of land in Nevada and bordering states that originally belonged to the Western Shoshone tribe.

The Dann sisters persuaded the UN of their case, which subsequently ordered the US government to halt all actions against the Western Shoshone people, a mandate which was mostly ignored.

== Mary Dann ==
Mary Dann (January 2, 1923 – April 22, 2005) (Western Shoshone) was a Native American activist. She died from an accident on her ranch in Crescent Valley, central Nevada, on April 22, 2005.

== Carrie Dann ==
Carrie Dann (1932 – January 1, 2021) was a Western Shoshone spiritual elder and activist for land and tribal rights.

On April 1, 2007, Carrie Dann was arrested with 38 other activists for trespassing at the Nevada Test Site at a Nevada Desert Experience event protesting governmental programs at the site. She has continued with activities to try to end nuclear testing and programs at the site.

In November 2008 Dann, with members of the Western Shoshone Defense Project and four other tribal and public interest groups, sued in federal court against the US and Canadian Barrick Gold, seeking an injunction to stop the "largest open pit cyanide heap leach gold mines in the United States - the Cortez Hills Expansion Project on Mt. Tenabo," Nevada. The Western Shoshone consider this to be sacred land. In addition to spiritual concerns, tribal and other groups are concerned about the proposed project's environmental impact on water, air and ground quality.

== Representation in documentary films ==
- Newe Segobia is Not for Sale (1993) was produced by Jesse Drew. The film depicts confrontations between Federal Bureau of Land Management officers determined to impound the Dann sisters' livestock, and the Danns' demonstration of US treaty violations.
- American Outrage (2008) is a documentary film about the Dann sisters and their decades-long struggle against the U.S. Government for the right to graze their horses on tribal grazing land. The film follows the Dann sisters and tribal rights advocates as the case was ruled on by the US Supreme Court and the United Nations.
