= Tom Tomorrow =

American cartoonist (born 1961)

- Born: Dan Perkins; April 5, 1961 (age 65) Wichita, Kansas, U.S.
- Area: cartoonist
- Notable works: This Modern World
- Awards: full list

Dan Perkins (born April 5, 1961), better known by his pen name Tom Tomorrow, is an American editorial cartoonist. His weekly comic strip, This Modern World, which comments on current events, appears regularly in more than 80 newspapers across the United States and Canada as of 2015, as well as in The Nation, The Nib, Truthout, and the Daily Kos, where he was the former comics curator and now is a regular contributor. His work has appeared in The New York Times, The New Yorker, Spin, Mother Jones, Esquire, The Economist, Salon, The American Prospect, CREDO Action, and on AlterNet.

== Career ==
Perkins was first published in the San Francisco-based anarchist magazine Processed World. He adopted the subject matter of the consumer culture and the drudgery of work, a theme shared by the magazine, and entitled his comic strip This Modern World when it was launched in 1988. (Like many of the magazine's contributors he adopted a pseudonym to avoid retribution from potential employers.)

In 1990, the strip began to be run in the SF Weekly, before being picked up in the fall of 1991 by the San Francisco Examiner. During this time of expanding audiences for Perkins, he shifted the focus of his work to politics. Perkins added papers throughout the 1990s, distributing his comic via self-syndication, a practice he has continued throughout his career.

In 1998, Perkins was asked by editor James Fallows to contribute a bi-weekly cartoon to U.S. News & World Report, but was fired less than six months later, reportedly at the direction of owner Mort Zuckerman.

In 1999, Perkins had an animation deal with Saturday Night Live and produced three animated spots that were never aired. In 2000 and 2001, his online animated series was the top-billed attraction in Mondo Media's lineup of mini-shows, in which the voice of Sparky the Penguin was provided by Jeopardy! champion and author Bob Harris. Perkins has also collaborated with Michael Moore, according to a 2005 interview with the Santa Cruz Metro.

In December 2007, Keith Olbermann devoted the closing segment of an episode of his show to a reading of "Bill O'Reilly's Very Useful Advice for Young People", a two-page cartoon-cover story by Perkins for The Village Voice.

In 2009, Village Voice Media, publishers of 16 alternative weeklies, suspended all syndicated cartoons across their entire chain. Perkins thereby lost twelve client papers in cities including Los Angeles, Minneapolis, New York, and Seattle, prompting his friend Eddie Vedder to post an open letter on the Pearl Jam website in support of the cartoonist. Vedder and Perkins had become friends after meeting at a campaign rally for Ralph Nader in 2000. The collaboration between Pearl Jam and Perkins continued with an invitation to submit cover art for the Backspacer album in 2009. After being selected to provide the cover art for Backspacer, Perkins went on to create a series of Halloween-themed posters for the concerts supporting the album.

In 2015, Perkins was a finalist for the Pulitzer Prize and later in the year, ran a Kickstarter campaign that raised more than $300,000 to publish a career retrospective, 25 Years of Tomorrow.

== This Modern World ==
This Modern World is Perkins' ongoing comic strip that has been published continuously for more than 31 years. While it often ridicules those in power, the strip also focuses on the average American's support for contemporary leaders and their policies, as well as the popular media's role in shaping public perception.

In addition to any politicians and celebrities depicted, the strip has several recurring characters:

- A sunglasses-wearing penguin named "Sparky" and his Boston terrier friend, "Blinky"
- "Biff", a generic conservative often used by Sparky as a foil
- "Conservative Jones", a boy detective whose deductive reasoning satirizes the logic of conservative news analysts and politicians
- The tentacle-waving aliens of planet Glox
- The "Small Cute Dog", who was accidentally elected president on "parallel earth", and whose subsequent actions mirrored those of President George W. Bush
- The "Invisible Hand of the Free Market Man", a superhero figure whose head is shaped like a human hand

In September 2001, he began his blog, also called This Modern World.

== Personal life ==
Perkins, a longtime resident of both San Francisco and Brooklyn, lives in New York City according to his Twitter bio.

== Works and publications ==
Anthologies of This Modern World

- Tomorrow, Tom; Griffith, Bill (Introduction by) (1992). Greetings from This Modern World. New York: St. Martin's Press. ISBN 978-0-312-08203-1. OCLC 903699001.
- Tomorrow, Tom (1994). Tune in Tomorrow. New York: St. Martin's Press. ISBN 978-0-312-11344-5. OCLC 30594550.
- Tomorrow, Tom (1996). The Wrath of Sparky. New York: St. Martin's Griffin. ISBN 978-0-312-13753-3. OCLC 34356174.
- Tomorrow, Tom; Hitchens, Christopher (Foreword by) (1998). Penguin Soup for the Soul. New York: St. Martin's Griffin. ISBN 978-0-312-19316-4. OCLC 39339312.
- Tomorrow, Tom; Eggers, Dave (Introduction by) (2000). When Penguins Attack!. New York: St. Martin's Griffin. ISBN 978-0-312-20974-2. OCLC 44132892.
- Tomorrow, Tom (2003). The Great Big Book of Tomorrow: a Treasury of Cartoons. New York: St. Martin's Griffin. ISBN 978-0-312-30177-4. OCLC 52086366. – a large omnibus of early work and selected strips
- Tomorrow, Tom (2006). Hell in a Handbasket: Dispatches from the Country Formerly Known As America. New York: J.P. Tarcher/Penguin. ISBN 978-1-585-42458-0. OCLC 61229839.
- Tomorrow, Tom (2008). The Future so Bright: I Can't Bear to Look. New York: Nation Books. ISBN 978-1-568-58402-7. OCLC 608483309.
- Tomorrow, Tom; Moore, Michael (Foreword by) (2011). Too Much Crazy. New York: Soft Skull Press. ISBN 978-1-593-76410-4. OCLC 658117509.
- Tomorrow, Tom; Vedder, Eddie (Foreword by) (2012). The World of Tomorrow. Easthampton, MA: Topataco. ISBN 978-1-936-56173-5. OCLC 903701151.
- Tomorrow, Tom (2016). 25 Years of Tomorrow. Easthampton, MA: Tomorrowco Industries. ISBN 978-1-936-56133-9. OCLC 926736906. – includes pre-Modern World material
- Tomorrow, Tom (2016). Crazy Is the New Normal. San Diego, CA: IDW Publishing. ISBN 978-1-631-40700-0. OCLC 948562092.
- Tomorrow, Tom (2020). Life in the Stupidverse. San Diego, CA: IDW Publishing. ISBN 978-1684056972.
- Tomorrow, Tom (2025). Our Long National Nightmare. Canada: TMW Press. ISBN 978-1733495455.

Children's picture book

- Tomorrow, Tom (2009). The Very Silly Mayor. Brooklyn, NY: Ig Pub. ISBN 978-1-935-43901-1. OCLC 313077654. – a picture book for children aged 4–8

== Awards ==
- 1993 Media Alliance Meritorious Achievement Award (MAMA)
- 1995 Society of Professional Journalists James Madison Freedom of Information Award
- 1998 Robert F. Kennedy Journalism Award, Cartoon, for This Modern World
- 2000 Association for Education in Journalism and Education, Professional Freedom and Responsibility Award
- 2001 James Aronson Award for Social Justice Journalism
- 2003 Robert F. Kennedy Journalism Award, Cartoon, for This Modern World
- 2004 AltWeekly Award, Cartoon (More than five papers), 2nd Place, for This Modern World
- 2006 AltWeekly Award, Cartoon (Four or more papers), 3rd Place, for This Modern World
- 2013 Herblock Prize for editorial cartooning
- 2014 Association of Alternative Newsmedia second place award for cartooning
- 2015 First Place, Cartoon category, Association of Alternative Newsmedia (AAN) Awards
- 2015 Comic Strip Gold Medal in the Society of Illustrators' Comic and Cartoon Art Annual competition
- 2015 Pulitzer Prize for Editorial Cartooning finalist
- 2024 Clifford K. and James T. Berryman Award for Editorial Cartoons
