= Elijah Nicholas Wilson =

American pioneer and author (1842–1915)

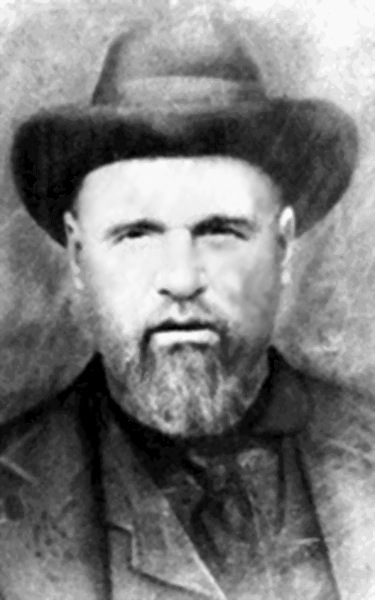
- Born: April 8, 1842
- Died: December 26, 1915 (aged 73)
- Occupations: Mormon pioneer, author
- Notable work: Among the Shoshones

Elijah Nicholas Wilson (April 8, 1842 - December 26, 1915) was known as "Yagaiki" when among the Shoshones, and in his later years as "Uncle Nick" when entertaining young children with his adventurous exploits. He was a Mormon American pioneer, childhood runaway, "adopted" brother of Shoshone Chief Washakie, Pony Express rider for the Central Overland California and Pikes Peak Express Company, stagecoach driver for Ben Holloday's Overland Stage, blacksmith, prison guard, farmer, Mormon bishop, prison inmate (unlawful cohabitation), carpenter/cabinet maker, fiddler, trader, trapper, and "frontier doctor" (diphtheria and smallpox).

In 1859, Wilson was guide to General Albert Sidney Johnston when he led a company from Camp Floyd to hunt down Western Shoshone people in retaliation for a raid on a caravan. According to Wilson's account, Johnston's army massacred 350 men and an unknown number of women and children in the Spring Valley Massacre.

Wilson is remembered today due to the publication of derivative works based upon, and later-day republications of, his 1910 autobiography entitled Among the Shoshones, such as The White Indian Boy: The Story of Uncle Nick Among the Shoshones (a volume of the World Book Company's In Pioneer Life Series), The White Indian Boy, and its sequel The Return of the White Indian. He founded Wilson, Wyoming. His life was highlighted in the 2000 movie Wind River.

There is some evidence that suggests that Wilson was not the author of The White Indian Boy. The Morgan County News reported in its 28 August 1959 edition, that "'White Indian Boy', was written by a man named Howard Driggs."
