= Spring Valley (White Pine County, Nevada) =

Valley in Nevada, United States

Spring Valley is a long north south trending basin, largely in White Pine County, Nevada and a small portion in the extreme south in Lincoln County, Nevada. It extends from 39°59′00″N 114°29′33″W in White Pine County to the north to 38°33′57″N 114°21′05″W in the south in Lincoln County. The bottom of the basin is at Yelland Dry Lake at an elevation of 5,551 feet (1,692 meters). Bahsahwahbee, a grove of Rocky Mountain juniper trees, locally called swamp cedars, where multiple massacres of Western Shoshone people occurred in the 19th century, lies in Spring Valley. The Spring Valley Wind Farm is to its south.

The Deep Synoptic Array, a radio telescope consisting of about 1650 small antennas, is being planned for construction in Spring Valley.
