= Bahsahwahbee =

- U.S. National Register of Historic Places
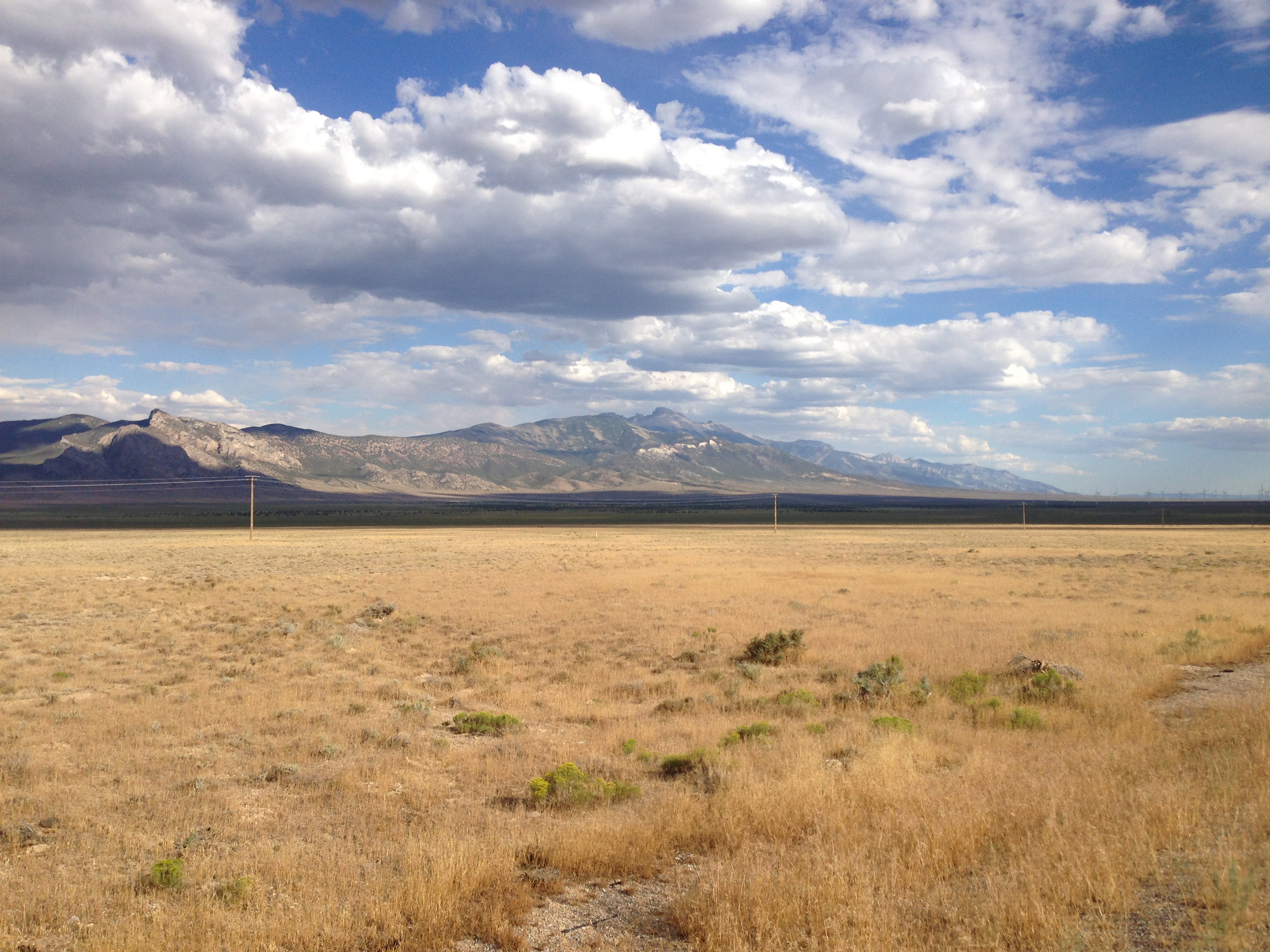
- View of Wheeler Peak from Nevada State Route 893, looking southwest. Bahsahwahbee lies in the valley below.

- Location within Nevada Location within the United States
- Location: 5 miles northeast of Majors Place, Nevada
- Coordinates: 39.14°N 114.45°W
- Area: 14,175 acres (57.36 km^{2})
- NRHP reference No.: 100000464
- Added to NRHP: May 1, 2017

Bahsahwahbee is a grove of Rocky Mountain juniper trees, locally called swamp cedars, in White Pine County, Nevada, where multiple massacres of Western Shoshone people occurred in the 19th century, two by the U.S. Army and one by vigilantes. The name means "sacred water valley" in the Shoshoni language. The area is managed by the Bureau of Land Management (BLM) and is located 8 mi (13 km) northwest of Great Basin National Park, 5 mi (8.0 km) northeast of Majors Place.

The grove was listed on the National Register of Historic Places in 2017 as a traditional cultural property.

== Ecology ==
Spring Valley is a north–south valley between the Snake Range and Schell Creek Range in the Great Basin region that covers much of Nevada. More than 100 springs are in the valley. The valley's abundance of water in the soil, trapped by a shallow layer of clay forming a perched water table, allows the Rocky Mountain juniper (Juniperus scopulorum), also called swamp cedars, take root at ground level. This is the largest of three areas they grow in a valley rather than dry, rocky mountainsides. The cone-bearing evergreen trees reach up to 40 feet tall. The slender thelypody (Thelypodium sagittatum) is also endemic to this region of the Great Basin.

== History ==
Western Shoshone and Goshute people (Newe) have their homeland in northern Nevada and have lived in the Bahsahwahbee area since time immemorial. Archaeological artifacts in Spring Valley date to at least 10,000 years ago. These peoples typically lived in small family groups, but Bahsahwahbee was the place where they came together to engage in ceremonial activities. At seasonal events, including the Round Dance in the fall and Grass Dance in the spring, they took part in giving thanks to Mother Nature, religious customs, gathering food and hunting, and meeting with other tribes.

Westward expansion of the United States accelerated in the late 1840s and 1850s as American settlers sought gold in California and new lands and opportunities. The California Trail, one of the Emigrant Trails, and the Overland Trail passed through Newe lands in northern Nevada. The emigrants depleted the Indians' food and water supplies, causing the starvation of Newe, whose population had already suffered from smallpox epidemics. Conflict between Indians and white Americans continued as emigration increased, but an 1855 peace treaty with the Newe was not ratified by the United States, allowing for tensions and violence to worsen.

=== Spring Valley Massacre of 1859 ===
Beginning in May 1859, Army Captain James H. Simpson surveyed a new route across the Great Basin to California, resulting in increased emigrant traffic through Newe territory and further disruption of their resources and lifestyles. On August 13, 1859, a detachment of U.S. cavalry led by Lieutenant Ebenezer Gay tracked down a band of Indian warriors that had massacred an emigrant train to California. His troops engaged the warriors at Devil's Gate Canyon, about 30 miles northeast of Swamp Cedars. His report of August 15 stated: "I went into camp, and two hours afterwards had reliable information that a large body of Indians were probably encamped somewhere in the canon leading from this valley to Cache valley. I was informed at the same time, that within five or six days past they had stolen a number of animals from this and the adjoining settlements, and that they were the same party who had murdered and robbed an emigrant train on Sublett's cut-off. I immediately resolved to attack them... After a rapid march of two hours, the encampment was indicated by a number of ponies grazing, and in a moment afterwards by the Indians jumping up from their beds under the bushes... I immediately formed my men and charged upon the main body of them; in this charge several of the enemy were killed and wounded. They then scattered and took position behind rocks, &c., &c.; here they were charged and driven up precipices beyond the reach of men on horses... The guide and many others estimated the Indian force at from 150 to 200 warriors. The number killed was about twenty, as near as we can calculate. I had no men killed, but four severely though probably not mortally, and two slightly wounded... The company behaved nobly on this occasion."

In November 1859, Gay's commander, brevet Brigadier General Albert Sidney Johnston reported the incident to Major General Winfield Scott: "I have ascertained that three [emigrant] parties were robbed, and ten or twelve of their members, comprising men, women, and children, murdered... The perpetrators of the robbery of the first party were severely chastised by a detachment of dragoons, under the command of Lieutenant Gay. The troops failed to discover the robbers of the last two parties that were attacked. They are supposed to be vagabonds from the Shoshonee (sic) or Snake and Bannack (sic) Indians, whose chiefs deny any complicity with these predatory bands. There is abundant evidence to prove that these robber bands are accompanied by white men, and probably instigated and led by them. On that account I am inclined to believe the disclaimer of the Indians referred to, of having any knowledge of the robberies or any share in the plunder."

The Mountaineer Newspaper reported that on August 14, 1859, "Brevet Brigadier General Albert S. Johnston, Colonel 2nd Cavalry, commanding department of Utah, having received information that a band of northern Indians had robbed and murdered a party of emigrants on the California road, detached 2nd Lieutenant Ebenezer Gay, 2nd Dragoons, in command of Company G, 2nd Dragoons, from Camp Floyd, to take such steps as circumstances might require. The latter learning, near Box Elder, that the Indians were not distant, resolved to attack them... Lieutenant Gay surprised the encampment of the Indians, and charged upon the main body, killing and wounding several. The number of the Indians is estimated from one hundred and fifty to two hundred warriors, of whom some twenty were killed; twenty horses were captured, nearly half being American horses; four men severely, and two slightly wounded; and nine horses wounded."

Possibly referencing the same event, Elijah Nicholas Wilson, who claimed to be one of the army's interpreters and guides, published a book of anecdotes in 1910 that claimed that 350 Indians were killed by the troops on an unspecified date in somewhere in the Utah Territory in 1859. Wilson's account has no mention of Spring Valley. Oral histories that rely heavily on Wilson's account also reference the event but there is no substantiation by contemporary documentary evidence. In addition, there is some evidence that suggests that Wilson was not the actual author of his account. The Morgan County News reported in its 28 August 1959 edition that "'White Indian Boy', was written by a man named Howard Driggs." There are no other written accounts of the claimed incident.

=== Swamp Cedars Massacre of 1863 ===
The U.S. Army established Fort Ruby in White Pine County in 1862 to protect white emigrants. At this time, the Newe faced severe starvation and resorted to eating grains given by the Overland Mail Company and even undigested barley from horses' manure. Stationed at Fort Ruby, Colonel Patrick Connor instructed his troops to "destroy every male Indian whom you may encounter."

On March 22, 1863, Goshute warriors attacked a stage station near Spring Valley, killing the company operator and taking stock animals. In retribution, Captain S. P. Smith led a cavalry company to seek out those responsible. Discovering an Indian encampment at Duck Creek on May 3, they massacred 24 Indians in their sleep and five more who arrived at the camp the next day. Two days later, the company attacked another Indian camp in the Bahsahwahbee area. Military records state they massacred another 23 Indians, though others were able to escape because some of the Army's horses became stuck in the swamp. Goshute oral history states "most of them" were killed.

Five months after this Goshute War, the Newe signed the Treaty of Ruby Valley that gave the United States significant rights to the use of their land.

=== Swamp Cedars Massacre of 1897 ===
The third massacre at Bahsahwahbee, as reported through oral histories, was committed by vigilantes in 1897. False accusations that the Newe's gatherings were to prepare for war led settlers to target the Newe at their seasonal events. Self-appointed militia members are told to have followed Indians to the Swamp Cedars site where tribal members were gathered for a harvest festival. The attackers raped the women and killed almost everyone there, who were largely women, children, and elders, as the men were away hunting. Only two young girls survived the massacre.

By the 1930s, 16 small villages remained in Spring Valley.

=== Modern use ===
Since the three massacres, the Newe have a spiritual connection to Bahsahwahbee as a place where their ancestors lived and died. The site went from being a place of celebration to a place of commemoration, where the swamp cedar trees each represent those killed. The site's waters and springs are considered sacred, and the Newe – now organized as the Ely Shoshone Tribe, the Duckwater Shoshone Tribe, and the Confederated Tribes of the Goshute Reservation – also continue to use it for gathering of plants and hunting.

== Designation and protection ==
The Bureau of Land Management designated 3,200 acres (13 km^{2}) as the Swamp Cedar Area of Critical Environmental Concern (ACEC) in 2008, affording that portion protections including limits on off-road vehicle use, plant collection, cattle grazing, and surface mining.

In 2017, an area encompassing 14,175 acres (57.36 km^{2}) was listed on the National Register of Historic Places as a traditional cultural property. It lies between White Pine County Road 893, White Pine County Road 37, U.S. Route 50, and the Spring Valley Wind Farm, entirely on Bureau of Land Management land.

The Swamp Cedar Natural Area is a historic resource of the Great Basin National Heritage Area.

Native American tribes opposed a water pipeline that would have brought groundwater from Spring Valley and others in the county to Las Vegas; the potential depletion of the aquifer could have affected the swamp cedars, and plans for the pipeline were canceled in 2020. A 2021 Nevada law made it illegal to cut or destroy any swamp cedars in the Bahsahwahbee area without a permit. The bill was requested by Native American advocates, though state agencies stated protection of the area is the responsibility of the Bureau of Land Management, rather than the state.

In 2021, the Nevada Legislature passed a resolution in support of federal protection of the area, the Senate doing so unanimously. Advocates have proposed the site, with a suggested area of 27,240 acres (110.2 km^{2}), be added to Great Basin National Park or protected as a national monument managed by the National Park Service. In 2023, Senators Catherine Cortez Masto and Jacky Rosen called on Interior Secretary Deb Haaland to support making the site a national monument. Cortez Masto visited the site in July 2023 and Rosen in August.

A portion of the proposed Bahsahwahbee National Monument that is outside of the ACEC would be open to solar power development under the BLM's Western Solar Plan, resulting in objections from local advocates; any potentially proposed project would be subject to further consultation.

== See also ==
- List of Indian massacres in North America
- Bear River Massacre
