= Jesse Drew =

American artist, author, media activist, and educator

- Born: New York, NY
- Education: University of Texas San Francisco State University
- Known for: Video Art
- Notable work: Manifestoon
- Movement: media art, documentary
- Awards: Best Documentary at University of Cincinnati Film Festival, Festival Award at Hallwalls Festival
- Website: www.jessedrew.com

Jesse Drew is an American artist, author, media activist, and educator.

== Biography ==
Jesse Drew was born at St. Vincent's Hospital in Greenwich Village, New York. He spent his early childhood in Queens, before the family moved to Hicksville, New York, home of Levittown. He became a teenage runaway at age 15, and lived on communes in Vermont and California. In 1974, he was a candidate for the State Legislature of Vermont on the Liberty Union Party ticket with Bernie Sanders. Because of his runaway status, he ran under the name of Jesse Clemens. In 1975, he was recruited by Fred Ross to work for the United Farmworkers Union in California. He was a boycott organizer in San Francisco before moving into industrial organizing in the San Francisco Bay Area

In 1982, he moved to Paris, France with his wife and child and became involved in media production. Upon returning to the United States in 1984, he joined the nascent video collective Paper Tiger TV, and started a West Coast branch. At the same time, he began working as an electronics technician at several start-ups and then Dolby Laboratories. He worked with the 'zine collective Processed World as a writer, editor and collective member. In 1986, he helped to organize the first public access television network, Deep Dish TV and in 1989, formed Mission Creek Video with Carla Leshne in San Francisco's Mission District.

He is a professor in the Cinema and Technocultural Studies (CaTS) program at the University of California at Davis.

== Media work ==
Drew has worked extensively on community media projects including the San Francisco Community Television and Paper Tiger Television. He has also been an advocate for Low-power broadcasting and helped found KDRT-LP radio, a low power FM station in Davis, California. His work has shown at the 1993 Whitney Biennial, the Mill Valley Film Festival, Artists' Television Access, Yerba Buena Center for the Arts, American Film Institute, and others.

Manifestoon is one of Drew's best known works. The film is a collage of classic cartoons edited to illustrate the narration: Karl Marx and Friedrich Engels' Communist Manifesto. When the clips are re-contextualized, the subversive nature of "the trickster" character in classic cartoons is presented in a new perspective. The video has been shown at large institutions such as Yerba Buena Center for the Arts, Museum of Contemporary Art, Chicago, and Barcelona Cultural Center and uploaded to web sites like the Internet Archive and YouTube. Nicole Brenez, the curator of Cinematheque in France listed Manifestoon as one of the top ten films of the 1990s.

Newe Segobia is Not for Sale was produced by Drew in 1993, documenting the land struggle between Western Shoshone sisters Mary Dann and Carrie Dann and the BLM.

== Writing ==
In 2013, Jesse Drew wrote the book "A Social History of Contemporary Democratic Media." His work has been published in Resisting the Virtual Life (City Lights Press) and Reclaiming San Francisco: History, Politics, Culture (City Lights Press) as well as Processed World, and Collectivism After Modernism: The Art of Social Imagination After 1945 (University of Minnesota Press).
