= Yelland Dry Lake =

Playa and flat in Spring Valley in White Pine County, Nevada

Coordinates: 39°20′33″N 114°25′36″W

Yelland Dry Lake, also known as Dry Lakes, is a playa and flat in Spring Valley in White Pine County, Nevada. Its lowest point lies at an elevation of 5,551 feet (1,692 meters). It has been the site of several meteorites.
