= Sagwitch =

Northern Shoshone chieftain (1822–1887)

Sagwitch Timbimboo
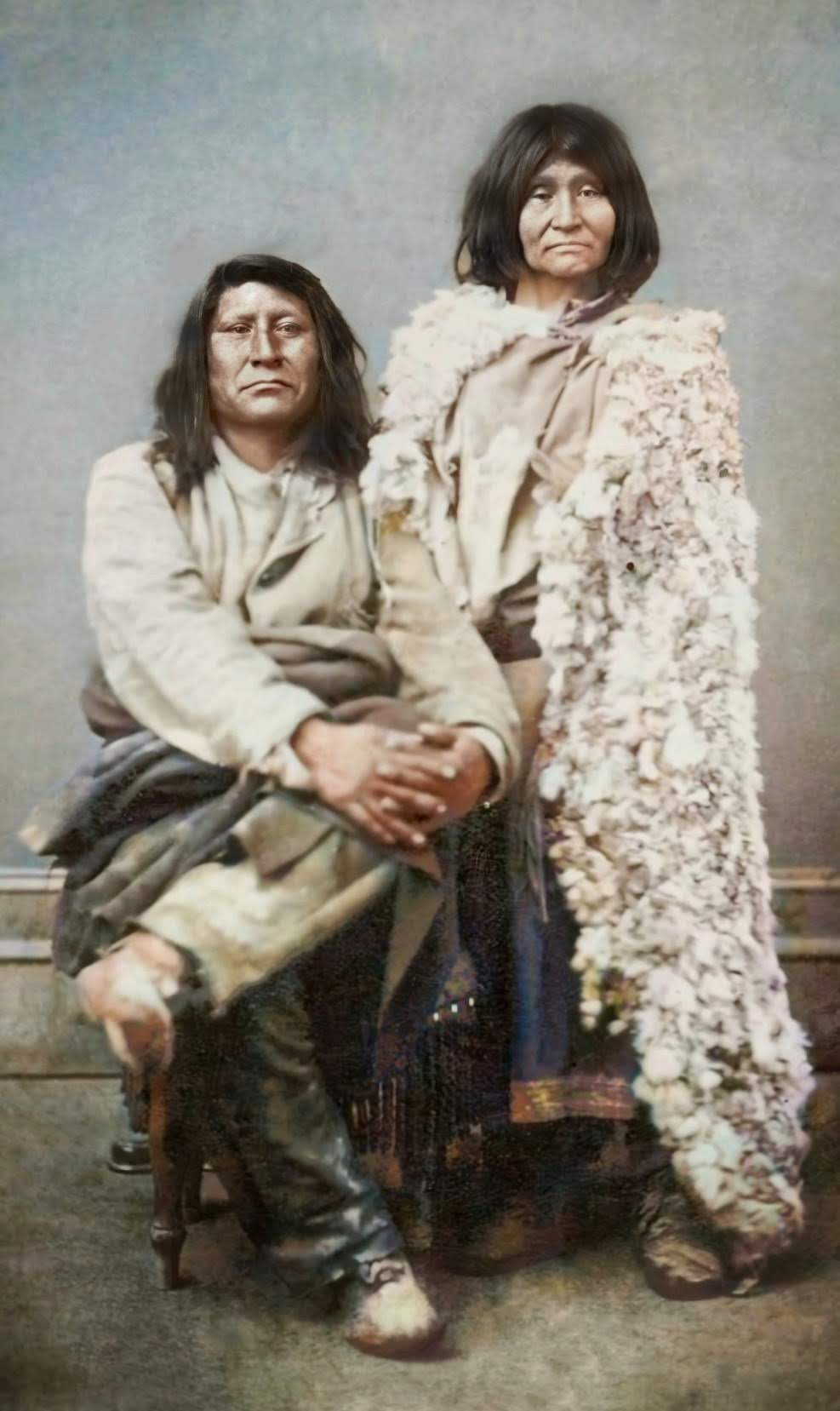
- Chief Sagwitch and spouse Beawoachee

Northwestern Shoshone leader

Personal details
- Born: 1822 On the lower Bear River (today's Box Elder County, Utah)
- Died: March 20, 1887 (aged 64–65) Washakie Utah
- Known for: Survived the Bear River Massacre; settled Washakie, Utah
- Nickname: "Orator"

Sagwitch Timbimboo (1822 – March 20, 1887), which translates to "Speaker" and "One Who Writes on Rocks," was a nineteenth-century chieftain of a band of Northwestern Shoshone that converted to The Church of Jesus Christ of Latter-day Saints. Of his tribe, he was one of the very few survivors of the horrific Bear River Massacre (January 29, 1863), which is considered the greatest loss of Indigenous life through wars with Anglo-Saxon people. Within the battle, Chief Sagwitch led his people away from the preemptive attack that the United States government had levied upon the people. Losing the majority of his own tribe, Chief Sagwitch helped rebuild his tribe and as the leader, led his people to a thriving life. Living the majority of his life in what is now Cache Valley, which is located in Northeast Utah and Southeast Idaho, Chief Sagwitch was an instrumental leader within the Shoshone Tribe and within the Church of Jesus Christ of Latter-day Saints. Helping build a temple with the Latter-day Saints in Logan, Utah, Chief Sagwitch became an Elder for the Church shortly after his conversion in 1873. Along with Chief Sagwitch being baptized, 101 of His tribe members also took the oath of baptism. Chief Sagwitch died on March 20, 1887, leaving a lasting legacy as an influential member of the Indigenous community.

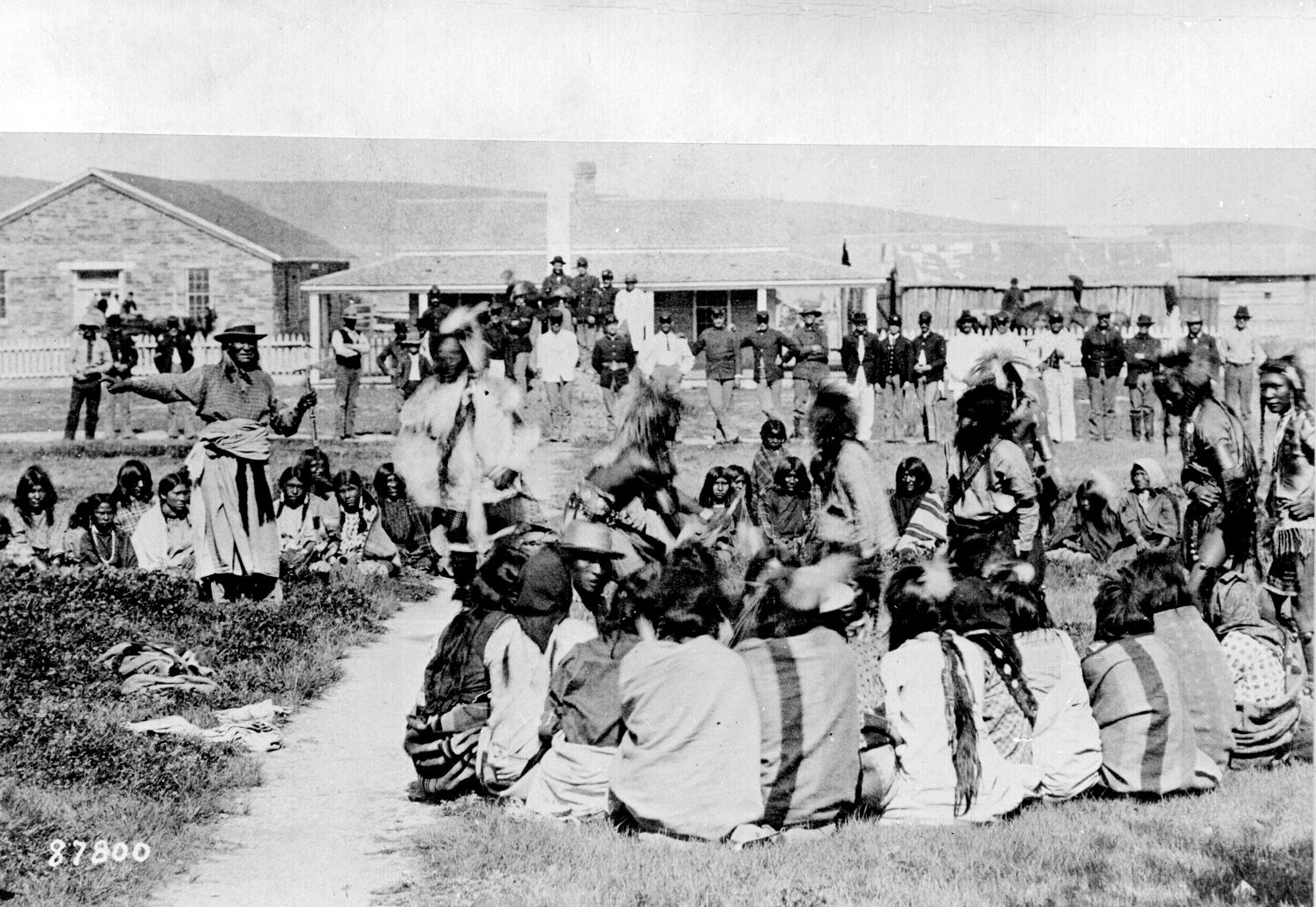
Northern Shoshone Indians gathered at Ft. Washakie WY

== Early life (1822–1862) ==
Chief Sagwitch, born with the name Sagwip, lived a traditional Northwest Shoshone lifestyle. This included traditional hunting and gathering techniques, thriving off of the wildlife in and around Bear Lake. At a young age, young Sagwip did His first initiation into the Shoshone tribe, which included rolling in the snow naked. At a young age, Sagwip was keen with hunting and making of weapons, developing quicker than most children within the tribe at the time.

In 1840, Sagwitch had two wives with lots of responsibility in His family camp. Due to his talented speaking skills, the teenager’s name was then changed to Sagwitch, which translates to “speaker” or "orator."

Though EuroAmerican hunters had been in the area for years to trade, White Americans began surfacing around the region in 1847, which saw a significant rise in the animal pelt industry. Once whites settled in the region in 1847, Sagwitch joined the business and hunted animals such as Black Bears and Bison for the sale of pelts and meat. In 1847, Sagwitch and other Shoshone leaders travelled to Salt Lake City to meet with fellow leaders of the Latter-day Saints church and even the Prophet, Brigham Young, learning that the settlement of Latter-day Saint people was due to religious exile. In 1855, members of the Church of Jesus Christ settled in the Cache Valley region. Upon the arrival of the Latter-day Saints, life for Sagwitch and members of His tribe changed drastically. Members began to settle all over Cache Valley, which limited the gathering, grazing, and hunting for Sagwitch and His tribe. The members of the church, who were all white, did not have a consistent relationship with the Shoshone tribe, as the natural resources in the area became scarce.

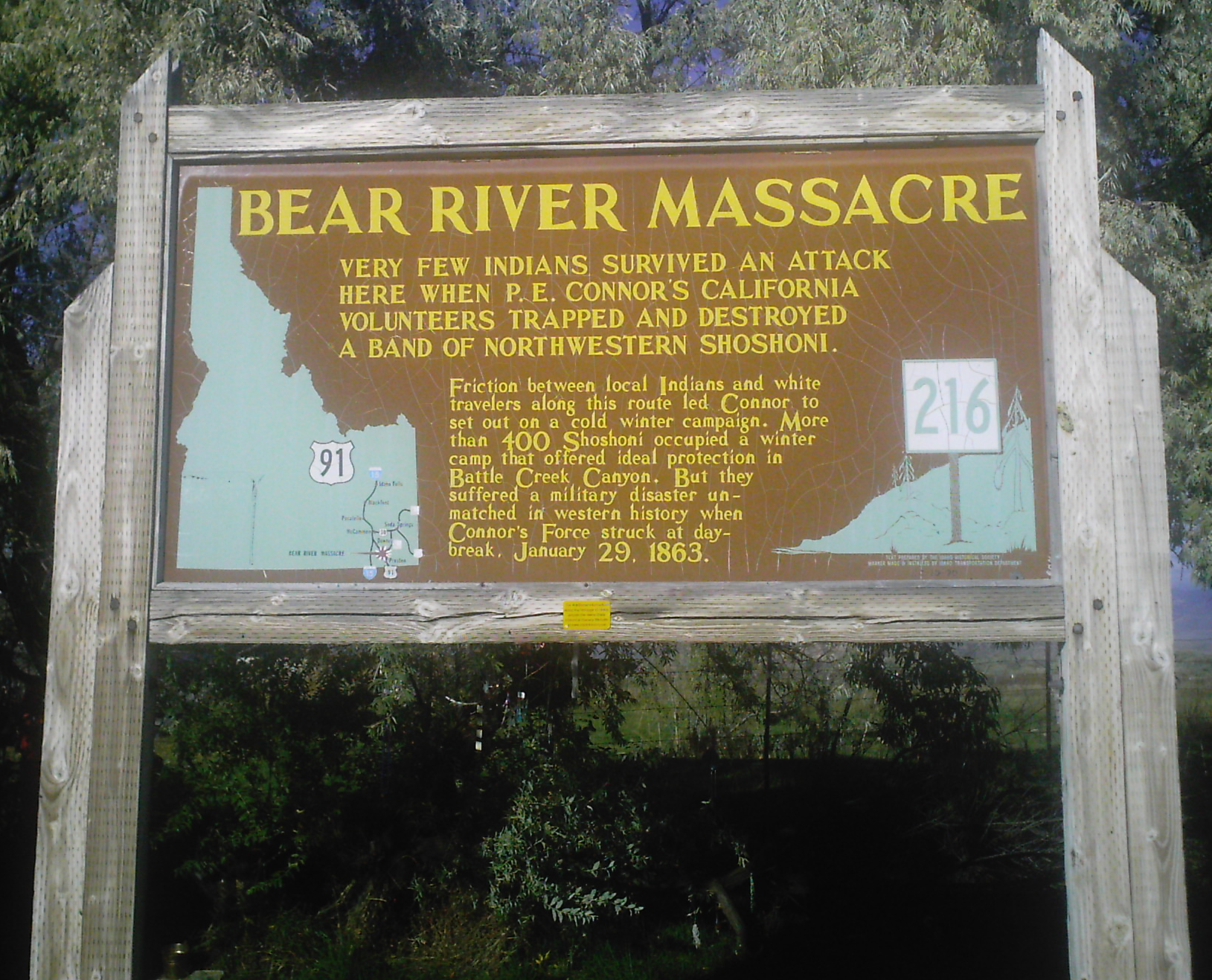
Memorial of The Bear River Massacre near Franklin ID

== Northwestern Shoshone Tribe ==
The Shoshone tribe, also known as the Shoshoni people, history is in the Great Basin region, which covers a region of Nevada, Utah, Idaho, and Wyoming, with many tribes and families spread across the area. The Western Shoshone in specific were banded together in small groups of families who were scattered across the area. Their lifestyle would include gathering and hunting, using the Bear River and Bear Lake as a significant source of food and water. The Shoshone battled with other local and rivaling tribes, such as the Blackfoot, Lakota, and others. After the emergence of white people in the areas, the Shoshone died due to sickness and different skirmishes that happened. The Bear River Massacre is the worst single loss for the Shoshone tribe, losing an estimated 250-400 men, women, and children. After the 19th century, the groups of Shoshone began to diminish, leading them to join other groups or die off completely. According to the 2020 Census, there are approximately 6,000 members of the Shoshone people, a number that is only 50% of what the population of Shoshone were in the 2000 Census.

== Bear River Massacre ==
For much of the late 1800’s, white settlers and members of the Church of Jesus Christ of Latter-day Saints moved west to settle what is now Utah and Idaho. As members of the church began to explore more of what is currently Northern Utah, encounters with the Northwestern Shoshone became more and more prevalent. Local tribes, having lost certain hunting regions to new settlers while facing starvation from consecutively harsh winters began to pillage local crop farmers and ranchers. The pillaging consisted of crops and cattle from small communities found in both Cache and Franklin counties; what is now considered Cache Valley.

On 29 January 1863, near Franklin Idaho in what is currently the city of Preston, Chief Timbimboo and his Shoshone Indians were ambushed. Sagwitch was lucky enough to have survived the Bear River massacre with a few painful injuries. His wife was not so fortunate and perished amongst the others. Approximately 300 men, women and children were either killed or injured during the massacre. The raid was carried out by a voluntary group of soldiers from California. The group was led by Col. Patrick E Connor, a seasoned war veteran.

== Family ==
In the late 1830s, during his early teen years, Sagwitch married Egyptitcheeadaday (Icappíh-tí-cciattattai), which has a meaning of “coyote niece”. In 1840, at the age of 18, Sagwitch married his second wife, Hewechee (Haai-wicci), which translates to “mourning dove.” Even at the young age of 18, Sagwitch had the land and hunting means and was able to live with two wives. In 1846, his first wife, Egyptitcheeadaday, gave birth to a boy named Tuinipucci (Tua-na-ppucci), who also acquired the name Soquitch (Soo-kuiccih), was the first child to live to adulthood. In 1848, Sagwitch and his second wife, Hewechee, gave birth to his second son, Taputsi, who was later renamed Yeager. In 1861, his wife Dadabaychee gave birth to another son named Beshup (Pisappíh). Beshup became known as Timbimboo, translating to “one who writes on rocks,” which later become the last name of Sagwitch’s descendants. His second wife, Hewechee, died in 1862 and his first daughter was born of his third wife, with his daughter’s name being unknown. During the Massacre, Dadabaychee, his third wife was killed by the army. Shortly after the massacre, Sagwitch married a woman named Wongosoff, who soon died while in captivity of the army. In 1865, Sagwitch married his fifth wife, the only living wife at the time, Beawoachee. Frank W. Warner, born Pisappih "Red Oquirrh" Timbimboo, was largely raised by the Amos Warner family after his mother was killed during the Bear River Massacre. Sagwitch also had a grandson, Moroni Timbimboo. Though Sagwitch and his wives may have birthed other children during their early years, there is no record of the children living past adolescence.

== Church service ==
In 1873, Sagwitch was baptized and confirmed as a member of the Church of Jesus Christ of Latter-day Saints (LDS Church) by George Washington Hill. The rest of Sagwitch's band, totalling about 100 people, were also baptized into the LDS Church. Sagwitch went on to receive priesthood and was ordained to the office of an Elder. Later on, in 1875, Sagwitch and his wife were sealed in the Endowment House, an ordinance performed by Wilford Woodruff. Frank became one of the first Native Americans to serve as a missionary for the LDS Church. Sagwitch's grandson Moroni Timbimboo was the first Native American to serve as a bishop in the church. Sagwitch and his family also contributed labor towards the building of the Logan Utah Temple. In 1880, Sagwitch and his band settled in Washakie, Utah. They operated a small church farm there. Today Washakie is a ghost town.

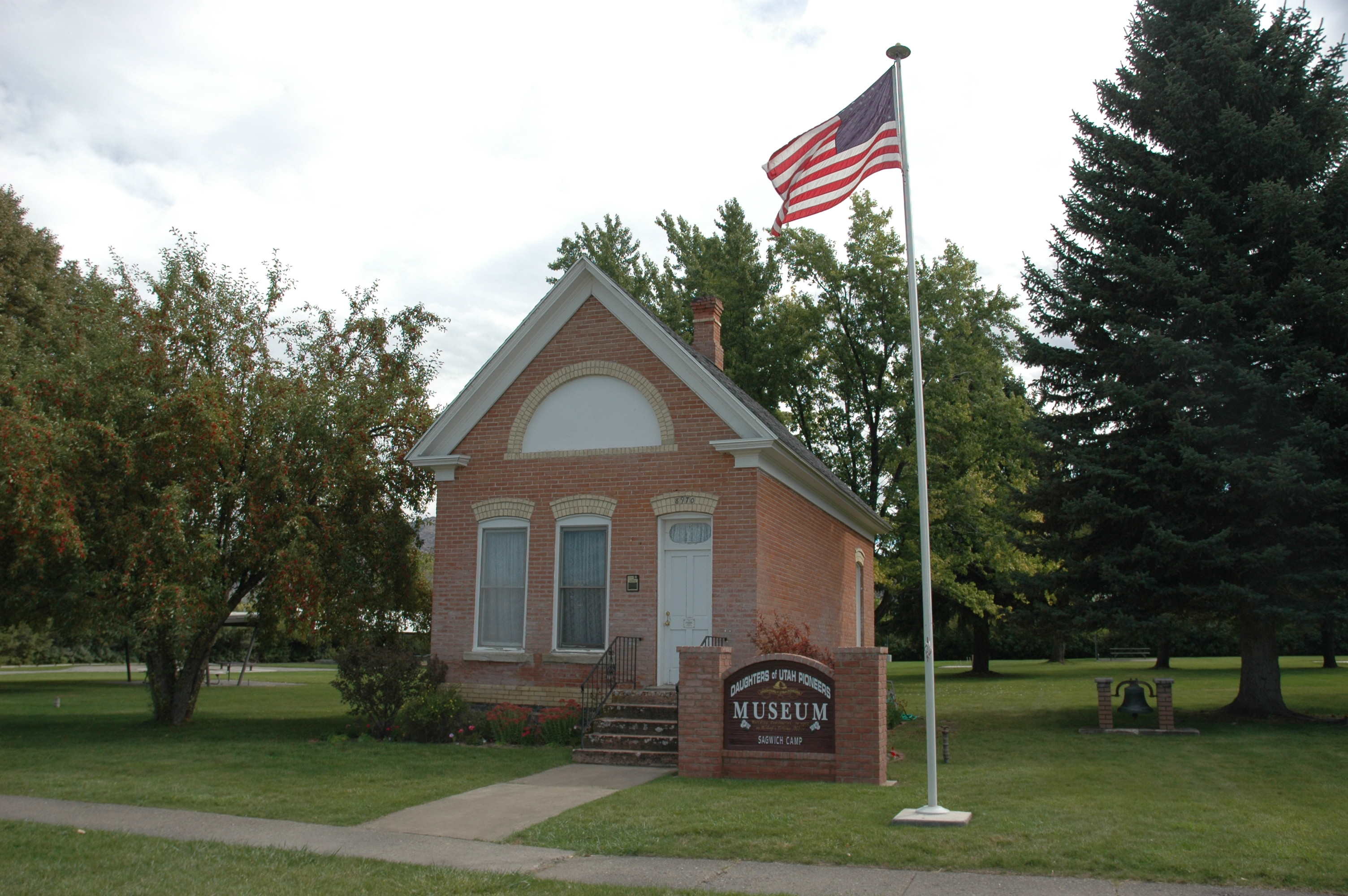
The Daughters of Utah Pioneer building near Avon Utah serves as a small museum for Chief Sagwitch.

== Camp Sagwitch ==
Chief Sagwitch and his band of Shoshone Indians were constantly moving around Cache Valley to find resources. The tribe often camped in a small saddle near Paradise Utah. Chief Timbimboo’s band was seen frequenting this area so often that the local settlers began to call it “Sagwitch basin”. Sagwitch basin is in the Southern most part of Cache Valley located near what is today, Porcupine Reservoir.

The naming of Sagwitch Basin was popular amongst locals in the small communities of Paradise and Avon. Boy Scouts, church groups, historians and an assortment of other people have made a tradition of hiking the steep mountainside to camp overnight where Sagwitch and his people once found refuge. One local group of performers has even adopted the name and brandished it as part of their identity. The Sagwitch Basin Boys, made up of three friends and a daddy daughter duo, can be found performing western ballads and folk songs at the annual Mountain Man Rendezvous in Cache Valley.

Regular rendezvous and fur-trading posts became an important part of life for both early settlers and native Americans alike. Semi-nomadic tribes like the Northwestern Shoshone relied heavily on rendezvous for renewed supplies during difficult times. Guns, ammunition, horses, metals, and many other valuables were accessible at events like The Rocky Mountain Rendezvous. Each spring, citizens of Cache Valley and outsiders alike come from far and wide to experience moments like those had by fur traders and the Shoshone Indians.

A biography of Sagwitch by Scott R. Christensen entitled Sagwitch: Shoshone Chieftain, Mormon Elder, 1822-1887 was published by Utah State University Press in 1999.
