= Wind power in Nevada =

Electricity from wind in one U.S. state

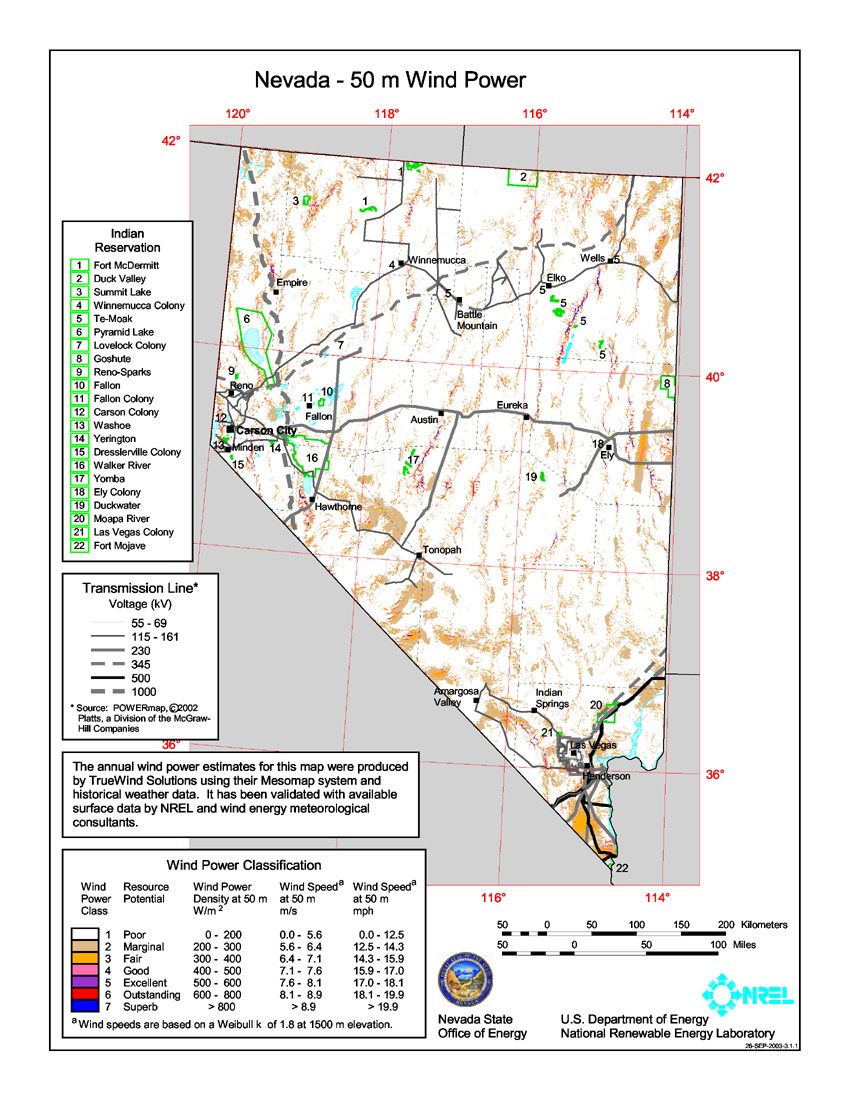
Nevada wind resources

The U.S. state of Nevada has a quite limited potential capacity for onshore wind power generation, ranking 29th among the states. The NREL estimates that the potential for 7.2 GW of wind generation capacity exists in Nevada, which could generate 17,709 GW·h per year (roughly 60% of the state's electric demand).

As of 2016, Nevada hasdjust 152 MW installed in one farm, the Spring Valley Wind project, which commenced operation in 2012. Wind power was responsible for 0.9% of in-state electricity produced in 2016.

== See also ==
- Solar power in Nevada
- Wind power in the United States
- Renewable energy in the United States
