= Spring Valley Wind Farm =

Wind farm in Nevada, USA

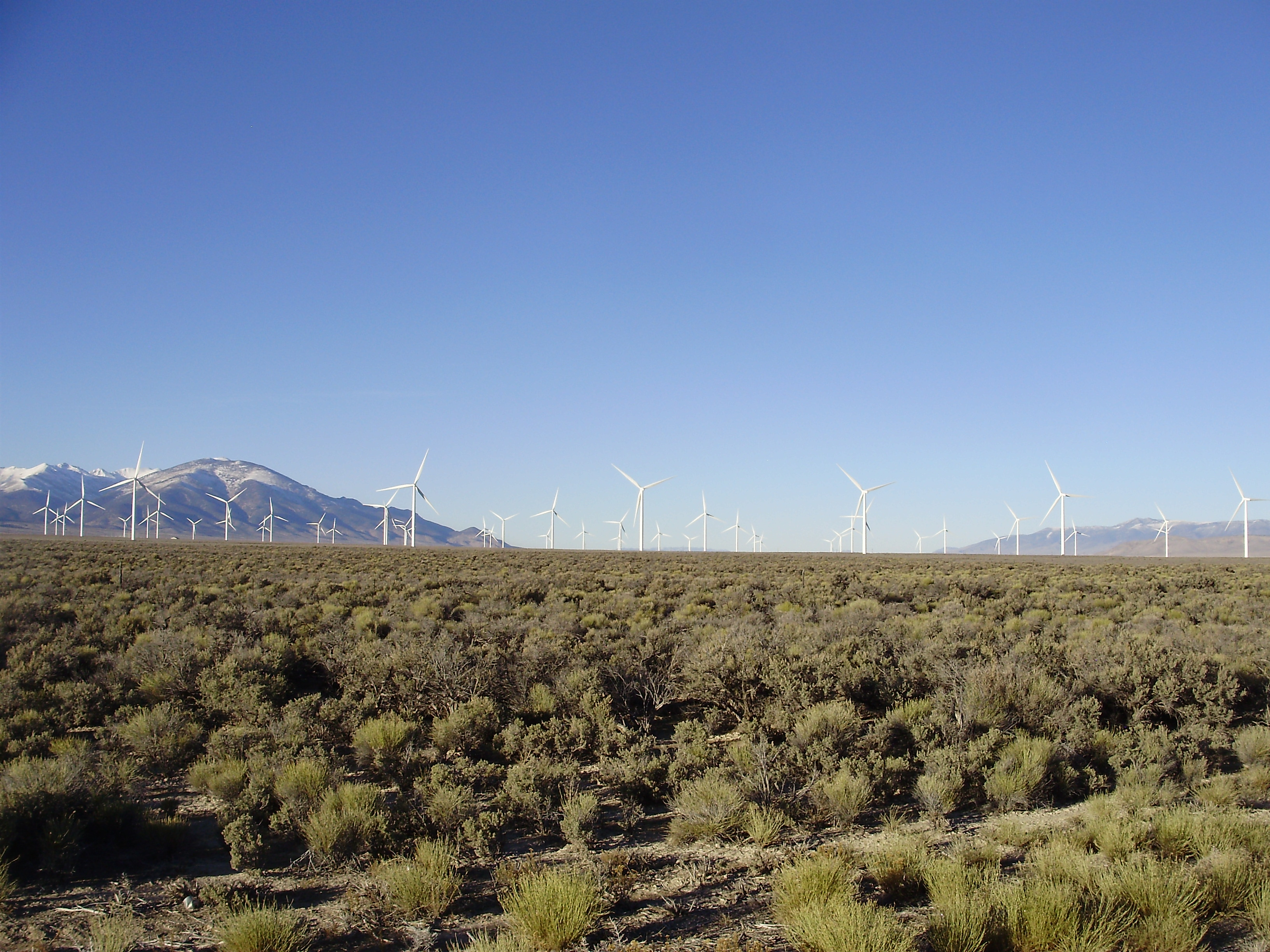
- The wind farm in January 2015
- Official name: Spring Valley Wind
- Country: United States
- Location: Spring Valley, White Pine County, Nevada
- Coordinates: 39°06′15″N 114°29′32″W
- Status: Operational
- Construction began: June 15, 2011 (site prep); March 2012 (install)
- Commission date: August 8, 2012
- Construction cost: $225 million
- Owner: Pattern Energy
- Operator: Pattern Energy

Wind farm
- Type: Onshore

Power generation
- Units operational: 66 turbines
- Make and model: Siemens SWT-2.3 MW
- Nameplate capacity: 151.8 MW
- Capacity factor: 23.5% (average 2013-2017)
- Annual net output: 313 GW·h

External links
- Website: patternenergy.com/learn/portfolio/spring-valley-wind
- Commons: Related media on Commons

Spring Valley Wind Farm is Nevada's first wind farm. The farm is owned and operated by Pattern Energy. The facility is located in Spring Valley, northwest of Great Basin National Park and approximately 30 miles (48 km) east of Ely, Nevada. The 151.8-megawatt plant uses 66 2.3-megawatt wind turbines and occupies 77 acres (31 ha) in the center of Spring Valley, which consists of 7,673 acres (3,105 ha).

The wind farm, in consideration since 2003, was officially proposed to the White Pine County Commission in February 2008, with plans to have the facility operational in two years. Delays occurred when the Bureau of Land Management (BLM) sought further information from the developer about the site. The BLM approved the project in October 2010, but a lawsuit was filed in January 2011, alleging that the BLM quickly approved the project without conducting a full environmental analysis. The lawsuit stated that the wind farm would endanger Mexican free-tailed bats and other airborne animals, and that the location for the proposed project violated American Indian culture as it was near the site of an Indian massacre that occurred during the Goshute War in 1863.

Site preparation work began on June 15, 2011, and discussions about settling the lawsuit began later that year. Wind turbines began arriving on the site in March 2012, and the lawsuit was settled later that month. The site began operations on August 8, 2012. The wind farm provides power to NV Energy, which is its sole customer as part of a 20-year agreement that was reached with Pattern Energy and approved in February 2010.

== Development history ==
As of January 2008, seven wind farms had been proposed for White Pine County, Nevada. On February 13, 2008, Babcock & Brown proposed plans to the White Pine County Commission for a wind farm to be built in Spring Valley, located approximately 30 miles (48 km) east of Ely, and northwest of Great Basin National Park. The company planned to have the wind farm operational in two years. The project had been in consideration since 2003.

On February 11, 2009, the company stated that it still planned to build the $250 million project beginning in 2010, despite the financial collapse of Babcock & Brown. Construction was projected to begin between April and December 2010, with completion at the end of the year. Delays occurred when the company was required to gather further information that was sought by the Bureau of Land Management (BLM).

By October 2009, Houston-based Pattern Energy had become involved with the proposed wind farm, and the BLM was finalizing the company's development plans for the project. The company hoped to begin construction in late summer or early fall 2010, with possible completion by the second quarter of 2011. A special-use permit and variance were granted to Pattern Energy in January 2010. On February 9, 2010, after receiving approval, Pattern Energy announced a 20-year agreement with NV Energy, which would purchase power generated from the wind farm. Much of the power produced by the wind farm would benefit customers of NV Energy in the Las Vegas Valley.

== Environmental impacts and litigation ==
By August 2010, biologists had become concerned about the safety of up to three million migrating Mexican free-tailed bats that annually inhabit the nearby Rose Cave, located approximately 5 miles (8 km) away. Biologists were concerned that the bats could fly into the wind turbines, and that they may suffer barotrauma from coming too close to a turbine, both of which would lead to death. George Hardie, the project manager for the wind farm, said about the land: "From the standpoint of raptor migratory corridors, it looked like the most environmentally benign site in Nevada." According to Hardie, studies of bat movements showed that most of the animals exiting the cave flew south, away from the site of the proposed wind farm. Project planners expected that for each year, fewer than 203 birds and 193 bats would die from turbine encounters.

After the biologists conducted research, the company planned to install three ground radar stations on the wind farm's east side; this was described by Hardie as a "backstop mitigation measure to where we could shut down the turbines in less than a minute and that way prevent or eliminate bat fatalities." The company also planned to install either infrared sensors or a motion detector at the cave's entrance, which would alert operators of the wind farm whenever a large plume of bats exited.

The BLM approved the project on October 15, 2010. In January 2011, a 36-page federal lawsuit was filed, stating that the BLM violated federal environmental and American Indian cultural laws by approving the project. The lawsuit claimed that the BLM quickly approved the project despite "very significant and unknown environmental and cultural impacts", stating, "BLM refused to conduct the full environmental analysis required by the National Environmental Policy Act. Instead, under pressure from high-level BLM officials and the industry proponent, BLM rushed through a short-cut analysis in order to meet arbitrary funding deadlines desired by the industry."

The complaint noted that several different animal species could be affected by the project, including the Mexican free-tail bats, greater sage-grouse and raptors. The site for the proposed wind farm was also located near Bahsahwahbee, the sacred Western Shoshone swamp cedar site where Indians were massacred in 1859, 1863, and 1897, during the Goshute War. The lawsuit was filed by attorneys for the Center for Biological Diversity, the Confederated Tribes of the Goshute Reservation, the Duckwater Shoshone Tribe, the Ely Shoshone Tribe, and the Western Watershed Project.

The lawsuit sought to prevent the BLM from allowing the wind farm project to proceed with ground-clearing, site preparation, and construction of the wind turbines "until such time as BLM has fully complied with law." Additionally, the lawsuit requested that the BLM negate its approval of the project. The BLM declined to comment on the lawsuit, while Hardie said that "if the Spring Valley project is not environmentally acceptable, then no project in Nevada will ever be acceptable."

Hardie further stated that Pattern Energy and the BLM worked "extremely hard to make the Spring Valley wind project as environmentally benign as possible," saying that it "has put in place the most extensive and forward looking mitigation and adaptive management plan ever devised for any wind energy project in the United States to minimize the impact to wildlife and the environment. In fact, our mitigation and adaptive management plans for bats, sage grouse and other avian species were all designed with the full input and ultimate concurrence of both the Nevada Department of Wildlife and the U.S. Fish and Wildlife Service." According to the lawsuit, the project was approved despite concerns from the National Park Service, and biologists from the US Fish and Wildlife Service and the Nevada Department of Wildlife.

=== Construction and lawsuit settlement ===
Work on the site began on June 15, 2011, to prepare it for construction of the wind turbines. More than 150 jobs were expected to be created during the construction phase, while 10 permanent jobs would be created upon completion of the project. Discussions about a settlement of the lawsuit began later in 2011, after a federal judge declined to have work at the site stopped to allow for further impact studies of the bats and sage grouse.

Wind turbines began arriving at the site on March 1, 2012, and the lawsuit was settled later that month. As part of the settlement, Pattern Energy agreed to expand the program used to track bat and bird deaths caused by the project. The company also agreed to pay $50,000 for a study of Rose Cave. Initially, the wind farm was only to serve NV Energy customers in northern Nevada. The eventual completion of a transmission line, under construction as of April 2012, would bring power from the wind farm to customers in the Las Vegas Valley.

=== Operations and animal fatalities ===
The wind farm was completed at a cost of $225 million, and began operations on August 8, 2012. It was the first wind farm to be built in Nevada, and the first to be built on federal land in the United States. The wind farm featured 66 turbines, each approximately 400 feet (120 m) tall and located in the center of Spring Valley. The wind farm produces 152 megawatts of electricity, enough to power 40,000 homes. As part of the earlier agreement, NV Energy was to be the wind farm's sole customer for 20 years. The project created 13 permanent jobs, and was expected to generate $1 million in taxes each year for the county and the state. It was Pattern Energy's fourth operating wind project in North America.

In December 2012, the wind farm was named Wind Project of the Year at an international power-sector conference. In February 2013, a golden eagle was killed at the wind farm and subsequently given to federal authorities, as required by law. However, the wind farm still faced the possibility of a $200,000 fine as it did not have an incidental take permit, which would allow for accidental deaths of golden and bald eagles. The U.S. Fish and Wildlife Service began investigating the death. No penalties were filed against Pattern Energy.

Up to September 2014, bat deaths at the wind farm had decreased 75 percent in comparison to the same time period in 2013; 23 bat deaths were recorded up to that point, compared to 103 in the earlier time frame. A total of 533 bats were ultimately killed in 2013, three times the amount allowed by federal regulators. The company then increased the speed required to spin the turbines from seven to eleven miles per hour (11 to 18 km/h), resulting in the decreased bat fatalities. A second gold eagle died at the wind farm in February 2015.

== Electricity production ==
Spring Valley Wind Electricity Generation (MW·h)
Year	Total Annual MW·h
2012	128,788
2013	250,549
2014	300,134
2015	309,724
2016	343,865
2017	361,364
Average (years 2013–2017)	313,127

== See also ==
- Wind power in Nevada
- List of wind farms in the United States
