= Northwestern Band of the Shoshone Nation =

Federally recognized Shoshone tribe in Box Elder County, Utah, United States

Total population
- 431 enrolled members

Regions with significant populations
- United States(Utah)

Languages
- Shoshoni language, English

Religion
- Native American Church, Mormonism,

Related ethnic groups
- other Western Shoshone peoples, Ute people

Northwestern Band of the Shoshone Nation
- Website: nwbshoshone.com

The Northwestern Band of the Shoshone Nation (Shoshoni: So-so-goi) is a federally recognized tribe of Shoshone people, located in Box Elder County, Utah. They are also known as the Northwestern Band of Shoshoni Indians.

== Current land holdings ==
Location of the land holdings of the Band

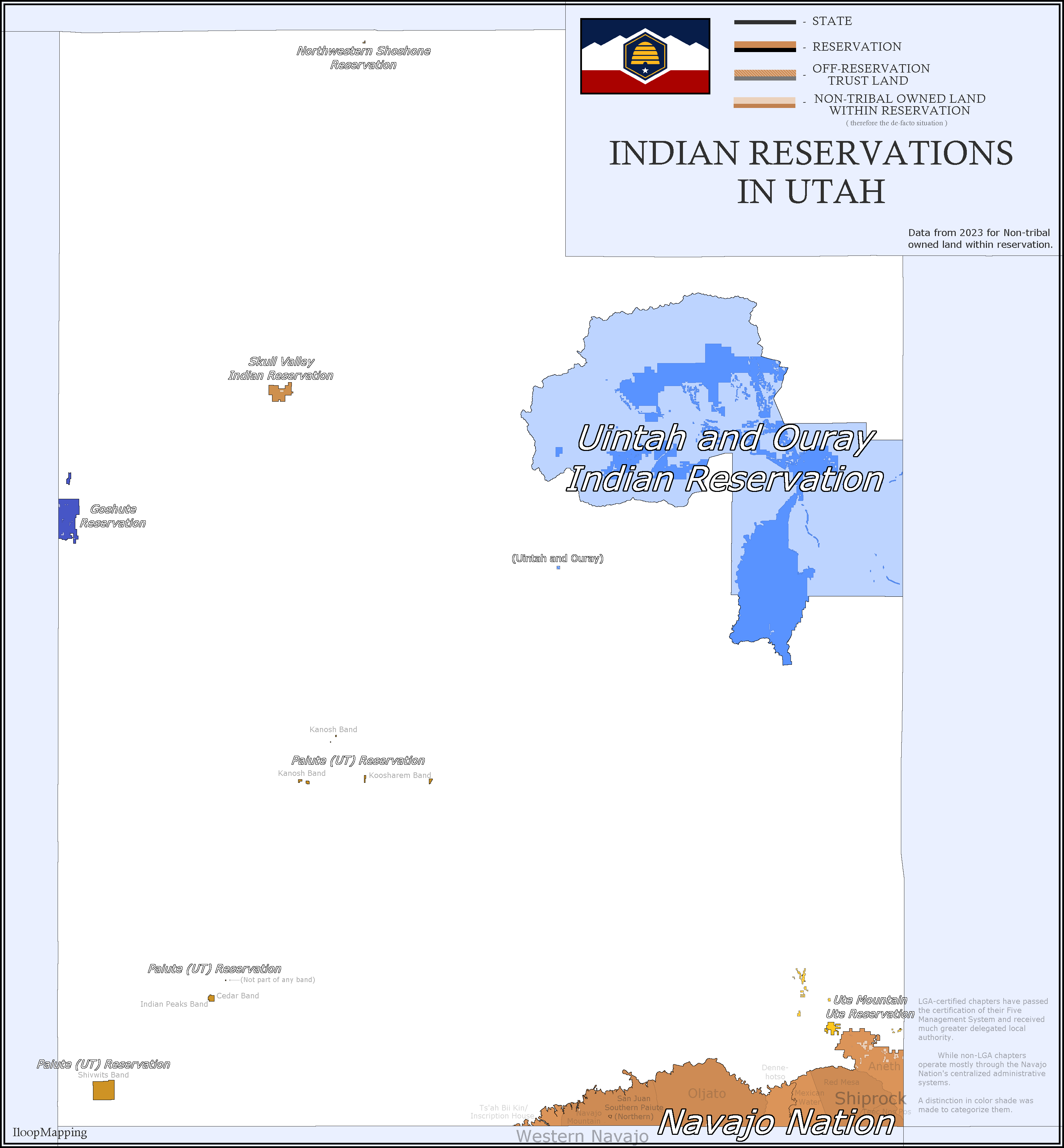
Map of the Northwestern Shoshone Reservation and neighboring reservations (In pale yellow).

The tribe owns a piece of land near the Utah-Idaho border, which is 189 acres (76 ha). It is located near Washakie, Utah. According to Darren Parry, the Northwestern Band does not consider this land a reservation as they own the land and are self-sustaining, not relying on federal sponsorship.

== Government ==
The tribe's headquarters is in Brigham City, Utah, but they also have a tribal office in Pocatello, Idaho. The tribe is governed by a democratically elected, seven-member tribal council. The current administration is as follows:

- Chairman: Dennis Alex
- Vice-Chairman, Natural Resources Officer: Bradley Parry
- Secretary: Alicia Martinez
- Treasurer, Kasey Hubbard
- Council Member, EPA + Roads Pocatello Office Manager : Jason S. Walker
- Council Member: Shane Warner
- Council Member, Cale Worley

Shane Warner was formerly Treasurer.

The Northwestern Band of Shoshone ratified their constitution on August in 1987.

== Language ==
Traditionally, the Northwestern Band of Shoshone Tribe speaks the Northern Shoshoni dialect of the Shoshoni language, which is written in the Latin script.

== Notable people with Northwestern Band of the Shoshone Nation ancestry ==
Mae Timbimboo Parry, storyteller, activist
