= Yomba Shoshone Tribe of the Yomba Reservation =

Tribe of Western Shoshone Indians in Nevada, U.S.

Coordinates: 38.872°N 117.491°W

Total population
- 192 (1992)

Regions with significant populations
- United States ( Nevada)

Languages
- English

Religion
- traditional tribal religion

Related ethnic groups
- other Western Shoshone tribes

The Yomba Shoshone Tribe of the Yomba Reservation is a federally recognized tribe of Western Shoshone Indians in central Nevada.

== Government ==
The Yomba Shoshone Tribe is headquartered in Austin, Nevada. The tribe is governed by a democratically elected, six-person tribal council under its constitution. The 2026 Yomba Shoshone Tribal Government includes: Chairman Christopher Dyer, Vice-Chairman Maurice Frank-Churchill, Councilmember Secretary Kenneth Smith, Councilmember Eugene Birchim, Councilmember Randy Brady, and Councilmember Theresa Birchim. Tribal enrollment as a member requires a one-quarter degree Shoshone blood quantum according to the Constitution of the tribe.

== Reservation ==
Location of the Yomba Reservation in Nevada

The Yomba Reservation resides 4,718.46 acres (19.0949 km^{2}) in central Nye County, Nevada. The reservation is divided into two districts: the Upper, including Doyle Ranch, and Lower, including Bowler Ranch.

== History ==
The Yomba band ratified their constitution on 20 December 1939, establishing an elected representative government and becoming federally recognized under the 1934 Indian Reorganization Act. They are one of several bands of Western Shoshone peoples.

== Bibliography ==
- Pritzker, Barry M. A Native American Encyclopedia: History, Culture, and Peoples. Oxford: Oxford University Press, 2000. ISBN 978-0-19-513877-1.
