= Treaty of Ruby Valley (1863) =

1863 treaty between the United States and Western Shoshone

The Treaty of Ruby Valley was a treaty signed with the Western Shoshone in 1863, giving certain rights to the United States in the Nevada Territory. The Western Shoshone did not cede land under this treaty but agreed to allow the U.S. the "right to traverse the area, maintain existing telegraph and stage lines, construct one railroad and engage in specified economic activities. The agreement allows the U.S. president to designate reservations, but does not tie this to land cessions."

As of 2006, most of the Western Shoshone tribal councils had refused to settle for a payment of $145 million to transfer 25 million acres (101,000 km^{2}) of their traditional territory to the United States; this settlement was authorized by Congress in 2004. They feared that accepting payment would be considered to extinguish their land claims.

== Treaty ==
In the early 1860s, some of the Western Shoshone people were conducting raids against European American settlers who were traveling along the Humboldt River and the Overland Trail. The Federal government established Fort Ruby to provide security for the settlers against the Indians. In May 1863, U.S. Army cavalry led by Captain S. P. Smith from Fort Ruby massacred 52 Goshute Indians at Bahsahwahbee in Spring Valley, Nevada, an event known as the Swamp Cedars Massacre of 1863.

The U.S. started negotiating treaties with the Shoshone and other peoples of the Great Basin to protect gold sources in the West in order and prosecute the American Civil War. On 1 October 1863, Governor James W. Nye of the Nevada Territory and Governor James Duane Doty of the Utah Territory signed the Treaty of Ruby Valley. Twelve chiefs signed for the "Western Bands of the Shoshonee Nation of Indians." All but one made a mark in place of a signature. The signing of the document was witnessed by J. B. Moore, a lieutenant colonel in the Third Infantry California Volunteers; Jacob T. Lockhart, the Indian agent in the Nevada Territory; and Henry Butterfield, the interpreter. White men present at the treaty of 1863 were the first to refer to these several native bands as "Western Shoshone." The bands all spoke the Shoshone language, also known as Shoshoni, and were culturally similar yet operated independently.

The signatories agreed to cease hostilities. The chiefs would allow free passage for European Americans along the routes through Shoshone country, establish U.S. military posts and rest stations for travelers and for mail and telegraph companies, continue the operation of telegraph and stage lines, and construct a railway passing through their country from the Plains to the Pacific Ocean. They would also allow for prospecting for gold, silver, or other minerals; mining of any deposits found; establishing mining and agricultural settlements and ranches; constructing mills; and logging timber. When the President of the United States "deem[ed] it expedient for them to abandon the roaming life," they agreed to become herdsmen or agriculturalists on reservations assigned to them. In exchange, the Shoshone would receive twenty annual payments worth $5,000 each cattle and other goods.

The treaty did not state that the Shoshone were to cede their lands. In a continuing dispute with the federal government over the use and management of much of these lands under various federal agencies, the tribes in the 20th century took their land claims to the Indian Claims Commission (ICC) from the ICC's establishment in 1946 until its dissolution in 1978. As the treaty had not required the Western Shoshone to cede defined lands, their claims were complex. After the Claims Commission was dissolved, the Western Shoshone took their outstanding issues to federal courts.

The Western Shoshone have been engaged in legal battles with the federal government over rights to their land since the erroneous filing of a claim in 1951 for land presumed to have been taken. Most western states comprising the Great Basin were created by federal statutes that referenced that "no part of Indian country will be included into the boundaries or jurisdiction of any state or territory ...without the consent of the Indians."

During the American Civil War, the Union needed gold from the West in order to finance its prosecution of the war against the Confederacy. The U.S. entered into the Doty treaties with the Shoshone to gain access and free passage to their extensive territory. In 1863, the U.S. signed the Treaty of Ruby Valley with the 12 Western Bands of the Shoshone Nation (18 Statute 689–692) and identified the boundaries of their 40,000 sq. mi. territory. The Union relied on this treaty to demonstrate to European governments and banks backing the Union that it could provide the gold needed for the war, announcing that "the treaty is in full force and effect."

The Western Shoshone did not consent to the inclusion of their property into the boundaries or jurisdiction of any US state or territory. The Western Shoshone possess all the interests which the United States sought to purchase by the treaty for $5,000 per year for 20 years. The United States only made the first payment to the Shoshone but exercised its rights of access, passage, and taking of territory for building railroads and later for federal agency management by such agencies as the Bureau of Land Management, which manages federal public lands.

Because the tribe still legally controls the territory, the United States Department of Energy was unable to prove ownership of land for construction of the proposed Yucca Mountain nuclear waste repository. It withdrew its license application for the facility. In 1979, Congress appropriated $26 million to settle the land claims, but the tribes refused payment. They demanded that the U.S. adhere to the 1863 treaty and stop trespassing on their lands.

In 1985, the U.S. Supreme Court ruled in US v. Dann, a legal case brought by Western Shoshone sisters Carrie and Mary Dann. The Danns were challenging the federal agency's efforts to regulate their grazing of livestock on traditional lands. The Court decided that the appropriation of funds by Congress and the acceptance of this action by the Secretary of the Interior constitutes "payment" and puts into effect Section 70 U of the Indian Claims Commission Act, which forever bars further claims. It ruled that Western Shoshone title is 'presumed to be extinguished.'

However, the tribes of the Western Shoshone refused the settlement and left the money with the government. In another effort to close a 1951 Indian Claims Commission 326-k case, which was transferred to federal court, Congress passed the Western Shoshone Claims Distribution Act of 2004, appropriating and authorizing payment of $160 million to the Great Basin tribe for the perceived acquisition of 39,000 square miles (100,000 km2). The Western Shoshone had filed the original 326-k claim for payment of $1.05 per acre for 26 million acres, which the government never paid. Still, they said that it did not constitute a transfer of rights, title, and interest, since the Treaty of Ruby Valley is controlling.

The Western Shoshone have conducted protests related to a number of issues as they try to protect their territory. They have called for an end to nuclear testing within their country. They have also filed for court injunctions against the gold mining that would result in the dewatering of Mount Tenabo, Nevada. The Western Shoshone have attempted to assert full sovereignty against the US to demonstrate that the U.S. does not have jurisdiction within their territory.

== Attempts at settlement ==
The United States Congress attempted to settle the agreement in 1979, appropriating $26 million to purchase title to 24 million acres (97,000 km^{2}) of tribal lands. In 1985, the U.S. Supreme Court ruled that the settlement extinguished Shoshone claims to the land.

Chiefs Frank Temoke and Frank Brady adamantly refused the government payoff at Battle Mountain, Nevada on December 11, 1992. Temoke was sure that the Shoshone would lose their claim to the lands if they accepted the funds. He said, "I did not sign any agreement for money. The actions of the federal government are unconstitutional, immoral, genocide and against international law." Brady urged his people to refuse the settlement also, saying, "The people need land, not money." They both faced immense pressure from their own people to sell out because many of the Shoshone wanted the money. Brady said, "Some say we've lost the land already and that may be so, but we still have a fighting chance if we don't take the government payment." By 1998 the value of the settlement had increased to $100 million, and it continues to grow.

Congress passed the Western Shoshone Claims Distribution Act of 2004, which authorized payment of $145 million to the tribe for the transfer of 25 million acres (101,000 km^{2}) of their traditional territory to the United States. Seven of the nine tribal councils within the Western Shoshone Nation passed resolutions opposing the legislation and refusing settlement payment.

On March 10, 2006, the United Nations Committee on the Elimination of Racial Discrimination stated "credible information alleging that the Western Shoshone indigenous people are being denied their traditional rights to land." On January 17, 2006, the U.S. District Court for the District of Nevada dismissed a lawsuit filed by the Western Shoshone National Council against the United States, seeking to quiet title to lands whose boundaries were defined by the Treaty of Ruby Valley (See 415 F. Supp. 2d 1201).

== Representation in other media ==
- Broken Treaty at Battle Mountain (1975) is a documentary by Joel Freedman about the U.S. treatment of the Western Shoshone since the signing of the 1863 treaty. The documentary shows violations by the Bureau of Land Management and other agencies, which adversely affected the conditions of their traditional territory.
- To Protect Mother Earth (1989) is a documentary by Freedman and produced by Robert Redford that addressed the Shoshone tribe's efforts to protect its lands and rights, at a time when the US was trying to settle the land claims case.
- American Outrage (2008) is a documentary film that explored disputes over tribal land in litigation led by Mary Dann and Carrie Dann (two Western Shoshone sisters who challenged the U.S. government over issues of land use) and the United Nations' recognition of the Western Shoshone struggle. It was originally titled Our Land, Our Life before being recut. It was directed by George Gage and Beth Gage and written by Beth Gage.
- Land of the Brave is a documentary by Joel Freedman, produced in 2016 and narrated by Robert Redford. It is a sequel to the documentaries Broken Treaty at Battle Mountain and To Protect Mother Earth, continuing the coverage of the Western Shoshone and their land claims issues.

== Bibliography ==
- Chen, Michelle (April 27, 2007). "Western Shoshone Struggle Earns World Recognition". The New Standard.
- D'Azevedo, Warren L.; Sturtevant, William C. (1986-08-21). Handbook of North American Indians, Volume 11: Great Basin. Government Printing Office. p. 263. ISBN 978-0-16-004581-3.
- Ontko, Gale (1997). Thunder Over the Ochoco, Lightning Strikes Vol. III. Maverick Publications, Inc. Bend, Oregon.
- The Bulletin, Bend, Oregon, Associated Press Release, December 14, 1992.
- "United States Treaty with the Western Shoshoni, 1863". NativeWeb.

External links

- History and Photos of Fort Ruby
- Detailed History and Photos of Fort Ruby
- History of the Transcontinental Telegraph
- Photographs of the Northern Ruby Valley
