= Western Shoshone =

Grouping of Shoshone tribes in the Great Basin of the U.S.

Western Shoshone Newe
Regions with significant populations
- United States (Idaho,Utah, Nevada)

Languages
- Shoshone, English

Religion
- Native American Church, Sun Dance, traditional tribal religion, Christianity, Ghost Dance

Related ethnic groups
- other Shoshone people, Bannock

Neme / Newe "People"
- People: Neme; Newe
- Language: Neme Ta̲i̲kwappeh; Newe Ta̲i̲kwappe
- Country: Neme Segobia; Newe Segobia

Western Shoshone comprise several Shoshone tribes that are indigenous to the Great Basin and have lands identified in the Treaty of Ruby Valley 1863. They resided in Idaho, Nevada, California, and Utah. The tribes are very closely related culturally to the Paiute, Goshute, Bannock, Ute, and Timbisha tribes.

They speak the Western dialect of the Shoshone language. Other Shoshone-speaking groups include the Goshute (Utah-Nevada border), Northern Shoshone (southern Idaho), and Eastern Shoshone (western Wyoming).

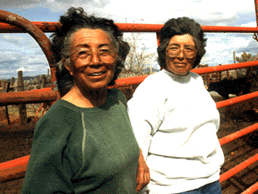
Sisters Mary Dann and Carrie Dann on their ranch in Crescent Valley, Nevada 1992

== Bands ==
Bands of Western Shoshone are named for their traditional geographical homelands and their primary food sources.

- Kuyatikka (Kuyudikka, Bitterroot Eaters), Halleck, Mary's River, Clover Valley, Smith Creek Valley, Nevada
- Mahaguadüka (Mentzelia Seed Eaters), Reese River, Ruby Valley, Nevada
- Painkwitikka (Penkwitikka, Fish Eaters), Cache Valley, Idaho and Utah
- Tipatikka (Tepattekka'a, Tetadeka, Pinenut Eaters, Bia Tevateka), northernmost band, northern Utah
- Tosawihin (Tosa·wihi, Dosawii, White Knife Shoshone), Battle Mountain, Nevada (perhaps variant name for the Tsogwiyuyugi)
- Tsaiduka (Tule Eaters), Railroad Valley, Nevada
- Tsogwiyuyugi, Elko County, Nevada
- Waitikka (Ricegrass Eaters), Ione Valley, Nevada
- Watatikka (Ryegrass Seed Eaters), Ruby Valley, Nevada
- Wiyimpihtikka (Buffalo Berry Eaters), Big Smoky Valley, Nevada:

== Tribes ==
Federally recognized Western Shoshone tribes include:

- Duckwater Shoshone Tribe of the Duckwater Reservation, Nevada
- Ely Shoshone Tribe of Nevada
- Fort McDermitt Paiute and Shoshone Tribes of the Fort McDermitt Indian Reservation, Nevada and Oregon
- Northwestern Band of the Shoshone Nation, Utah
- Paiute-Shoshone Tribe of the Fallon Reservation and Colony, Nevada
- Reno-Sparks Indian Colony, Nevada
- Shoshone-Paiute Tribes of the Duck Valley Reservation, Nevada
- Te-Moak Tribe of Western Shoshone Indians of Nevada

- Battle Mountain Band
- Elko Band
- South Fork Band
- Wells Band

- Yomba Shoshone Tribe of the Yomba Reservation, Nevada.

== Legal battles ==
The Western Shoshone have been engaged in legal battles with the federal government over rights to their land since the erroneous filing of a claim in 1951 for land presumed to have been taken. Most western states comprising the Great Basin were created by federal statutes that referenced that "no part of Indian country will be included into the boundaries or jurisdiction of any state or territory ...without the consent of the Indians".

However, during the American Civil War (1861–1865), the Union needed gold from the west to finance the prosecution of the war against the Confederacy. Therefore, the Doty treaties were entered into by the US with the Shoshone.

In 1863 the Treaty of Ruby Valley was entered into with the Western Bands of the Shoshone Nation (18 Statute 689–692) and identified the boundaries of their 40,000 mi^{2} (100,000 km^{2}) territory. The Western Shoshone did not consent to the inclusion of their property into the boundaries or jurisdiction of any state or territory. The Western Shoshone possess all the interests the United States sought to purchase by the treaty for $5,000 per year for 20 years. The treaty was also used by the Union to demonstrate to European governments and banks backing the Union that it could do what it said and provide the gold needed for the war. "the treaty is in full force and effect" The United States failed to make any, but the first payment.

In an effort to close a 1951 Indian Claims Commission 326-k case, the Western Shoshone Claims Distribution Act of 2004 established by the United States to give the perception that the Indians have been served justice, made payment of $160 million to the Great Basin tribe for the perceived acquisition of 39,000 mi^{2} (100,000 km^{2}). The 326-k claim was $1.05 per acre for 26,000 million acres but did not in fact constitute a transfer of rights, title and interest since the Treaty of Ruby Valley is controlling. These facts are the basis for the failure of the United States Department of Energy to prove ownership to the proposed Yucca Mountain nuclear waste repository and the withdrawal of the license application. In 1979 Congress appropriated $26 million to settle the land claims, but the tribes said they wanted the US to abide by the 1863 treaty and stop trespassing on their lands.

In 1985 the US Supreme Court ruled in the US v. Dann that the appropriation of funds by Congress and the acceptance by the Secretary of the Interior constitutes "payment" and effects Section 70 U of the ICC Act and forever bars further claims and Western Shoshone title is 'presumed to be extinguished', but the tribes have left the money with the government. As recently as 2004, Congress has attempted to force the purchase of Western Shoshone land but this has been opposed by the majority of tribal leaders. Disputes over tribal land and the international recognition by the United Nations of their struggle against the United States government is documented in the 2008 film American Outrage.

Western Shoshone have demonstrated related to a number of issues as they try to protect their property; they have called for an end to nuclear testing within their country as well as filing injunctions against gold mining that would result in dewatering of Mount Tenabo, Nevada.

== Passports ==
The Western Shoshone have issued their own passports since 1992. In 2010, when Timbisha Shoshone Chairman Joe Kennedy and Western Shoshone elder Carrie Dann went to the World Peoples Conference on Climate Change and the Rights of Mother Earth in Cochabamba, Bolivia, Chairman Kennedy traveled on his Western Shoshone passport. For further information on passport issues, see the Iroquois passport.

== Notable Western Shoshone ==
- Ned Blackhawk (Te-Moak), historian and professor at Yale
- Carrie Dann, elder and lands right activist
- Mary Dann, elder and land rights activist
- Corbin Harney, elder and anti-nuclear weapon activist
- Frank Temoke, Last chief to the Te-Moke

== See also ==
- Spring Valley Massacre of 1859
- Western Shoshone Claims Distribution Act of 2004
