= Processed World =

Anarchist magazine

- Covers of several issues
- Categories: Anarchist
- Frequency: Quarterly
- Total circulation: 4,000
- Founder: Chris Carlsson
- First issue: April 1981; 45 years ago
- Final issue Number: 2005; 32
- Country: United States
- Based in: San Francisco, U.S.
- ISSN: 0735-9381

Processed World was an anti-capitalist, anti-authoritarian magazine focused on the oppressions and absurdities of office work, which, at the time the magazine began, was becoming automated. The magazine was founded by Chris Carlsson, Caitlin Manning, and Adam Cornford in 1981. No new issues have been produced since 2005.

The print magazine was widely distributed to and read by office workers in Downtown San Francisco during the years the print magazine was published from 1981 to 1994.

== Publication history ==
Processed World began publication in April 1981 and was printed on an irregular basis, approximately quarterly to semi-annually until Winter 1992. There were 32 published printed issues.

There have subsequently been three more issues published on the Internet — number 33 in 1995, and two more issues, one in 2000 and one in 2005. These last two issues are numbered 2.001 and 2.005. All of the issues of the magazine are now available online.

== Themes ==
The magazine is about the absurdity and futility of modern employment practices in which a large number of college-educated people are often forced to seek temporary work with no employee benefits. The magazine details the subversive attitudes and sense of humor required for workers to be able to get through the day when forced to perform dull, degrading and boring work as wage slaves doing modern office work such as working as a computer programmer, word processor, call center operator, data entry operator, telemarketer or file clerk.

== Contributors ==
Writers that have had work published by the magazine include founder Carlsson, Manning, Chris Winks, Denis Hayes, Greg Williamson, Jim Swanson, Fred Rinne, Adam Cornford, John Norton, Jesse Drew, and Donna Kossy and many more. The magazine featured art and cartoons by artists such as Tom Tomorrow, Melinda Gebbie, Ted Rall, Jay Kinney, Freddie Baer, and Paul Mavrides.

Many of the magazine's contributors, such as Dan Perkins, e.g. "Tom Tomorrow," adopted pseudonyms to avoid retribution from potential employers.

== See also ==
- Anarchism
- Temporary work
- New Escapologist
