= Bob Harris (writer) =

American writer

- Born: October 15, 1963 (age 63)
- Occupation: Writer
- Known for: Numerable game show appearances, books, and radio commentary

Bob Harris (born October 15, 1963) is an American radio commentator, writer, comedian, and former Jeopardy! champion.

== Early career ==
Early in his career, Harris was a stand-up comedian who appeared in numerous comedy clubs, and he has spoken at over 200 colleges.

Harris has written for the TV shows Bones and CSI: Crime Scene Investigation, appeared frequently as a debunker of urban legends on the TLC Network program Mostly True Stories: Urban Legends Revealed, and provided voiceover work on an episode of Buffy the Vampire Slayer and throughout the This Modern World animated web series and the Torchwood web series Web of Lies. In addition, Harris has contributed to several comic book projects published by Dark Horse Comics, narrated an audiobook on Kosovo by Noam Chomsky, and contributed to National Lampoon, the Chicago Tribune, Paul Krassner's magazine The Realist, and numerous other publications.

From 1998 to 2002, his daily political commentaries aired on an average of 75 radio stations across the U.S., winning awards from the Los Angeles Press Club and the Associated Press. He was also the morning drive-time host on the Working Assets attempt at explicitly liberal talk radio, RadioForChange.com, and wrote online political columns for Mother Jones magazine.

== Game show appearances ==
His game show appearances include reaching the semi-finals of the Jeopardy! Million Dollar Masters tournament in 2002, participation in a million-dollar-winning team on Greed in 2000 (winning $200,000 for himself), and a successful $250,000 phone-a-friend answer for a contestant on Who Wants to Be a Millionaire. Harris also participated in the Jeopardy! Ultimate Tournament of Champions in 2005 and the Jeopardy! Battle of the Decades tournament in 2014.

In 2005, Harris was the officiant of the "Jeopardy! Wedding", in which Harris briefly assumed Alex Trebek's podium and presided over the real-life wedding of a former opponent and 1998 Tournament of Champions winner Dan Melia and his fiancé Dara Hellman. Alex Trebek himself was the official legal witness.

In 2012, Harris served as co-host of the History Channel's National History Bee for middle school students.

In 2014, Harris later participated in the Jeopardy! Battle of the Decades. He finished in third place behind Shane Whitlock and Robin Carroll.

== Books ==
In 1999, Common Courage Press published his first book, "Steal This Book and Get Life Without Parole," a collection of previously published columns, including "Thumbs of Steel," an essay Harris originally published in The Realist about his first appearances on Jeopardy!.

Harris would later expand this column into his second book, Prisoner of Trebekistan: A Decade in Jeopardy!, published by Crown Publishing Group in 2006, detailing 10 years of tournament successes and failures. This book itself became a clue on Jeopardy! in 2009 and on Who Wants to Be a Millionaire in 2011.

His third book, a tongue-in-cheek guide to world conflicts, Who Hates Whom: Well-Armed Fanatics, Intractable Conflicts, and Various Things Blowing Up-A Woefully Incomplete Guide (Crown Publishing Group), was published September 25, 2007.

Harris's fourth book, The International Bank of Bob: Connecting Our Worlds One $25 Kiva Loan at a Time, for Bloomsbury Publishing, was released on March 5, 2013. In 2008, Harris was sent around the world by ForbesTraveler.com editor Jeff Koyen to review luxury hotels. On returning home, Harris used the proceeds from his luxury assignments to fund thousands of small loans in developing nations, mostly through the microfinance organization Kiva. He then spent much of the next several years traveling to meet clients in the field and see the results first-hand. In the wake of publication, more than 2,400 readers and supporters have joined a Kiva lending team called Friends of Bob Harris, making approximately 250,000 loans totaling more than $10.5 million to help fund small businesses in over 100 countries (as of February, 2022).
