= Western Shoshone Claims Distribution Act of 2004 =

The Western Shoshone Claims Distribution Act of 2004 established the legal framework for the distribution of the "Western Shoshone Judgement Funds" stemming from docket 326-K before the Indian Claims Commission. It further establishes an educational trust fund, the "Western Shoshone Educational Trust Fund" comprising the "Western Shoshone Joint Judgement Funds", appropriated in satisfaction of dockets 326-A-1 and 326-A-3 before the United States Court of Claims.

== Western Shoshone Judgement Funds ==
100% of the Western Shoshone Judgement Funds are designated by the act to be distributed to eligible Western Shoshone members in equal per-capita shares. The progress of the distribution of these funds can be found at US Department of Interior: Indian Affairs website.

According to the testimony of Neal A. McCaleb, then Assistant Secretary for Indian Affairs at the Department of Interior, the judgement funds stem from a 1951 claim by the Te-Mock Bands of Western Shoshone that was concluded in 1979 in Docket 326-K before the Indian Claims Commission. The award was in the amount of $26.1 million. Funds were appropriated on December 19, 1978, to cover this amount. At the time of McCaleb's testimony, the fund contained some $137 million.

== Western Shoshone Educational Trust ==
The Western Shoshone Educational Trust is charged with distributing the interest from the trust to Western Shoshone members in the form of grants and other educational assistance. The administrative committee comprises seven members; one each from the Te-Moak, Duckwater, Yomba, Ely tribes, one from the Fallon Band of Western Shoshone, one from the Committee of the Duck Valley Reservation, and one representing the general public. The Western Shoshone committee members are each appointed by their various groups, while the member representing the public is appointed by the Secretary of the Interior.

McCaleb's statement identifies the original source and amount of the principal for the trust as one award (Docket 326-A-1) in the amount of approximately $823,000, appropriated by Congress in 1992; and a second in the amount of $29,000 (Docket 326-A-3) appropriated by Congress in 1995. At the time of his testimony, the principal fund of the trust contained some $754 thousand, and the interest fund contained approximately $592 thousand.

== See also ==
- Treaty of Ruby Valley 1863
