= The Andorra Hustle =

2020 documentary film

- Film poster
- Directed by: Eric Merola
- Written by: Eric Merola
- Produced by: Eric Merola
- Release date: August 27, 2020 (Amazon Prime)
- Running time: 113 minutes
- Country: USA
- Languages: English; Catalan; Spanish

The Andorra Hustle is a 2020 documentary film about the war of the Kingdom of Spain against the Catalan independence movement. The documentary was produced between March 2019 and August 2020 and premiered on August 27, 2020, via the Amazon Prime platform.

== Reception ==
On Rotten Tomatoes, the film holds an approval rating of 86% based on 7 reviews, with an average rating of 7.20/10.

== See also ==
- Operation Catalonia
