= American Outrage =

- Directed by: Beth Gage and George Gage
- Based on: Dispute of Shoshone tribe members and U.S. federal government
- Starring: Mary Dann and Carrie Dann
- Narrated by: Mary Steenburgen
- Release date: 2008
- Country: USA

American Outrage is a 2008 documentary directed by Beth Gage and George Gage. The film follows Shoshone tribe members Mary Dann and Carrie Dann in their dispute with the U.S. federal government over use of the Western Shoshone territory.

The film won Best Environmental Film at the Boulder International Film Festival in 2008.
