= Washakie, Utah =

- Ghost town
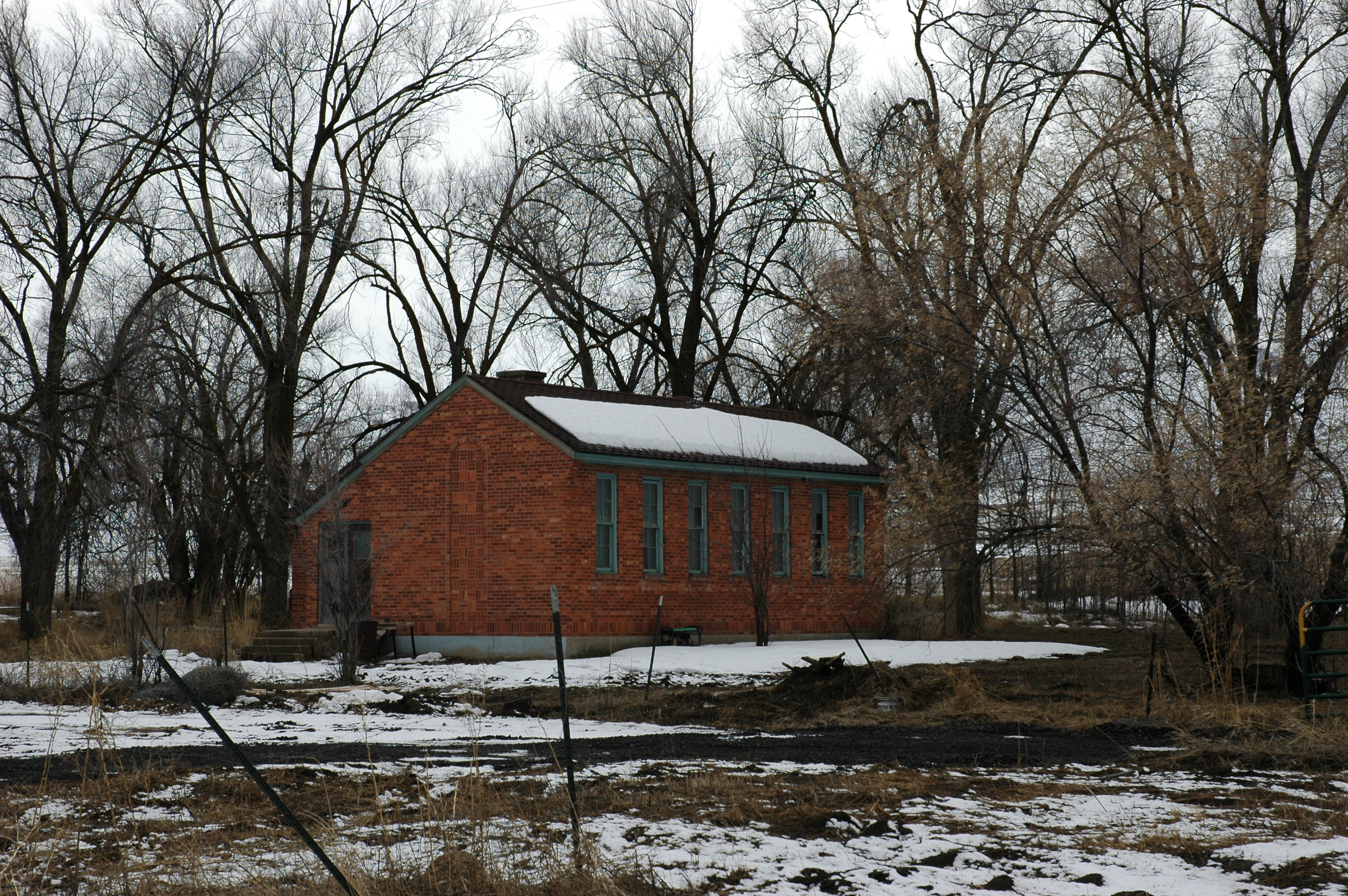
- LDS chapel located at Washakie

- Location within Utah Location within the United States
- Coordinates: 41°56′38″N 112°13′1″W
- Country: United States
- State: Utah
- County: Box Elder
- Established: 1880
- Abandoned: 1970s
- Named after: Washakie
- Elevation: 4,380 ft (1,340 m)
- Time zone: UTC-7 (Mountain (MST))
  - Summer (DST): UTC-6 (MDT)
- 84331: ZIP Code
- Area code: 435
- GNIS feature ID: 1447016

Washakie is a ghost town in far northern Box Elder County, Utah, United States. Lying some 3 miles (4.8 km) southeast of Portage, it was established in 1880 by The Church of Jesus Christ of Latter-day Saints (LDS Church) for the settlement of the Northwestern Shoshone. The Washakie Indian Farm was home to the main body of this Native American band through most of the 20th century. By the mid-1970s, Washakie's residents were gone and the property sold to a private ranching operation. Today the tribal reservation consists of a small tract containing the Washakie cemetery, and the tribe is seeking to acquire more of the surrounding land. The old LDS chapel in Washakie is now on the National Register of Historic Places.

== Geography ==
The Washakie site is located in the southern part of the narrow Malad Valley, near the Idaho border and is approximately 35 miles (56 km) north of Brigham City. To the east lie the Malad River, Interstate 15, and the Clarkston Mountains section of Caribou National Forest. To the west are the desolate West Hills. Just to the north sits the small town of Portage, and to the south is the Nucor steel bar mill, west of Plymouth.

== History ==
The Bear River Massacre of 1863 left only some 1250 Northwestern Shoshone alive. After the 1867 establishment of Fort Hall Indian Reservation in Idaho, most moved to the reservation. Two small bands led by the chiefs Sanpitch and Sagwitch stayed in northern Utah. After a few years of attempting to continue their traditional nomadic lifeways, Sagwitch's people converted to Mormonism in 1873 and expressed a desire to learn sedentary agriculture. In 1874, George Washington Hill, the missionary who had baptized the Northwestern Shoshone, started a farm for them near Franklin, Idaho. At the end of the year, LDS Church leaders decided to close this farm and find a better location the next year.

Over the next five years, two more Indian farms were established in Utah on the Bear River, first on the outskirts of Bear River City, then at a place called Lemuel's Garden, in the area of present-day Collinston. Both farms made progress, but water was often insufficient for irrigation, and the missionaries assigned to help Hill train the new farmers were frequently absent. Harvests could not support the farm residents, let alone the frequent visitors from Fort Hall. Each winter the missionaries would return to their families, and most of the Shoshone would return to the Promontory Mountains and their other traditional winter grounds in search of food.

In 1880, leaders of the LDS Church purchased a 1,700-acre (690 ha) farm south of Portage from the Brigham City Cooperative, along with the unfinished Samaria Canal. The canal was to supply irrigation water from Samaria Lake in Idaho, since the Malad River was too alkaline for watering crops. The church began encouraging the Shoshone to move to the new location, which was named after Chief Washakie.

From 1903 to 1929 Washakie fielded a baseball team which competed with white teams in northern Utah and southern Idaho, and received considerable local attention from both white and Indian press outlets.

== See also ==
- List of ghost towns in Utah
