= List of Indian massacres in North America =

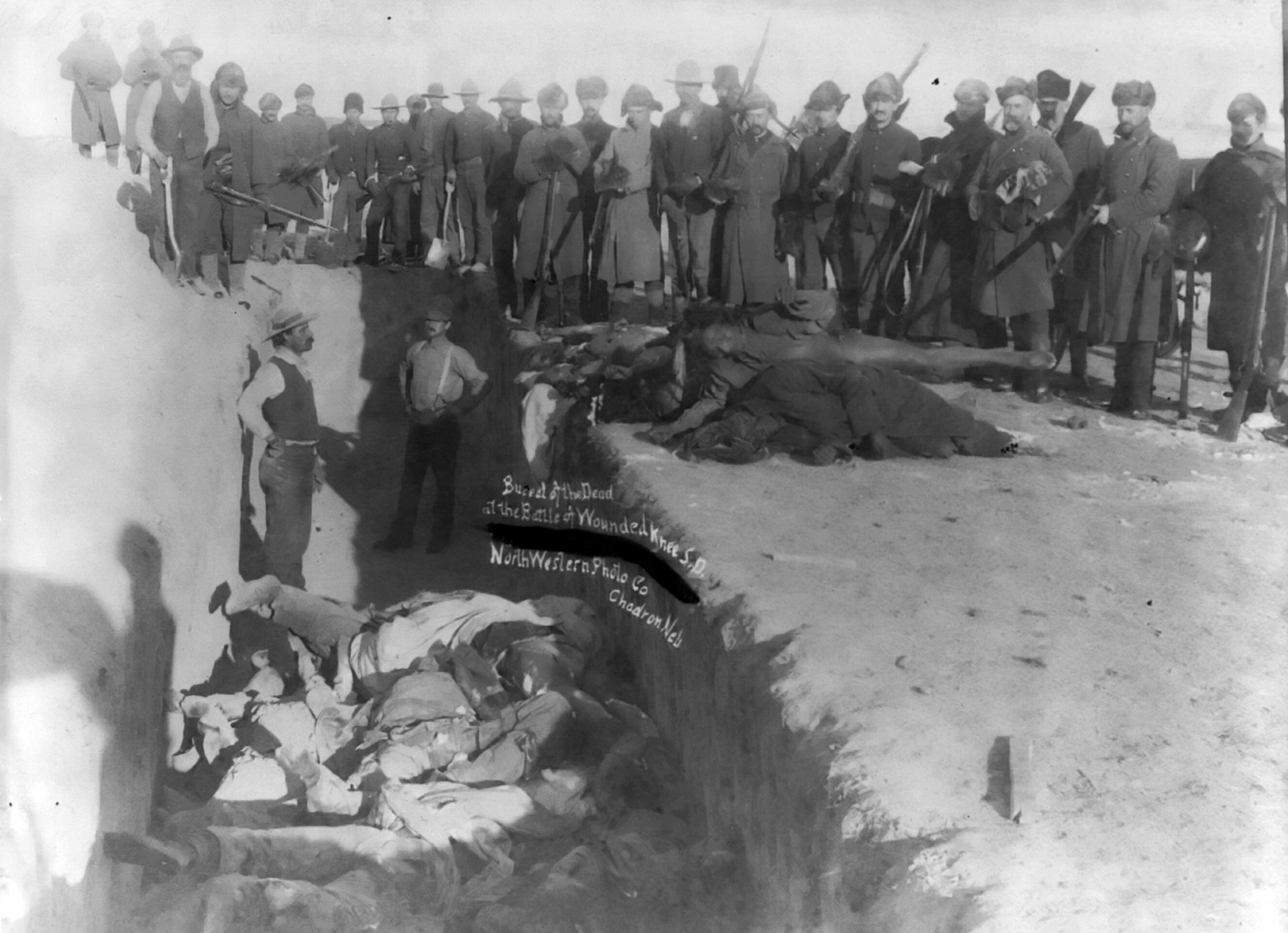
- Mass grave of Lakota dead — after the 1890 Wounded Knee Massacre.

An Indian massacre is any incident in which a significant number of Indigenous peoples of the Americas, as a group, killed or were killed outside the confines of mutual combat in war.

== Overview ==
Indian massacre is a phrase whose use and definition has evolved and expanded over time. European colonists initially used the phrase to describe attacks by indigenous Americans which resulted in mass colonial casualties. While similar attacks by colonists on Indian villages were called raids or battles, successful Indian attacks on white settlements or military posts were routinely termed massacres. Knowing very little about the native inhabitants of the American frontier, the colonists were deeply fearful, and often, European Americans who had rarely – or never – seen a Native American read Indian atrocity stories in popular literature and newspapers. Emphasis was placed on the depredations of "murderous savages" in their information about Indians, and as the migrants headed further west, they frequently feared the Indians they would encounter.

The phrase eventually became commonly used to also describe mass killings of American Indians. Killings described as "massacres" often had an element of indiscriminate targeting, barbarism, or genocidal intent.

According to historian Jeffrey Ostler, "Any discussion of genocide must, of course, eventually consider the so-called Indian Wars, the term commonly used for U.S. Army campaigns to subjugate Indian nations of the American West beginning in the 1860s. In an older historiography, key events in this history were narrated as battles. It is now more common for scholars to refer to these events as massacres. This is especially so of a Colorado territorial militia's slaughter of Cheyennes at Sand Creek (1864) and the army's slaughter of Shoshones at Bear River (1863), Blackfeet on the Marias River (1870), and Lakotas at Wounded Knee (1890). Some scholars have begun referring to these events as "genocidal massacres", incidents which have a genocidal component but are committed on a smaller scale when they are compared to genocides. In the context of Indian massacres, Jeffrey Ostler defined them in 2015 as "the annihilation of a portion of a larger group, sometimes to provide a lesson to the larger group."

It is difficult to determine the total number of people who died as a result of Indian massacres. In The Wild Frontier: Atrocities during the American-Indian War from Jamestown Colony to Wounded Knee, lawyer William M. Osborn compiled a list of alleged and actual atrocities in what would eventually become the continental United States, from first contact in 1511 until 1890. His parameters for inclusion included the intentional and indiscriminate murder, torture, or mutilation of civilians, the wounded, and prisoners. His list included 7,193 people who died from atrocities perpetrated by those of European descent, and 9,156 people who died from atrocities perpetrated by Native Americans.

In An American Genocide, The United States and the California Catastrophe, 1846–1873, historian Benjamin Madley recorded the numbers of killings of California Indians between 1846 and 1873. He found evidence that during this period, at least 9,400 to 16,000 California Indians were killed by non-Indians. Most of these killings occurred in what he said were more than 370 massacres (defined by him as the "intentional killing of five or more disarmed combatants or largely unarmed noncombatants, including women, children, and prisoners, whether in the context of a battle or otherwise").

== List of massacres ==
This is a listing of some of the events reported then or referred to now as "Indian massacre".

=== Pre-Columbian era ===
Year	Date	Name	Current location	Description	Reported native casualties
1325		Crow Creek massacre	South Dakota	486 known dead were discovered at an archaeological site near Chamberlain, South Dakota. The victims and perpetrators were both unknown groups of Native Americans.	486

=== 1500–1830 ===
Year	Date	Name	Current location	Description	Reported casualties	Claimants
1518–19?		Annihilation of the Otomi of Tecoac	Tecoac, modern day Mexico	The entire Otomi population of Tecoac was reportedly killed during Hernán Cortés's first expedition into Mexico	All Otomis in Tecoac allegedly	
1519		Cholula massacre	Cholula, modern day Mexico	Cempoalans reported that fortifications were being constructed around the city and the Tlaxcalans were warning the Spaniards. Cortés ordered a pre-emptive strike, urged by the Tlaxcalans, the enemies of the Cholulans. Cortés confronted the city leaders in the main temple alleging that they were planning to attack his men. They admitted that they had been ordered to resist by Moctezuma, but they claimed they had not followed his orders. Regardless, on command, the Spaniards and Tlaxcalans seized and killed many of the local nobles to serve as a lesson.	3,000 to over 30,000	
1520		Alvarado Massacre	Tenochtitlan, modern day Mexico	The Massacre in the Great Temple, also called the Alvarado Massacre, was an event on May 22, 1520, in the Aztec capital Tenochtitlan during the Spanish conquest of Mexico, in which the celebration of the Feast of Toxcatl ended in a massacre of Aztec elites.		
1521		Massacre after the fall of Tenochtitlan	Tenochtitlan, modern day Mexico	After the Fall of Tenochtitlan the remaining Aztec warriors and civilians fled the city as the Spanish allies, primarily the Tlaxcalans, continued to attack even after the surrender, slaughtering thousands of the remaining civilians and looting the city. The Tlaxcalans did not spare women or children: they entered houses, stealing all precious things they found, raping and then killing women, stabbing children. The survivors marched out of the city for the next three days. One source claims 6,000 were massacred in the town of Ixtapalapa alone.	At least 40,000 civilians killed or enslaved, 100,000 to 240,000 warriors and civilians killed in the siege overall	
1539		Napituca Massacre	Florida	After defeating resisting Timucuan warriors, Hernando de Soto had 200 executed, in the first large-scale massacre by Europeans on what later became U.S. soil.	200	
1540	October 18	Mabila Massacre	Alabama	The Choctaw retaliated against Hernando de Soto's expedition, killing 200 soldiers, as well as many of their horses and pigs, for their having burned down Mabila compound and killed c. 2,500 warriors and the paramount chief Tuskaloosa, who had hidden in houses of a fake village.	2,500	
1540–42		Mixtón War	Zacatecas, Mexico	The Caxcan Indigenous people of Mexico resist encroachment by the Spanish colonists.	4,500	
1541–42		Tiguex Massacres	New Mexico	After the invading Spaniards seized the houses, food and clothing of the Tiguex and raped their women, the Tiguex resisted. The Spanish attacked them, burning at the stake 50 people who had surrendered. Francisco Vásquez de Coronado's men laid siege to the Moho Pueblo, and after a months-long siege, they killed 200 fleeing warriors.	250	
1599	January 22–24	Acoma Massacre	New Mexico	Juan de Oñate led a punitive expedition against the natives in a three-day battle at the Acoma Pueblo, killing approximately 500 warriors and 300 civilians. King Philip III later punished Oñate for his excesses.	300	
1601		Sandia Mountains	New Mexico	Founder of the colony of New Mexico, Juan de Oñate, retaliated for the killing of two Spaniards by sending Spanish troops to destroy 3 Indian villages in the Sandia Mountains, New Mexico. According to one Spanish account, 900 Tompiro Indians were killed.	900	
1609		Orpax Massacre	Virginia	During The Starving Time at Jamestown in the Colony of Virginia, John Ratcliffe, president of the colony, and around 50 colonists went to meet with a group of Powhatan Indians to bargain for food. However, they were ambushed and only 16 survived. Ratcliffe was captured and later tortured to death.	33 (colonists)	
1610	August 9	Paspahegh Massacre	Virginia	Lord De la Warr sent 70 men to attack the Paspahegh Indians. They destroyed their main village near Jamestown, killing between 16 and 65 people. The wife and children of the village chief were captured and shortly afterwards put to death.	16–65	
1616-1620		Tepehuan revolt	Durango, Mexico	In Durango, the Tepehuan revolted against Spanish rule.	400 Spaniards and 1000 Indians died.	
1622	March 22	Jamestown Massacre	Virginia	Powhatan (Pamunkey) killed 347 English settlers throughout the Virginia colony, almost one-third of the English population of the Jamestown colony, in an effort to push the English out of Virginia. They then destroyed crops and livestock causing 500 more people to die of starvation, reducing the settler population to 180.	847 (English) (500 died from starvation)	
1622		Massacre of Matape	Sonora, Mexico	The Aibinos (Opatas) in 1622 stirred up opposition to the missionaries who were working on the middle Yaqui River among the Lower Pimas. The trouble was serious enough to cause Captain Hurdaide to send an expedition of two thousand soldiers to the vicinity of Matape, where they defeated the Indians in a bloody battle. This was followed by the entrance of two Jesuits who baptized some four hundred children at Matape and Tepupa.	An unknown number of Opatas (which left 400 children orphans)	
1623		Wessagusset affair	Massachusetts	Several Massachusett chiefs were lured to Wessagusset under peaceful pretenses and put to death. Other Indians present in the village were also killed.	4 (Native leaders) + unknown number of other Native Americans	
1623	May 12	Pamunkey Peace Talks	Virginia	In revenge for the Indian massacre of 1622, English colonists served poisoned wine at a "peace conference" with Powhatan leaders, killing about 200; they physically attacked and killed another 50.	250	
1626		Kalinago Genocide of 1626	Bloody Point, Saint Kitts and Nevis	2,000–4,000 Caribs were forced into the area of Bloody Point and Bloody River, where over 2,000 were massacred, though 100 settlers were also killed. One Frenchman went mad after being struck by a manchineel-poisoned arrow. The remaining Caribs fled, but by 1640, those not already enslaved, were removed to Dominica.	2,000	
1637	April 23	Wethersfield Attack	Connecticut	During the Pequot War, Wongunk chief Sequin attacked the Puritan town Wethersfield, Connecticut with Pequot help. Six men and 3 women were killed and 2 girls kidnapped.	9 (settlers)	
1637	May 26	Mystic Massacre	Connecticut	In response to the Wethersfield attack, 90 English colonists commanded by John Mason, with 70 Mohegan and 200 Narragansett allies, launched a night attack on a large Pequot village on the Mystic River in present-day Connecticut, where they burned the inhabitants in their homes and killed all survivors, for total fatalities of about 400–700.	400–700	
1637	July	Execution of Pequot prisoners	Connecticut	Shortly after their capture, between 20 and 30 Pequot prisoners were taken offshore and deliberately drowned. Their families were subsequently sold into slavery.	20–30	
1640	July	Staten Island	New York	80 Dutch soldiers under Cornelis van Tienhoven attacked a village of Raritans on Staten Island over stolen pigs. Van Tienhoven intended only to demand payment, but his men wanted to massacre the Indians and he eventually consented.		
1643	February 25	Pavonia Massacre	New York	In 1643 the Mohawk attacked a band of Wappinger and Tappan, who fled to New Amsterdam seeking the protection of New Netherland governor, William Kieft. Kieft dispersed them to Pavonia and Corlears Hook. They were later attacked, 129 being killed. This prompted the beginning of Kieft's War, driven by mercenary John Underhill.	129	
1643	August	Hutchinson Massacre	New York	As part of Kieft's War in New Netherland, near the Split Rock (now northeastern Bronx in New York City), local Lenape (or Siwanoy) killed settler Anne Hutchinson, six of her children, a son-in-law, and as many as seven others (servants). Susanna, one of Hutchinson's daughters, was taken captive and lived with the natives for several years.	15 (settlers)	
1644		Massapequa Massacre	New York	John Underhill's men killed more than 100 Indians near present-day Massapequa.	100+	
1644	April 18	Beginning of Third Anglo-Powhatan War	Virginia	Powhatan (Pamunkey) killed more than 400 English settlers throughout the Virginia colony, about 4 percent of the English population of the Jamestown colony, in a second effort to push the English out of Virginia.	400+ (English)	
1644	March	Pound Ridge Massacre	New York	As part of Kieft's War in New Netherland, at present day Pound Ridge, New York, John Underhill, hired by the Dutch, attacked and burned a sleeping village of Lenape, killing about 500 Indians.	500	
1655	September 11–15	Peach War	New York	In response to Director-General of New Netherland Peter Stuyvesant's attacks to their trading partners and allies at New Sweden, united bands of natives attacked Pavonia and Staten Island.	40	
1675	July	Susquehannock Massacre	Virginia	After a raid by Doeg Indians on a plantation in Virginia, which killed 2 settlers, a party of militiamen crossed the Potomac into Maryland and killed 14 members of the friendly Susquehannock tribe they found sleeping in their cabins.	14	
1675	July	Swansea Massacre	Massachusetts	Wampanoag warriors attack the town of Swansea, Massachusetts, killing 7 settlers. This attack marked the beginning of King Philip's War.	7 (settlers)	
1675	August	Lancaster Raid (1675)	Massachusetts	Nipmuc warriors attacked the town of Lancaster, Massachusetts, killing 7 inhabitants during King Philip's War.	7 (settlers)	
1675	September	Susquehannock chiefs massacre	Maryland	Following the massacre of 14 Susquehannock in July, five Susquehannock chiefs were executed after being invited to a parley by Maryland militia commander Thomas Truman.	5	
1675	December 15	Jireh Bull Blockhouse massacre	South Kingstown, Rhode Island	During King Philip's War, four days before the Great Swamp Fight, Jireh Bull Block House was burned by Narragansett warriors, and fifteen of its inhabitants were killed.	15 (settlers)	
1675	December 19	Great Swamp Massacre	Rhode Island	Colonial militia and Indian allies attacked a Narragansett fort near South Kingstown, Rhode Island. At least 40 warriors were killed and 300 to 1,000 women, children and elder men burnt in the village.	300–1,000	
1676	January	January 1676 Susquehannock raids	Virginia & Maryland	In a prelude to Bacon's Rebellion, Susquehannock warriors attacked plantations in retaliation for earlier attacks by colonists. They killed 60 settlers in Maryland and 36 in Virginia. Other tribes joined in, killing more settlers.	96+ (settlers)	
1676	February 10	Lancaster raid (1676)	Massachusetts	Four hundred Narragansett, Nipmuc, and Wampanoag warriors attacked the town of Lancaster, Massachusetts, killing 14 inhabitants and capturing 23 during King Philip's War.	14 (settlers)	
1676	March 26	Nine Men's Misery	Rhode Island	During King Philip's War, warriors subjected nine captive soldiers with ritual torture and death.	9 (settlers)	
1676	May	Massacre at Occoneechee Island	Virginia	Nathaniel Bacon turned on his Occaneechi allies and his men destroyed three forts within their village on Occoneechee Island, on the Roanoke River near present-day Clarksville, Virginia. Bacon's troops killed one hundred men as well as many women and children.	100–400	
1676	May 10	Turner Falls Massacre	Massachusetts	Captain William Turner and 150 militia volunteers attacked a fishing Indian camp at present-day Turners Falls, Massachusetts. At least 100 women and children were killed in the attack.	100	
1676	July 2	Rhode Island	Rhode Island	Militia volunteers under Major Talcott attacked a band of Narragansetts on Rhode Island, killing 34 men and 92 women and children.	126	
1676	July 3	Warwick Neck Massacre	Rhode Island	Disregarding the promise of safety made to Narragansett sachem Potuck, Major Talcott's troops attacked 80 of his followers who had given themselves up, killing 18 and wounding or capturing 49. Although Potuck had been granted safe conduct to go to Newport, Rhode Island to negotiate terms, he was arrested and subsequently executed.	18	
1676	August	Dragon Swamp massacre	Virginia	During Bacon's Rebellion, Bacon's men, who were searching for Susquehannock, attacked friendly Pamunkeys in Dragon Swamp, killing many and capturing 45	Many killed + 45 captured	
1676	August 13	Woolwich massacre	Maine	During King Philip's War, Wabanaki fighters attacked Richard Hammond's fortified trading post in present-day Woolwich, Maine, killing fourteen and capturing others.	14 (settlers)	
1680	August 10	Pueblo Revolt	New Mexico	Pueblo warriors killed 401 Spanish settlers, and 21 Franciscan priests, and drove other Spaniards from New Mexico.	422 (Spaniards)	
1688	December	Fort St. Louis massacre	Victoria County, Texas	A French settlement, founded by explorer Robert Cavelier de La Salle on the Garcitas Creek in 1685, was attacked by Karankawa Indians. Twenty settlers were killed and the five survivors were taken captive.	20 (French)	
1688	July 25	Mototícachi massacre	Sonora	A Spanish force burns an O'odham village, kills all men of fighting age, and forcibly relocates the survivors	42	
1689	August 5	Lachine massacre	Quebec	1,500 Mohawk warriors attacked the small settlement of Lachine, New France and killed more than 90 of the village's 375 French residents, in response to widespread French attacks on Mohawk villages in present-day New York.	90 (French)	
1689		Zia Pueblo	New Mexico	Governor Jironza de Cruzate sacked and burned Zia Pueblo, New Mexico. 600 Indians were killed and 70 survivors were enslaved.	600	
1689	June 27–28	Cochecho Massacre	New Hampshire	Members of the newly formed Wabanaki Confederacy arrived at Dover, New Hampshire led by Chief Kancamagus. They killed 23 residents and captured 29 beginning King William's War.	23 (English)	
1690	February 8	Schenectady Massacre	New York	As part of the Beaver Wars, French and Algonquins destroyed Schenectady, New York, killing 60 Dutch and English settlers, including ten women and at least twelve children.	60 (Dutch and English)	
1690	March 27	Raid on Salmon Falls	Maine	During King William's War, Joseph-François Hertel de la Fresnière, along with Norridgewock Abnaki chief Wahowa, led soldiers of Acadia and the Wabanaki Confederacy to destroy the settlement of Salmon Falls (present-day Berwick, Maine), killing 34 settlers and captured 54.	34 (English)	
1690	May 16–20	Raid on Falmouth	Maine	Joseph-François Hertel de la Fresnière and Baron de St Castin led soldiers of New France and the Wabanaki Confederacy to capture and destroy Fort Loyal and the English settlement on the Falmouth during King William's War, killing 200 settlers.	200 (English)	
1692	January 24	Candlemas Massacre	Maine	During King William's War, 200–300 Abenaki and Canadiens killed 75, took 100 prisoner and burned the encroaching town of York, Maine district of the Province of Massachusetts Bay	75 (non-Indians)	
1693	December 30	Santa Fe reconquest	New Mexico	Diego de Vargas leading about 800 people, including 100 soldiers, and returned to Santa Fe on December 16, 1693. They were opposed by 70 Pueblo warriors and 400 family members within the town. De Vargas and his forces recaptured the town. 70 Pueblo warriors were executed on December 30, and their families were sentenced to ten years' servitude.	70	
1694	July 18	Oyster River massacre	New Hampshire	During King William's War, Claude-Sébastien de Villieu led 250 members of the Wabanaki Confederacy to attack and destroy the settlement of Oyster River (present-day Durham, New Hampshire). They killed 104 English settlers and captured 27. Much of the settlement was destroyed and pillaged. Crops were also destroyed and livestock killed, causing famine among the survivors.	104 (English)	
1695	June 9	La Matanza	Sonora, Mexico	Spanish militia with Seri Indian auxiliaries killed 49 O'odham Indians (formerly known in the United States as Pima Indians) at peace conference at the El Tupo Cienega (also called San Miguel del Tupo) two months after the Tubutama Uprising. The meadow became known as La Matanza - Place of The Slaughter.	49	
1696		1696 Pueblo revolt	New Mexico	In 1696, members of the fourteen pueblos attempted a second organized revolt, launched with the killing of five missionaries and thirty-four settlers and using weapons the Spanish themselves had traded to the natives over the years.	39 (Spaniards)	
1697	March 15	Raid on Haverhill	Massachusetts	During King William's War, in a raid ordered by Louis de Buade de Frontenac, Governor General of New France, Abenaki warriors led by Chief Nescambious, attacked Haverhill, killing 27 settlers and taking 13 captives. One of those captives, Hannah Duston, stated that the Abenaki killed her baby during the journey to an island in the Merrimack River. In April, Duston and two other captives killed and scalped ten of the Abenaki family holding them hostage.	28 (English)	
1703	August	Six Terrible Days	Maine	During Queen Anne's War , Alexandre Leneuf de La Vallière de Beaubassin led 500 members of the Wabanaki Confederacy and a small number of French soldiers. They attacked and destroyed English settlements on the coast of present-day Maine between Wells and Casco Bay, burning more than 15 leagues of New England country and killing or capturing many English settlers.	150 to 300 killed or captured (English)	
1704		Apalachee Massacre	Florida	50 English colonists and 1,000 Muscogee allies under former Carolina Governor James Moore launched a series of brutal attacks on the Apalachee villages of Northern Florida. They killed 1,000 Apalachees and enslaved at least 2,000 survivors.	1,000	
1704	February 29	Deerfield Massacre	Massachusetts	During Queen Anne's War, a force composed of Abenaki, Kanienkehaka, Wyandot and Pocumtuck, accompanied by a small contingent of French-Canadian militia and led by Jean-Baptiste Hertel de Rouville, sacked the town of Deerfield, Massachusetts, killing 56 civilians and taking more than 100 as captives.	56 (non-Indians)	
1711	September 22	Massacre at Bath	North Carolina	The Southern Tuscarora, Pamplico, Cothechneys, Cores, Mattamuskeets and Matchepungoes attacked settlers at several locations in and around the city of Bath, North Carolina. Hundreds of settlers were killed, and many more were driven off.	Hundreds (settlers)	
1712		Massacre at Fort Narhantes	North Carolina	The North Carolina militia and their Indian allies attacked the Southern Tuscarora at Fort Narhantes on the banks of the Neuse River. More than 300 Tuscarora were killed, and one hundred were sold into slavery.	300	
1712	May	Fox Indian Massacre	Michigan	During the First Fox War, French troops alongside their Indian allies killed around 1,000 Fox Indians men, women and children in a five-day massacre near the head of the Detroit River.	1,000 (including warriors)	
1712		Tzeltal rebellion	Chiapas, Mexico	A number of Maya communities in the Soconusco region of Chiapas rose in rebellion.	+1000	
1713	March 20–23	Fort Neoheroka	South Carolina	Colonial Militia volunteers and Indian allies under Colonel James Moore attacked Ft. Neoheroka, the main stronghold of the Tuscarora Indians. 200 Tuscaroras were burned to death in the village and 170 more were killed outside the fort while more than 400 were taken to South Carolina and sold into slavery. 900–1,000 were killed or captured in total.	370	
1715	April 15	Pocotaligo Massacre	South Carolina	Yamassee Indians killed 4 British traders and representatives of Carolina at Pocotaligo, near present-day Yemassee, South Carolina. 90 other traders were killed in the following weeks.	94 (traders)	
1715	April	Massacre at St Bartholemew's Parish	South Carolina	At the onset of the Yamasee War, Yamasee Indians attacked St Bartholomew's Parish in South Carolina, killing over 100 settlers. Subsequent attacks around Charles Town killed many more, and in total, about 7% of the colony's white population perished in the conflict.	100+ (settlers)	
1715	May	Schenkingh Plantation	South Carolina	A band of Catawba and Cherokee warriors attacked Benjamin Schenkingh's plantation where about 20 settlers had taken refuge. All were killed.	20 (settlers)	
1724	August 24	Norridgewock Massacre	Maine	Captains Jeremiah Moulton and Johnson Harmon led 200 rangers to the Abenaki village of Norridgewock, Maine to kill Father Sébastien Rale and destroy the Indian settlement. The rangers massacred 80 Abenakis including two dozen women and children and 26 warriors. The rangers suffered 3 dead.	80 (26 warriors)	
1729	November 29	Natchez Revolt	Mississippi	Natchez Indians attacked French settlements near present-day Natchez, Mississippi, killing more than 200 French colonists.	200 (French)	
1729	December 4	Massacre of Chaouacha village	Louisiana	Governor Perier ordered 80 enslaved Blacks to attack the village of the Chaouacha Indians. At least 7 Indians were killed.	7	
1730	September 9	Massacre at Fox Fort	Illinois	A combined force 1,400 French soldiers and their Indian allies massacred around 500 Fox Indians (including 300 women and children) as they tried to flee their besieged camp.	500 (including 200 warriors)	
1736	June 6	Lake of the Woods Massacre	Minnesota	Sioux warriors ambushed and killed a group of 21 men, including Jean Baptiste de La Vérendrye and Jean-Pierre Aulneau, soon after they left Fort St. Charles on Lake of the Woods to go to Fort Kaministiquia for provisions.	21 (French)	
1745		1745 Massacre at Walden	New York	Upon hearing of an impending French and Indian attack upon the Ulster county frontiers, British colonists massacred several peaceful Munsee families near Walden, New York.	Several families	
1747	October	Chama River	New Mexico	Spanish troops ambushed a group of Utes on the Chama River, killing 111 Indians and taking 206 as captives.	111	
1751	November	Pima Revolt	Arizona	During a revolt against Spanish rule by Pima Indians, more than 100 Spanish settlers were killed. The uprising began on November 20 in Sáric with the massacre of 18 settlers who had been lured to the home of the rebellion's leader Luis Oacpicagigua, who had previously served as a provincial "Indian governor" for the Spanish.	100+ (Spanish)	
1752	June 21	Raid on Pickawillany	Ohio	14 Miami killed, including their chief Memeskia who was then boiled and eaten. Three English traders were also killed.	17	
1753	February 21	Attack at Mocodome	Nova Scotia	6 Mi'kmaq were killed	6	
1753	April 21	Attack at Jeddore	Nova Scotia	A British delegation met Mi'kmaq chief Jean-Baptiste Cope at the mouth of a river at Jeddore, Nova Scotia, during Father Le Loutre's War. The Mi'kmaq killed nine of the British delegates and spared the life of the French-speaking translator Anthony Casteel.	9 (British)	
1755	July 30	Draper's Meadow massacre	Virginia	1 soldier and 3 settlers killed, 2 wounded and 5 captured by Shawnee Indians at Draper's Meadow, Virginia	4	
1755	October 16	Penn's Creek massacre	Pennsylvania	Lenape Indians attacked a settlement on Penns Creek. It was the first of a series of raids on Pennsylvania settlements by Native American tribes allied with the French in the French and Indian War.	14 killed, 11 captured (German and Swiss settlers)	
1755	Oct 31-Nov 2	Great Cove massacre	Pennsylvania	100 Lenape and Shawnee Indians, led by the Lenape war captain Shingas, attacked a series of settlements in Great Cove and Little Cove and along the Conolloway Creeks near the Maryland border. This was a continuation of the hostilities by Native American tribes allied with the French in the French and Indian War that had begun with the Penn's Creek massacre, above.	47 either killed or captured (Scotch and Irish settlers) in the Great Cove settlement; at least 10 more in Little Cove and the Conolloway Creeks	
1755	November 24	Gnadenhütten massacre (Pennsylvania)	Pennsylvania	Lenape Indians (Munsee) attacked a Moravian missionary settlement (including Lenape and Mahican converts) in present-day Lehighton, Pennsylvania. It was a continuation of a series of raids on Pennsylvania settlements by Native American tribes allied with the French in the early stages of the French and Indian War.	11 killed, 1 captured and later died (German Moravian missionaries & families)	
1756	March 2	1756 Massacre at Walden	New York	On March 2, 1756, white vigilantes murdered 9 friendly Munsee Indians at Walden.	9	
1756	June 11	Fort Bigham attack	Fort Bigham, Pennsylvania	During the French and Indian War, Lenape warriors, led by Tamaqua, attacked Fort Bigham, killing or capturing 23 English civilians.	23 (English)	
1757	August 9	Massacre at Fort William Henry	New York	Following the fall of Fort William Henry during the French and Indian War, Indians allied with the French killed between 70 and 180 British and colonial prisoners.	70–180 (British)	
1757	September 19	Hochstetler massacre	Pennsylvania	Indians set fire to the Hochstetler homestead, killing 3 and capturing 3 others as they tried to escape.	3 (German)	
1757	October 1	Bloody Springs massacre	Pennsylvania	Lenape warriors attacked two farmsteads, killing 6 members of the Spatz family.	6 (German)	
1758	March 16	San Saba Mission Massacre	Texas	A large party of Comanche, Tonkawa and Hasinai Indians attacked the mission of San Saba, Texas, killing 8 and burning down the mission.	8 (missionaries)	
1759	October 4	St. Francis Raid	Quebec	During the French and Indian War, in retaliation for a rumored murder of a captured Stockbridge man and detention of Captain Quinten Kennedy of the Rogers' Rangers, Major Robert Rogers led a party of approximately 150 Rangers, regular troops and British-allied Mahican into the village of Odanak, Quebec. They killed up to 30 Abenaki people, among them women and children, as confirmed via conflicting reports.	30	
1763	May	Capture of Fort Sandusky	Ohio	During Pontiac's War, a group of Wyandots entered the British outpost Fort Sandusky under peaceful pretexts. The Wyandots then seized the fort and killed its 15-member garrison along with several British traders.	15+ (British)	
1763	June 23	Clendenin Massacre	West Virginia	Shawnee massacre of Clendenin adult males, captured women and children including John Ewing of Virginia.		
1763	September 14	Devil's Hole Massacre	New York	During the French and Indian War, Seneca allied with the French attacked a British supply train and soldiers just south of Fort Niagara. They killed 21 out of 24 teamsters from the supply train.	21 teamsters + 81 soldiers (British)	
1763	October 15	First Wyoming (Mill Creek) Massacre	Wilkes-Barre, Pennsylvania	A band of one hundred and thirty-five Native Americans killed about twenty settlers (of an estimated 100) from Connecticut, and burned their houses at Mill Creek. It was likely perpetrated by Captain Bull and his warriors after the report that colonists had murdered on April 16, 1763, his father, Teedyuscung, as well as the fact that the Wyoming lands (purportedly to be reserved for the Native Americans) were being possessed and settled by colonists.	20 colonists from Connecticut	
1763	December	Killings by the Paxton Boys	Conestoga Town & Lancaster, Pennsylvania	In response to Pontiac's Rebellion, frontier Pennsylvania settlers killed 20 peaceful Susquehannock.	20	
1764	May 26	Fort Cumberland	Maryland	During Pontiac's War, 15 settlers working in a field near Fort Cumberland were killed by Native Americans.	15 (settlers)	
1764	June 14	Fort Loudoun	Pennsylvania	During Pontiac's War, 13 settlers near Fort Loudoun were killed and their homes burned in an attack by Native Americans.	13 (settlers)	
1764	July 26	Enoch Brown school massacre	Franklin County; Pennsylvania	During Pontiac's War, Four Lenape Indians killed a schoolmaster and 10 pupils. One pupil was scalped but survived. A pregnant woman had been killed by the same group of Lenape in a separate incident the day before.	11	
1765	May 4	Anderson's barn massacre	Staunton; Virginia	Five Cherokee, allied with Col. Andrew Lewis (soldier), were treacherously killed by the "Augusta Boys", as a declared emulation of the 1763 Paxton Boys lynch squad.	5	
1771	July 17	Bloody Falls massacre	Kugluktuk, Nunavut	The Bloody Falls massacre was an incident believed to have taken place during Samuel Hearne's exploration of the Coppermine River for copper deposits. According to Hearne Chipewyan and "Copper Indian" Dene men led by Hearne's guide and companion Matonabbee attacked a group of Copper Inuit, killing over 20 men, women and children.	20+	
1774	September	Spanish Peaks	New Mexico	Spanish troops surprised a large fortified Comanche village near Spanish Peaks (Raton, New Mexico). They killed nearly 300 Indians (men, women and children) and took 100 captives.	300	
1774	April 30	Yellow Creek Massacre	Hancock County, West Virginia	Daniel Greathouse killed members of Chief Logan's family.	12	
1778	July 3	Battle of Wyoming	Wyoming Valley, Pennsylvania	During the American Revolutionary War, following a battle with rebel defenders of Forty Fort, Haudenosaunee allies of Loyalist forces hunted and killed those who fled; they were later accused of using ritual torture to kill those soldiers who surrendered. These claims were denied by Haudenosaunee and British leaders at the time.	340 (colonists)	
1778	August 31	Stockbridge Massacre	Massachusetts	An ambush by the Queen's Rangers during the American Revolutionary War that left nearly 40 Stockbridge Militia dead.	40	
1778	November 11	Cherry Valley Massacre	New York	British and Seneca forces attacked the fort and village at Cherry Valley, New York, killing 16 rebel troops and more than 30 settlers.	46 (settlers)	
1780	June 27	Westervelt Massacre	Kentucky	Seventeen Dutch settlers killed and two taken captive out of a caravan of 41. The settler caravan was traveling between Low Dutch Station, Kentucky and Harrod's Town, Kentucky. The victims were all scalped and sold to the British for a bounty.	17 (Dutch)	
1781	September 1	Dietz Massacre	New York	During the Revolution, Haudenosaunee allied with the British attacked the home of Johannes Dietz, Berne, New York, killing and scalping Dietz, his wife, their daughter-in-law, four children of their son's family, and a servant girl.	8 (Dutch)	
1781	September 13	Long Run Massacre	Jefferson County, Kentucky	Thirty-two settlers killed by 50 Miami people while trying to move to safety, additionally approximately 15 settlers and 17 soldiers were killed attempting to bury the initial victims.	64 (settlers)	
1782	March 8	Gnadenhütten massacre	Gnadenhutten, Ohio	During the Revolution, Pennsylvania militiamen massacred nearly 100 non-combatant Christian Lenape, mostly women and children; they killed and scalped all but two young boys.	100	
1784	August 14	Awa'uq Massacre	Sitkalidak Island, Alaska	200 to 3000 Alutiiq (Sugpiaq) people were killed at Refuge Rock near Kodiak Island by Russian fur trader Grigory Shelekhov and 130 armed Russian men and cannoneers of his Shelikhov-Golikov Company.	200–3,000	
1788		Kirk Family Massacre	Tennessee	A party of Indians killed 11 members of the Kirk family (1 woman and 10 children) on Nine Mile Creek 12 miles south of present-day Knoxville.	11 (settlers)	
1788		Massacre of the Old chiefs	Tennessee	In retaliation to the Kirk Massacre, Old Tassel and 4 other chiefs of the Cherokee peace faction were lured into a trap and axed under a flag of truce in Chilhowee.	5	
1791	January 2	Big Bottom massacre	Ohio	14 settlers were killed by an Indian war party in Stockport, Morgan County, Ohio.	14 (settlers)	
1791	November 4	Fort Recovery Massacre	Ohio	At present day Fort Recovery, Ohio, an army of 1,500 Americans led by Arthur St. Clair, was ambushed by an army of Miami Indians led by chief Little Turtle. 200 to 250 civilians were killed.	200–250 (Americans)	
1793	September 25	Cavett's Station massacre	Tennessee	During the Cherokee–American wars, settlers at Cavett's Station were surrounded by Cherokee and Muscogee warriors. They agreed to surrender following negotiations with one of the leading warriors Bob Benge, who promised no captives would be harmed, however a group led by Doublehead began killing the settlers. One of the Cherokee leaders, James Vann tried unsuccessfully to save two children.	13 (settlers)	
1794	November 11	Sevier's Station massacre	Clarksville, Tennessee	During the Cherokee–American wars, Chickamauga Cherokee warriors attacked Sevier's Station and killed fourteen of the inhabitants. Valentine Sevier was one of the few survivors of the attack.	14 (settlers)	
1803	March 22	Yuquot massacre	Yuquot, British Columbia	Nuu-chah-nulth, led by chief Maquinna, attacked and killed most of the crew of the American trading ship "Boston" . They had boarded the ship under a pretense to trade. Only two of the crew survived, including John R. Jewitt who wrote a famous captivity narrative about his nearly 3 years in captivity.	26 (sailors)	
1805	January	Canyon del Muerto	Arizona	Spanish soldiers led by Antonio Narbona massacred 115 Navajo Indians (mostly women, children and old men) in Canyon del Muerto, northeastern Arizona.	115	
1811	June 15	Battle of Woody Point	Clayoquot Sound, British Columbia	Nuu-chah-nulth, led by chief Wickaninnish, attacked and captured of the crew of the Tonquin, an American merchant ship of the Astor Expedition which was there to trade for furs. They attacked because the ship's lieutenant had insulted the chief the day before. The one surviving sailor on the ship then destroyed the ship the day after the massacre by detonating the powder magazine, killing over 100 people plundering the ship. Four sailors who had escaped in a skiff during the initial attack were pushed ashore by a storm and captured and tortured to death in revenge for the explosion.	29 (sailors)	
1812	August 15	Fort Dearborn Massacre (Battle of Fort Dearborn)	Illinois	During the War of 1812, Indians allied with the British killed American soldiers and settlers evacuating Fort Dearborn (site of present-day Chicago, Illinois). In all, 26 soldiers, two officers, two women and 12 children, and 12 trappers and settlers hired as scouts, were killed.	54 (non-Indians)	
1812	September 3	Pigeon Roost Massacre	Indiana	During the War of 1812, twenty four settlers, including fifteen children, were massacred by a war party of Native Americans (mostly Shawnee, but possibly including some Lenape and Potawatomis) in a surprise attack on a small village located in what is today Scott County, Indiana.	24 (settlers)	
1813	January 22	River Raisin Massacre	Michigan	During the War of 1812, Indians allied with the British killed between 30 and 60 Kentucky militia after their surrender.	30–60 (Americans)	
1813	August 30	Fort Mims Massacre	Alabama	After a Muscogee victory at the Battle of Burnt Corn, a band of Muscogee Red Sticks attacked Fort Mims, in what today is Alabama, killing 400–500 settlers, slaves, militiamen, and Muscogee loyalists and taking 250 scalps. This action brought the US into the internal Creek War, at the same time as the War of 1812.	400–500 (settlers)	
1813	September 1	Kimbell-James Massacre	Mississippi	Immediately after departing Fort Mims, Red Sticks warriors led by Josiah Francis (Prophet Francis) attacked the Kimbell and James families seeking refuge near Fort Sinquefield. At least 15 were killed, mostly women and children.	15 (settlers)	
1813	November 3	Battle of Tallushatchee	Tennessee	900 Tennessee troops under General John Coffee, and including Davy Crockett, attacked an unsuspecting Creek town. About 186–200 Creek warriors were killed, and an unknown number of women and children were killed, some burned in their houses.	180-300 (including warriors)	
1813	November 18	Hillabee Massacre	Alabama	Tennessee troops under General White launched a dawn attack on an unsuspecting Creek town (the village leaders were engaged in peace negotiations with General Andrew Jackson). About 65 Creek Indians were shot or bayoneted.	65	
1813	November 29	Autossee Massacre (Battle of Autossee)	Alabama	Georgia Militia General Floyd attacked a Creek town on Tallapoosa River, in Macon County, Alabama, killing 200 Indians before setting the village afire.	200 (including warriors)	
1814		San Nicolas Island Massacre	San Nicolas Island, California	A party of Aleut otter hunters working for the Russian-American Company (RAC) arrived on the island and massacred most of the Nicoleño islanders after accusing them of killing an Aleut hunter.		
1817	November 30	Scott Massacre	Florida	In retaliation for the sacking of a Mikasuki village, Seminole Indians ambushed a US army boat under the command of Lt. Richard W. Scott on the Apalachicola River. There were ca. 50 people on the boat, including forty soldiers (of which twenty were sick), seven wives of soldiers and possibly four children. Most of the boat's passengers were killed. One woman was taken prisoner, and six survivors made it to Fort Scott.	41–45 (settlers and soldiers)	
1822	March	Jemez Pueblo Massacre	New Mexico	24 Navajo emissaries travelling to a peace conference in Santa Fe were murdered by Mexican soldiers in Jimez Pueblo, New Mexico.	24	
1823	February	Skull Creek Massacre	Texas	After Coco Indians killed two colonists under unclear circumstances, the colonists got together twenty-five men and found a Karankawa people village on Skull Creek. They killed at least nineteen inhabitants of the village before the rest could flee, then stole their possessions and burned their homes to the ground.	19+	
1823	June 2	General Ashley's 1823 expedition massacre	South Dakota	Arikara warriors killed 12 trappers working for General William Henry Ashley's Rocky Mountain Fur Company on the Missouri River. Many others were wounded, with the survivors, including Hugh Glass, Jedediah Smith, and Jim Bridger fleeing down river. The Arikara had recently traded with the trappers but were angry with them because weeks earlier they had rescued several Sioux who were being hunted by the Arikara. The attack led to the Arikara War.	12 (trappers)	
1824	March 22	Fall Creek Massacre	Indiana	Six settlers in Madison County, Indiana killed and robbed eight Seneca. One suspect escaped trial and two others was a witness at subsequent trial. The remaining four suspects were all convicted of murder and sentenced to death by hanging. One man was executed on January 12, 1825, and two others were hanged on June 2, 1825. The last defendant, a teenager, was pardoned moments before he could be hanged. The court had recommended a pardon for him due to his age and the influence of his codefendants, which included his father and uncle, whose executions he'd just witnessed.	8	
1824	February 21	Battle of Mission Santa Inés	Solvang, California	A revolt by Chumash Indians erupted, with the takeover and burning of Mission Santa Inés. Mexican reinforcements arrived the next day and forced the rebels out. 15 Chumash women and children were killed at the mission on the first day of the revolt.	15	
1826		Dressing Point Massacre	Texas	A posse of Anglo-Texan settlers massacred a large community of Karankawa Indians near the mouth of the Colorado River in Matagorda County, Texas. Between 40 and 50 Karankawas were killed.	40–50	

=== 1830–1915 ===
Year	Date	Name	Current location	Description	Reported casualties	Claimants
1830	June	1830 Prairie du Chien massacre	Prairie du Chien, Wisconsin	Dakotas (Santee Sioux) and Menominees killed fifteen Meskwakis attending a multi-tribal treaty conference, mediated by the American government, at Prairie du Chien.	15	
1831	July	1831 Prairie du Chien massacre	Prairie du Chien, Wisconsin	In retaliation to the earlier 1830 massacre at Prairie du Chien, a party of Meskwakis and Sauks killed twenty-six Menominees, including women and children at Prairie du Chien in July 1831.	26	
1832	May 20	Indian Creek Massacre	Illinois	A party of Potawatomi, with a few Sauk allies, killed fifteen men, women and children and kidnapped two young women, who were later ransomed.	15 (settlers)	
1832	August 1	Battle of Bad Axe	Wisconsin	Soldiers under General Henry Atkinson, armed volunteers and Dakota Sioux killed around 150 Fox and Sauk men, women and children near present-day Victory, Wisconsin. The US suffered 5 dead.	150 (including warriors)	
1833	Exact date unknown	Cutthroat Gap Massacre	Oklahoma	The Osage tribe attacked a Kiowa camp west of the Wichita Mountains in southwest Oklahoma, killing 150 Kiowa Indians.	150	
1836	May 19	Fort Parker Massacre	Texas	Comanche killed seven European Americans in Limestone County, Texas. The five captured included Cynthia Ann Parker.	7 (Europeans)	
1837		Amador Massacre	California	Mexican colonists under Jose Maria Amador captured an entire rancheria of friendly Miwok Indians in Northern California and killed their 200 prisoners in two mass executions.	200	
1837	April 22	Johnson Massacre	New Mexico	At least 20 Apaches were killed near Santa Rita del Cobre, New Mexico while trading with a group of American settlers led by John Johnson. The Anglos blasted the Apaches with a cannon loaded with musket balls, nails and pieces of glass and finished off the wounded.	20	
1837	August 8	Santa Fe massacre	Santa Fe, New Mexico	During the start of a popular revolt against New Mexico Governor Albino Pérez, 22 government officials, including Perez and former Governor Santiago Abréu were captured and killed, some by mutilation, by Santo Domingo Pueblo who had joined the rebellion.	22 (Mexicans)	
1838	October 5	Killough Massacre	Texas	A party of Cherokee massacred eighteen members and relatives of the Killough family in Texas.	18 (settlers)	
1838	April	Ambush Park	Minnesota	A group of nine Ojibwe led by chief Hole in the Day were welcomed as guests into a camp of Dakota, who served them a meal. During the night the Ojibwe attacked the sleeping Dakota, killing seven, wounding two more, and taking a third captive.	7	
1838 or 1839	Exact date unknown	Webster Massacre	Texas	The Comanche killed a party of settlers attempting to ford the Bushy Creek near present-day Leander, Texas. All of the Anglo men were killed and Mrs. Webster and her two children were captured.	10 (settlers)	
1840	March 19	Council House Massacre	Texas	The 12 leaders of a Comanche delegation were shot in San Antonio, Texas while trying to escape the local jail. 23 others including 5 women and children were killed in or around the city. 65 Comanche including 35 women and children were present. 7 Texas militia were also killed at the court house mostly from friendly fire. 13 captives were killed in retaliation by the Comanche.	35 (Indians) + 13 (Whites)	
1840	August 7	Indian Key Massacre	Florida	During the Seminole Wars, so called "Spanish Indians" attacked and destroyed the settlement on Indian Key, killing 13 inhabitants, including noted horticulturist Dr. Henry Perrine.	13 (settlers)	
1840	August 7	Linnville Raid	Texas	During the Great Raid of 1840, Comanche warriors attacked the settlements of Victoria and Linnville killing 14 Whites, 8 Blacks and 1 Mexican.	23 (settlers)	
1840	October 24	Red Fork of the Colorado River	Texas	Volunteer Rangers, consisting of 90 Texans and 17 Lipan Apaches, under Colonel John Moore, attacked a Comanche village on the Colorado, killing 140 men, women and children and capturing 35 others (mostly small children).	140	
1840	Exact date unknown	Clear Lake Massacre	California	A posse led by Mexican Salvador Vallejo massacred 150 Pomo and Wappo Indians on Clear Lake, California.	150	
1844	February 9	Fort Mackenzie Massacre	Montana	White traders fired a small cannon on a group of unsuspecting Blackfeet approaching the gates of Fort Mackenzie for trade. They finished off the dying with daggers. Up to 30 Blackfeet were killed.	30	
1846	April 6	Sacramento River massacre	California	Captain Frémont's men attacked a band of Indians (probably Wintun) on the Sacramento River in California, killing between 120 and 200 Indians.	120–200	
1846	May 12	Klamath Lake massacre	California	Captain Frémont's men, led by Kit Carson attacked a village of Klamaths on the banks of Klamath Lake, killing at least 14 Klamath people.	14+	
1846	June	Sutter Buttes massacre	California	Captain Frémont's men attacked a rancheria on the banks of the Sacramento River near Sutter Buttes, killing several Patwin people.	14+	
1846	July 6	Kirker Massacre	Chihuahua	Irish-born American Scalp hunter James Kirker was hired by the Mexican government to kill or capture Apache Indians. Alongside local Mexican citizens, he lured a band of Chiricahua Apaches into Galeana, Chihuahua and got them drunk. After the "festivities", Kirker's men killed and scalped 130 men, women and children.	130	
1846	December	Pauma massacre	California	11 Californio were killed by Luiseño Indians at Pauma Valley north of Escondido, California.	11 (settlers)	
1846	December	Temecula massacre	California	A combined force of Californio militia and Cahuilla Indians killed 33 to 40 Luiseño Indians in Temecula, California in revenge for the Pauma Massacre.	33–40	
1847	February 3–4	Storming of Pueblo de Taos	New Mexico	In response to a New Mexican-instigated uprising in Taos, American troops attacked the heavily fortified Pueblo of Taos with artillery, killing nearly 150 rebels, some being Indians. Between 25 and 30 prisoners were shot by firing squads.	25–30	
1847	March	Rancheria Tulea massacre	California	White slavers retaliate to a slave escape by massacring five Indians in Rancheria Tulea.	5	
1847	March 29	Kern and Sutter massacres	California	In response to a plea from White settlers to put an end to raids, U.S. Army Captain Edward Kern and rancher John Sutter led 50 men in attacks on three Indian villages.	20	
1847	late June/early July	Konkow Maidu slaver massacre	California	Slavers kill 12–20 Konkow Maidu Indians in the process of capturing 30 members of the tribe for the purpose of forced slavery.	12–20	
1847	November 29	Whitman massacre	Washington	Cayuse and Umatilla warriors killed the missionaries Dr. Marcus Whitman, Mrs. Narcissa Whitman and 12 others at Walla Walla, Washington, in retaliation for the belief that Whitmans were responsible for the deaths of 200 natives from measles, triggering the Cayuse War. Subsequently, the U.S. hanged 5 Cayuse, including the Waiilatpu Leader Tiloukaikt.	14 (missionaries)	
1848	April	Brazos River	Texas	A hunting party of 26 friendly Wichita and Caddo Indians was massacred by Texas Rangers under Captain Samuel Highsmithe, in a valley south of Brazos River. 25 men and boys were killed, and only one child managed to escape.	26	
1849	March 5	Battle Creek massacre	Utah	In response to some cattle being stolen, Governor Brigham Young sent members of the Mormon militia to "put a final end to their depredations". They were led to a band, where they attacked them, killing the men and taking the women and children as captives.	4 (more by some accounts)	
1850	Feb 8	Battle at Fort Utah	Utah	Governor Brigham Young issued a partial extermination order of the Timpanogos who lived in Utah Valley. In the north, the Timpanogos were fortified. However, in the south, the Mormon militia told them they were friendly before lining them up to execute them. Dozens of women and children were enslaved and taken to Salt Lake City, Utah, where many died.	102 + "many" in captivity	
1850	May 15	Bloody Island Massacre	California	Nathaniel Lyon and his U.S. Army detachment of cavalry killed 60–100 Pomo people on Bo-no-po-ti island near Clear Lake, (Lake Co., California); they believed the Pomo had killed two Clear Lake settlers who had been abusing and murdering Pomo people. (The Island Pomo had no connections to the enslaved Pomo). This incident led to a general outbreak of settler attacks against and mass killing of native people all over Northern California. Site is California Registered Historical Landmark #427	60–100	
1851	January 11	Mariposa War	California	The gold rush increased pressure on the Native Americans of California, because miners forced Native Americans off their gold-rich lands. Many were pressed into service in the mines; others had their villages raided by the army and volunteer militia. Some Native American tribes fought back, beginning with the Ahwahneechees and the Chowchilla in the Sierra Nevada and San Joaquin Valley leading a raid on the Fresno River post of James D. Savage, in December 1850. In retaliation Mariposa County Sheriff James Burney led local militia in an indecisive clash with the natives on January 11, 1851, on a mountainside near present-day Oakhurst, California.	40+	
1851	March	Oatman Massacre	Arizona	Royce Oatman's emigrant party of 7 was killed by Mohave or Yavapai Indians. The survivors, Olive and Mary Ann Oatman were enslaved. Olive escaped five years later and spoke extensively about the experience.	7 (settlers)	
1851		Old Shasta Town	California	Miners killed 300 Wintu Indians near Old Shasta, California and burned down their tribal council meeting house.	300	
1852		Hynes Bay Massacre	Texas	Texas militiamen attacked a village of 50 Karankawas, killing 45 of them.	45	
1852	April 23	Bridge Gulch Massacre	California	70 American men led by Trinity County sheriff William H. Dixon killed more than 150 Wintu people in the Hayfork Valley of California, in retaliation for the killing of Col. John Anderson.	150	
1852	November	Wright Massacre	California	White settlers led by a notorious Indian hunter named Ben Wright massacred 41 Modocs during a "peace parley".	41	
1853		Howonquet Massacre	California	Californian settlers attacked and burned the Tolowa village of Howonquet, massacring 70 people.	70	
1853		Yontoket Massacre	California	A posse of settlers attacked and burned a Tolowa rancheria at Yontocket, California, killing 450 Tolowa during a prayer ceremony.	450	
1853		Achulet Massacre	California	White settlers launched an attack on a Tolowa village near Lake Earl in California, killing between 65 and 150 Indians at dawn.	65–150	
1853	Before December 31	"Ox" incident	California	U.S. forces attacked and killed an unreported number of Indians in the Four Creeks area (Tulare County, California) in what was referred to by officers as "our little difficulty" and "the chastisement they have received".		
1854	January 28	Nasomah Massacre	Oregon	40 white settlers attacked the sleeping village of the Nasomah Indians at the mouth of the Coquille River in Oregon, killing 15 men and 1 woman.	16	
1854	February 15	Chetco River Massacre	Oregon	Nine white settlers attacked a friendly Indian village on the Chetco River in Oregon, massacring 26 men and a few women. Most of the Indians were shot while trying to escape. Two Chetco who tried to resist with bows and arrows were burned alive in their houses. Shortly before the attack, the Chetco had been induced to give away their weapons as "friendly relations were firmly established".	36+	
1854	May 15	Asbill Massacre	California	Six white settlers from Missouri attacked previously uncontacted Indians in the Round Valley, massacring approximately 40 of them.	40	
1854	August 20	Ward Massacre	Idaho	Shoshone killed 18 of the 20 members of the Alexander Ward party, attacking them on the Oregon Trail in western Idaho. This event led the U.S. eventually to abandon Fort Boise and Fort Hall, in favor of the use of military escorts for emigrant wagon trains.	18 (settlers)	
1854	Dec 25	Fort Pueblo Massacre	Colorado	16 settlers were killed by Utah & Apache	16 (settlers)	
1855	January 22	Klamath River massacres	California	In retaliation for the murder of six settlers and the theft of some cattle, whites commenced a "war of extermination against the Indians" in Humboldt County, California.		
1855	September 2	Harney Massacre	Nebraska	US troops under Brigadier General William S. Harney killed 86 Sioux, men, women and children at Blue Water Creek, in present-day Nebraska. 27 US soldiers also died in the skirmish. About 70 women and children were taken prisoner. Women and children accounted for about half of the Sioux deaths.	86 (including warriors)	
1855	October 8	Lupton Massacre	Oregon	During the Rogue River Wars, a group of settlers and miners launched a night attack on an Indian village near Upper Table Rock, Oregon, killing 23 Indians (mostly elderly men, women and children).	23	
1855	October	Gold Beach Massacre	Oregon	During the Rogue River Wars, in response to the Lupton massacre, Indians killed 27 settlers in what later became Gold Beach.	27 (settlers)	
1855	December 23	Little Butte Creek	Oregon	Oregon volunteers launched a dawn attack on a Tututni and Takelma camp on the Rogue River. Between 19 and 26 Indians were killed.	19–26	
1856	June	Grande Ronde River Valley Massacre	Oregon	Washington Territorial Volunteers under Colonel Benjamin Shaw attacked a peaceful Cayuse and Walla Walla Indians on the Grande Ronde River in Oregon. 60 Indians, mostly women, old men and children were killed.	60	
1856	March	Shingletown	California	In reprisal for Indian stock theft, white settlers massacred at least 20 Yana men, women and children near Shingletown, California.	20	
1856	March 26	Cascades Massacre	Oregon/Washington	Yakama, Klickitat and Cascades warriors attacked white soldiers and settlers at the Cascades of the Columbia River for controlling portage of the river and denying them their source of nutrition. Nine Cascades Indians who surrendered without a fight, including Chenoweth, Chief of the Hood River Band, were improperly charged and executed.	17 (settlers)	
1857	Mar 8–12	Spirit Lake Massacre	Iowa	Thirty-five to 40 settlers were killed and 4 taken captive by Santee Sioux in the last Indian attack on settlers in Iowa.	35–40 (settlers)	
1857	Sep 7-11	Mountain Meadows Massacre	Utah	Between 14 and 200 Paiutes (perhaps reluctantly) participated in an attack staged by the Mormon Militia against the Baker-Fancher wagon train from Arkansas. The Mormons of the area erroneously feared that the settlers were part of a plot by the US Army to invade Utah. The settlers surrender after a few days but are subsequently massacred by members of the Militia who suspected that the settlers had recognized that some of the attackers were non-Indians in disguise.	120 to 140 settlers killed. 17 younger children were passed out to local families, later repatriated to their families back in Arkansas.	
1856–1859		Round Valley Settler Massacres	California	White settlers killed over a thousand Yuki Indians in Round Valley over the course of three years in an uncountable number of separate massacres.	1000+	
1858	Aug 9–17	Fraser Canyon War	British Columbia	Settlers killed dozens of Nlaka'pamux non-combatants and burned five villages.	36+	
July 1859 to January 1860		Jarboe's War	California	White settlers calling themselves the "Eel River Rangers", led by Walter Jarboe, kill at least 283 Indian men and countless women and children in 23 engagements over the course of six months. They are reimbursed by the U.S. government for their campaign.	283+	
1859-1860		Mendocino War	California	Settler intrusion and slave raids on native lands and subsequent native retaliation resulted in the deaths of hundreds of Yuki.	400+	
1859		Spring Valley Massacre	Nevada	In late summer or early autumn of 1859, a US Army company led by General Albert Sidney Johnston tracked down and attacked an encampment of the Western Shoshone north of the Bahsahwahbee area. US army interpreter and guide Elijah Nicholas Wilson estimated that 350 men were killed, as well as many women and children.	350 men 175–350 women and children	
1859	September	Pit River	California	White settlers massacred 70 Achomawi Indians (10 men and 60 women and children) in their village on Pit River in California.	70	
1859		Chico Creek	California	White settlers attacked a Maidu camp near Chico Creek in California, killing indiscriminately 40 Indians.	40	
1860	Exact date unknown	Massacre at Bloody Rock	California	A group of 65 Yuki Indians were surrounded and massacred by white settlers at Bloody Rock, in Mendocino County, California.	65	
1860	February 26	Indian Island Massacre	California	In three nearly simultaneous assaults on the Wiyot, at Indian Island, Eureka, Rio Dell, and near Hydesville, California white settlers killed between 80 and 250 Wiyot in Humboldt County, California. Victims were mostly women, children and elders, as reported by Bret Harte at Arcata newspaper. Other villages massacred within two days. The main site is National Register of Historic Places in the United States #66000208.	80–250	
1860	December 18	Battle of Pease River	Texas	Texas Rangers under Captain Sul Ross attacked a Comanche village in Foard County, Texas, killing at least 14 unarmed people.	14	
1860	September 8	Otter Massacre	Idaho	Near Sinker Creek Idaho, 11 persons of the last wagon train of the year were killed by Indians and several others were subsequently killed. Some that escaped the initial massacre starved to death.	11+ (settlers)	
1861		Horse Canyon Massacre	California	White settlers and Indian allies attacked a Wailaki village in Horse Canyon (Round Valley, California), killing up to 240 Wailakis.	240	
1861	February	Bascom affair	Arizona	Lt. George Nicholas Bascom incorrectly believed Chiricahua Apache had kidnapped a twelve-year-old boy. Boscom tried to imprison their leader Cochise during a meeting. Cochise escaped, however others were captured. Two days later, Cochise captured and killed nine Mexicans. Three Americans who were also captured as hostages for negotiations, but they were killed after negotiations failed. Six of the captive Apache were later hung, including Cochise's brother and nephews.	12 (Mexicans/Americans) + 6 (Apache)	
1861-1863		Cookes Canyon Massacres	New Mexico	Apaches massacred as many as 100 Americans and Mexicans in Cooke's Canyon, New Mexico between 1861 and 1863.	100 (Americans and Mexicans)	
1861	September 21	Fort Fauntleroy Massacre	New Mexico	Soldiers massacred between 12 and 20 Navajos at Fort Fauntleroy, following a dispute over a horse race.	12–20	
1862		Upper Station Massacre	California	California settlers killed at least 20 Wailakis in Round Valley, California.	20	
1862		Big Antelope Creek Massacre	California	California settlers led by notorious Indian hunter Hi Good launched a dawn attack on a Yana village, massacring about 25 Indians.	25	
1862	August	Kowonk Massacre	California	A posse of 25 California settlers killed 45 Konkow Indians on their reservation in Round Valley, California.	45	
1862	August–September	Dakota War of 1862	Minnesota	As part of the U.S.-Dakota War, the Sioux killed as many as 800 white settlers and soldiers throughout Minnesota. Some 40,000 white settlers fled their homes on the frontier.	450–800 (settlers) 38 Sioux executed after the war	
1862	October	Massacre at Gallinas Springs	New Mexico	Soldiers under Capt. James Graydon's shot an aged Mescalero leader who was approaching with his hand up as a sign of peace. 11 other Mescaleros were also killed, including a woman.	12	
1862	October 24	Tonkawa Massacre	Oklahoma	During the U.S. Civil War, a detachment of irregular Union Indians, mainly Kickapoo, Lenape and Shawnee, accompanied by Caddo allies, attempted to destroy the Tonkawa tribe in Indian Territory. They killed 240 out of 390 Tonkawa, leaving only 150 survivors.	240	
1863	January 29	Bear River Massacre	Idaho	Col. Patrick Connor led a United States Army regiment killing up to 280 Shoshone men, women and children near Preston, Idaho. 21 US soldiers were also killed in the fight.	246–280 (including warriors)	
1863	April 19	Keyesville Massacre	California	American militia and members of the California cavalry, under the command of Captain Moses A. McLaughlin, killed 35 Tübatulabal men in Kern County, California.	35	
1863	May 3	Swamp Cedars Massacre	Nevada	Cavalry company led by Captain S. P. Smith, under orders of Colonel Patrick Connor of Fort Ruby, massacred 24 Goshute in their sleep on May 3 and 5 more the next day, followed by a massacre of 23 Indians in the Swamp Cedars of Spring Valley.	52	
1863–1865		Mowry massacres	Arizona	16 settlers were killed in a series of Indian raids at Mowry, Arizona Territory	16 (settlers)	
1864		Cottonwood	California	20 Yanas of both sexes were killed by white settlers in the town of Cottonwood, California.	20	
1864		Massacre at Bloody Tanks	Arizona	A group of white settlers led by King S. Woolsey killed 19 Apaches at a "peace parley".	19	
1864		Oak Run Massacre	California	California settlers massacred 300 Yana Indians who had gathered near the head of Oak Run, California for a spiritual ceremony.	300	
1864		Skull Valley Massacre	Arizona	A group of Yavapai families was lured into a trap and massacred by soldiers under Lt. Monteith in a valley west of Prescott, Arizona (Arizona). The place was named Skull Valley after the heads of the dead Indians left unburied.		
1864	November 29	Sand Creek Massacre	Colorado	Members of the Colorado Militia, in retaliation for theft and violence by Cheyenne Indians against settlers, attacked a village of Cheyenne, killing up to 600 men, women and children at Sand Creek in Kiowa County.	70–600	
1865	January 14	American Ranch Massacre	Colorado	During the Colorado War, Cheyenne and Sioux warriors attacked a ranch near present-day Sterling, Colorado where they killed all of the male settlers and took three captives, one of whom was later killed.	8 (settlers)	
1865	March 14	Mud Lake Massacre	Nevada	US troops under Captain Wells attacked a Paiute camp near Winnemucca Lake, killing 32 Indians. One soldier was slightly wounded during the attack.	32 (including warriors)	
1865	July 18	The Squaw Fight/The Grass Valley Massacre	Utah	While searching for Antonga Black Hawk, the Mormon militia came upon a band of Ute Indians. Thinking they were part of Black Hawk's band, they attacked them. They killed 10 men and took the women and children captive. After the women and children tried to escape, the militia shot them too.	10 men + unknown women and children	
1865		Owens Lake Massacre	California	Following the murder of Mrs. McGuire and her son at Haiwai Meadows, White vigilantes tracked the attackers from the meadows to a Paiute camp on Owens Lake in California. They attacked it killing about 40 men, women and children.	40	
1865		Three Knolls Massacre	California	White settlers massacred a Yana community at Three Knolls on the Mill Creek, California.		
1865	September 12	Thacker Pass Massacre	Nevada	Led by Capt. Payne and Lt. Littlefield, the 1st Nevada Cavalry murdered at least 31 Paiute men, women, and children.	31+	
1865	September	Bloody Point Massacre	Oregon	A wagon train of 65 settlers was massacred by Modoc Indians near Lake Tule in Oregon. One man survived and alerted the Oregon militia who buried the bodies.	65 (settlers)	
1866	April 21	Circleville Massacre	Utah	Mormon militiamen killed 16 Paiute men and women at Circleville, Utah. 6 men were shot, allegedly while trying to escape. The others (3 men and 7 women) had their throats cut. 4 small children were spared.	16	
1867		Aquarius Mountains	Arizona	Yavapai County Rangers killed 23 Indians (men, women and children) in the southern Aquarius Mountains, Arizona.	23	
1868		Campo Seco	California	A posse of white settlers massacred 33 Yahis in a cave north of Mill Creek, California.	33	
1868	September 24	Massacre at La Paz	Arizona	A group of teamsters attacked a sleeping Yavapai camp in the outskirts of La Paz, Arizona, killing 15 Indians.	15	
1868	November 27	Washita Massacre (Battle of Washita River)	Oklahoma	During the American Indian Wars, Lt. Col. G.A.Custer's 7th U.S. Cavalry attacked a village of sleeping Cheyenne led by Black Kettle. Custer reported 103 – later revised to 140 – warriors, "some" women and "few" children killed, and 53 women and children taken hostage. Other casualty estimates by cavalry members, scouts and Indians vary widely, with the number of men killed ranging as low as 11 and the numbers of women and children ranging as high as 75 and as low as 17. Before returning to their base, the cavalry killed several hundred Indian ponies and burned the village. 21 US soldiers were also killed.	17–75	
1870	January 23	Marias Massacre	Montana	US troops killed 173 Piegan, mainly women, children and the elderly after being led to the wrong camp by a soldier who wanted to protect his Indian wife's family.	173–217	
1871		Kingsley Cave Massacre	California	4 settlers killed 30 Yahi Indians in Tehama County, California about two miles from Wild Horse Corral in the Ishi Wilderness. It is estimated that this massacre left only 15 members of the Yahi tribe alive	30	
1871	April 30	Camp Grant Massacre	Arizona	Led by the ex-Mayor of Tucson, William Oury, eight Americans, 48 Mexicans and more than 100 allied Pima attacked Apache men, women and children at Camp Grant, Arizona Territory killing 144, with 1 survivor at scene and 29 children sold to slavery. All but eight of the dead were Apache women or children.	144	
1871	May 5	Salt Creek massacre	Texas	Kiowa warriors attacked a corn wagon train, killing and mutilating seven of the wagoneer's bodies. Three of the attack leaders were later arrested at Fort Sill: Satanta, Satank, and Ado-ete. Satank was later killed during an escape attempt, while the other two were convicted of murder.	7 (settlers)	
1871	November 5	Wickenburg massacre	Arizona	Indians attacked an Arizona stagecoach, killing the driver and his five passengers, leaving two wounded survivors.	6 (settlers)	
1872	December 28	Skeleton Cave Massacre	Arizona	U.S. troops and Indian scouts killed 76 Yavapai Indians men, women and children in a remote cave in Arizona's Salt River Canyon.	76	
1873	June 1	Cypress Hills Massacre	Saskatchewan	Following a dispute over stolen horses, American wolfers killed approximately 20 Nakoda in Saskatchewan.	20	
1873	August 5	Massacre Canyon	Nebraska	A large Oglala/Brulé Sioux war party, numbering over 1,500 warriors led by Two Strike, Little Wound, and Spotted Tail attacked a band of Pawnee during their summer buffalo hunt, killing more than 150 Pawnees, including 102 women and children. Some the dead were mutilated and set on fire.	156–173 (including warriors)	
1874	August 24	Lone Tree Massacre	Kansas	Surveyors under Captain Oliver Francis Short were ambushed by a group of 25 Cheyenne, near the lone Cottonwood tree by the Crooked Creek, near present-day Meade Kansas.	7	
1875	April	Sappa Creek Massacre	Kansas	Soldiers under Lt Austin Henly trapped a group of 27 Cheyenne, (19 men, 8 women and children) on the Sappa Creek, in Kansas and killed them all.	27	
1877	August 8	Battle of the Big Hole	Montana	US troops under Colonel John Gibbon attacked a Nez Perce encampment on the North fork of the Big Hole river in Montana Territory during the Nez Perce War. They killed 70 to 90 including 33 warriors before being repulsed by the Indians. 31 US soldiers were killed.	70–90 (33 warriors)	
1879	January 9–21	Fort Robinson Massacre	Nebraska	Northern Cheyenne under Dull Knife attempted to escape from confinement in Fort Robinson, Nebraska; U.S. Army forces hunted them down, killing between 64 and 77 of them. The remains of those killed were repatriated in 1994. 12 U.S. soldiers were also killed.	64–77 (including warriors)	
1879	September 30	Meeker Massacre	Colorado	In the beginning of the Ute War, the Ute killed the US Indian Agent Nathan Meeker and 10 others. They also attacked a military unit, killing 13 and wounding 43.	11	
1880	April 28	Alma Massacre	New Mexico	The Apache chief Victorio led warriors in an attack on settlers at Alma, New Mexico. On December 19, 1885, the Apache killed an officer and four enlisted men of the 8th Cavalry Regiment near Alma.	35–41 (settlers)	
1882	April 16	Stephens Ranch massacre	Arizona	The Apache chief Geronimo asked for food at a sheep herder camp near Bryce, Arizona. After promising the sheep herders they would not be harmed, Geronimo and his band were fed. Geronimo then ordered the family and sheep herders to be killed.	16+ (settlers)	
1885	April 2	Frog Lake Massacre	Frog Lake, Alberta	During the Cree uprising in the North-West Rebellion, Cree men, Led by Wandering Spirit, killed 9 officials, clergy and settlers in the small settlement of Frog Lake in the District of Saskatchewan.	9 (settlers)	
1885	June 19	Beaver Creek Massacre	Colorado	White cattlemen killed six Ute Mountain Utes at a camp on Beaver Creek, about 16 miles north of Dolores in present Montezuma County.	6	
1889	February 14 or 15	Jim Jumper massacre	Florida	Jim Jumper, a biracial-Seminole, killed at least six Seminoles when his request to marry a Seminole woman was refused. Jumper was then killed by another Seminole.	7 or more	
1890	December 10	Buffalo Gap Massacre	South Dakota	Several wagonloads of Sioux were killed by South Dakota Home Guard militiamen near French Creek, South Dakota, while visiting a white friend in Buffalo Gap.		
1890	December 16	Strong Hold	South Dakota	South Dakota Home Guard militiamen ambushed and massacred 75 Sioux at the Stronghold, in the northern portion of Pine Ridge Indian Reservation.	75	
1890	December 29	Wounded Knee Massacre	South Dakota	Members of the U.S. 7th Cavalry attacked and killed between 130 and 250 Sioux men, women and children at Wounded Knee, South Dakota.	130–250	
1897	Unknown	Swamp Cedars Massacre of 1897	Nevada	A group of vigilantes targeted a Shoshone gathering, killing all in attendance, mainly women, children, and elders, except two young girls.		
1911	January 19	Last Massacre	Nevada	A group of Shoshone killed four ranchers in Washoe County, Nevada. On February 26, 1911, an American posse killed eight of the Shoshone suspects and captured four children from the band.	5 (4 ranchers & 1 policeman) + 8 (Indians)	
1915	December 2	Massacre of San Pedro de la Cueva	Sonora, Mexico	During the Mexican Revolution, on the morning of December 2, 1915, after the disastrous campaign of his army in the state of Sonora, Pancho Villa angrily arrived in San Pedro de la Cueva and ordered the mass execution of all the residents of the town. He blamed them for the deaths of five of his men. An outpost under the command of one of her colonels, Margarito Orozco, had apprehended 300 men, women and children, training them in front of the church. When Villa ordered his officers to initiate the executions, Colonel Macario Bracamontes, who was active in his ranks, convinced him to spare the lives of a hundred women and children. Immediately, the rest of the prisoners, who numbered 112 men, were lined up against one of the walls of the Catholic church to be put under arms; at the beginning of the executions, the village priest, Andrés A. Flores Quesney, pleaded three times for the lives of the condemned, including his father, but Villa ended up killing him with a shot. The killing continued.	Around 91 people between residents, Opatas, foreigners (4) and Chinese (3)	

== See also ==
- American Indian Wars
- Canadian genocide of Indigenous peoples
- Colonialism and genocide
- Genocide of indigenous peoples
- Genocides in history (1490 to 1914)
- History of Native Americans in the United States
- Indigenous survival against colonization
- List of battles won by Indigenous peoples of the Americas
- List of conflicts in North America
- List of conflicts in the United States
- List of ethnic cleansing campaigns
- List of genocides
- List of massacres in Canada
- List of massacres in the United States
- Mass racial violence in the United States
- Native American genocide in the United States
- Population history of the indigenous peoples of the Americas
- Racism against Native Americans in the United States
- Racism in Canada#Indigenous peoples
- Racism in the United States#Native Americans

== Bibliography ==
- Anderson, Gary C., The Conquest of Texas: Ethnic cleansing in the Promised Land, 1820–1875, University of Oklahoma Press, 2005, 544 pages, ISBN 978-0-89096-867-3
- Baumgardner, Frank, Killing for Land in Early California – Indian Blood at Round Valley, Algora Publishing, 2006, 312 pages, ISBN 978-0-87586-364-1
- Braatz, Timothy, Surviving conquest: a history of the Yavapai peoples, University of Nebraska Press, 2003, 336 pages, ISBN 978-0-8032-2242-7
- Heizer, Robert F., The Destruction of California Indians, University of Nebraska Press, Lincoln and London, 1993, 321 pages, ISBN 978-0-8032-7262-0
- Gallay, Alan, The Indian Slave Trade: The rise of the English Empire in the American South, Yale University Press, 2003, 464 pages, ISBN 978-0-300-10193-5
- Gonzalez, Mario and Cook-Lynn, Elizabeth, The Politics of Hallowed Ground: Wounded Knee and the Struggle for Indian Sovereignty, University of Illinois Press, 1998, 448 pages, ISBN 978-0-25206-669-6
- Hamalainen, Pekka, The Comanche Empire, Yale University Press, 2008, 512 pages, ISBN 978-0-30012-654-9
- Himmel, Kelly F., The Conquest of the Karankawas and the Tonkawas, 1821–1859, TAMU Press, 1999, 216 pages, ISBN 978-0-89096-867-3
- Kiernan, Ben, "Blood and Soil: a World History of Genocide and Massacre from Sparta to Darfur", Yale University Press, 2007, 768 pages, ISBN 978-0-300-10098-3
- Kinbacher, Kurt E. "Contested Events and Conflicting Meanings: Mari Sandoz and the Sappa Creek Cheyenne Massacre of 1875." Great Plains Quarterly (2016): 309–326.
- Konstantin, Phil, This Day in North American Indian History: Events in the History of North America's Native Peoples, Da Capo Press, 2002, 480 pages, ISBN 978-0-306-81170-8
- Madley, Benjamin, Tactics of Nineteenth Century Colonial Massacre: Tasmania, California and Beyond in Philips G. Dwyer and Lyndall Ryan, eds., Theatres of Violence: Massacres, Mass Killing and Atrocity Throughout History, Berghan Books, 2012, 350 pages, ISBN 978-0-85745-299-3
- Madley, Benjamin, The Genocide of California's Yana Indians in Samuel Totten and Williams S. Parsons, eds., Centuries of Genocide: Essays and Eyewitness Accounts, Routledge, 2012, pp. 16–53, 611 pages, ISBN 978-0-415871-921
- Madley, Benjamin, An American Genocide, The United States and the California Catastrophe, 1846–1873, Yale University Press, 2016, 692 pages, ISBN 978-0-300-18136-4
- Michno, Gregory F., Encyclopedia of Indian Wars: Western Battles and Skirmishes 1850–1890, Mountain Press Publishing Co., 2003, 448 pages, ISBN 978-0-87842-468-9
- Norton, Jack, "Genocide in Northwestern California : when our worlds cried", Indian Historian Press, San Francisco, 1979, ISBN 0-913436-26-2
- Reynolds, W.R., The Cherokee Struggle to Maintain Identity in the 17th and 18th Centuries, McFarland, 2015, 436 pages, ISBN 978-0-78647-317-5
- Scheper-Hughes, Nancy, Violence in War and Peace: An Anthology, Wiley-Blackwell, 2003, 512 pages, ISBN 978-0-631-22349-8
- Schwartz, E. A, The Rogue River Indian War and its aftermath, 1850–1980, University of Oklahoma Press, 1997, ISBN 978-0-8061-2906-8
- Sipe, C. Hale, The Indian wars of Pennsylvania: An account of the Indian events, in Pennsylvania, of the French and Indian War, Pontiac's War, Lord Dunmore's War, the Revolutionary War and the Indian Uprising from 1789 to 1795. Tragedies of the Pennsylvania frontier, Telegraph Press, 1929. 793 pages. ISBN 978-5871748480
- Thornton, Russell, "American Indian Holocaust and Survival: a Population History since 1492", University of Oklahoma Press, 1990, 312 pages, ISBN 978-0-8061-2220-5
- Thrapp, Dan, "The Conquest of Apacheria", University of Oklahoma Press, 1975, 422 pages, ISBN 978-0-8061-1286-2
