= Richard P. Havens, 1983 =

Studio album by Richie Havens
- Released: December 7, 1968 (US) / May 1969 (UK)
- Recorded: 1968
- Studios: RKO, New York City
- Genre: Folk rock
- Label: Verve
- Producers: John Court, Richie Havens, Elliot Mazer, Mark Roth

Richie Havens chronology
Something Else Again (1968)	Richard P. Havens, 1983 (1968)	Stonehenge (1970)

Richard P. Havens, 1983 is a 1968 double album set by folk rock musician Richie Havens featuring a combination of studio recordings and live material recorded in concert during July 1968. The album combined original material with several of the covers for which Havens was known. Notable songs include the singles "Stop Pushing and Pulling Me" and "Indian Rope Man", the latter of which has been multiply covered under its own name and in retooled identity as "African Herbsman." The genre-bending album was critically and commercially well-received, reaching #80 on the Billboard "Pop Albums" chart. Initially released on the Verve label, it has been reissued multiple times in various formats, including by Verve subsidiary Verver Forecast/PolyGram and Australian label Raven Records. It has also been compiled with albums Mixed Bag and Something Else Again in multi-cd set Flyin' Bird: The Verve Forecast Years on the Hip-O Select/Universal label.

== Background ==
Richard P. Havens, 1983 compiles a number of studio tracks with live material recorded for a concert in July 1968. Musically, it displays Havens' multi-instrumental approach and demonstrates the influence of several genres, including folk rock, world music and folk blues. As critic Richie Unterberger described it in 2003's Eight Miles High, the album "worked towards a folk-rock-world-music fusion of sorts, though one grounded in the sort of bluesy folk [Havens]...and others had pioneered in the Village back in the early 60s." Producer Elliott Mazer said that Havens' method of playing presented some difficulties to the many musicians who joined him, as "Richie was not very interested in learning the chords for the songs" but "made up his own".

Described as a concept album, this was Havens' first experience co-producing one of his albums. Additional production on the album was provided by Mazer and Mark Roth, while John Court lent production to the song "Indian Rope Man." For the cover, Roth photographed Havens in infrared.

The album title is a reference to George Orwell's novel Nineteen Eighty-Four; Havens meant to imply that "there was still time, brother, but not much."

== Music and reception ==
Professional ratings
Review scores
Source	Rating
AllMusic	3/5 stars

The album reached No. 80 on the Billboard Pop Albums chart and was critically well received. 2004's Rip It Up: The Black Experience in Rock'n'Roll indicates that this album, along with Havens' Mixed Bag and Alarm Clock, "should be considered staples of the rock canon." The Rough Guide to Rock praises it as "an excellent mix of originals and covers, with a darker, brooding feel." In a more modest assessment, Unterberger's review in Allmusic summarizes, "As with many double albums, it perhaps could have used some pruning, although in general it was a worthy expansion of his sound as captured on record."

The album includes several of the covers for which Havens is known, particularly the "imaginative covers" of Beatles and Bob Dylan which Unterberger indicated "he was able to recast as his own". However, while Rough Guide suggested that the album bears "witness to Havens' compelling ability as a live performer", Unterberger discerned on this particular recording "an over reliance on Beatles covers" and felt "the live stuff on side four...seems like an afterthought to push the set to double-LP length."

Singles released from the album include "Stop Pulling and Pushing Me", the B side of a cover of "Rocky Raccoon", in July 1969, and "Indian Rope Man", which was released twice in May 1969: as an "A" side with "Just Above My Hobby Horses Head" and a "B" side with Beatles' cover "Lady Madonna." "Indian Rope Man" has proved enduring, with multiple covers by Brian Auger, Julie Driscoll and Phaze, among others. It was also retooled and retitled as "African Herbsman", under which title it was performed by Bob Marley.

== Track listing ==
Except where otherwise noted, all tracks composed by Richie Havens.

=== Side one ===
1. "Stop Pulling and Pushing Me" – 1:48
2. "For Haven's Sake" – 7:01
3. "Strawberry Fields Forever" (John Lennon, Paul McCartney) – 3:37
4. "What More Can I Say John?" – 4:38

=== Side two ===
1. "I Pity the Poor Immigrant" (Bob Dylan) – 3:09
2. "Lady Madonna" (John Lennon, Paul McCartney) – 1:57
3. "Priests" (Leonard Cohen) – 5:15
4. "Indian Rope Man" (Havens, Joe Price, Mark Roth) – 3:02
5. "Cautiously" (Maurey Haydn) – 4:00

=== Side three ===
1. "Just Above My Hobby Horse's Head" (Havens, Mark Roth) – 2:58
2. "She's Leaving Home" (John Lennon, Paul McCartney) – 4:05
3. "Putting out the Vibration, and Hoping It Comes Home" (Havens, Mark Roth) – 2:53
4. "The Parable of Ramon" (live) (Havens, Mark Roth) – 7:56

=== Side four ===
1. "With a Little Help from My Friends" (live) (John Lennon, Paul McCartney) – 5:19
2. "Wear Your Love Like Heaven" (live) (Donovan Leitch) – 4:55
3. "Run, Shaker Life"/"Do You Feel Good?" (live) (arranged & adapted by Havens/Havens) – 4:04/4:52

=== Bonus CD tracks (not appearing on the original double album) ===
1. "Handsome Johnny" (Lou Gossett, Jr., Havens) – 3:54
2. "No Opportunity Necessary, No Experience Needed" – 2:58

== Personnel ==
Performance

- Warren Bernhardt – keyboards, clavinet
- Brad Campbell – bass
- Bob Chase – percussion
- Diane Comins – harmonica, harp
- Jim Fairs – bass
- Richie Havens – acoustic guitar, electric guitar, sitar, vocals, tamboura, handclapping, ondioline
- Charles Howall – vocals
- Carol Hunter – bass
- Teddy Irwin – guitar
- Bruce Langhorne – guitar
- Ken Lauber – keyboards
- Donald McDonald – drums
- Arnie Moore – bass
- Weldon Myrick – steel guitar
- John Ord – organ, piano, celeste, keyboards
- Skip Prokop – drums
- Charlie Smalls – keyboard, piano
- Jeremy Steig – flute
- Stephen Stills – bass
- Collin Walcott – sitar, tabla
- Paul "Dino" Williams – guitar
- Daniel Ben Zebulon – drums

Production

- Warren Barnett – mastering
- Bill Blachly – engineer
- Carter Collins – conductor
- John Court – producer
- Richie Havens – arranger, producer
- Wally Heider – engineer
- Al Manger – engineer
- Elliot Mazer – producer
- Ian McFarlane – release preparation
- Kevin Mueller – release preparation
- Terry Reilly – liner notes
- Mark Roth – producer, photography, cover design
- Peter Shillito – concept, release preparation

== Charts ==
Chart	Peak
U.S. Billboard Pop Albums	80

== Releases ==
The album was initially released on vinyl in 1968 on Verve Forecast Records. It was re-released as a compact disc in 1990 on Verve/PolyGram. In 2004, Richard P. Havens, 1983 was combined with two other Havens albums on a Hip-O Select double CD titled Flyin' Bird: The Verve Forecast Years.

year	format	label	catalog #
1968	LP	Verve Forecast	FTS-3047-2
1970	LP	MGM	SE-4700-2
1990	CD	Verve/PolyGram	835 212
2004	2CD	Hip-O Select/Universal	986 240
2008	CD	Raven	274
