= On Stage =

On Stage may refer to:

== Music ==
- Jim Reeves on Stage, a 1968 live album by Jim Reeves
- On Stage (Richie Havens album), a 1972 live album by Richie Havens
- Neil Sedaka On Stage, a 1974 live album by Neil Sedaka
- On Stage (EP), a 1979 EP by Kate Bush
- On Stage (Gerald Wilson album), a 1965 album by the Gerald Wilson Orchestra
- Hep Stars on Stage, a 1965 album by the Hep Stars, commonly referred to as On Stage
- On Stage (Elvis Presley album), a 1970 live album by Elvis Presley
- On Stage (Loggins and Messina album), a 1974 live album by Loggins and Messina
- On Stage (Rainbow album), a 1977 double live album by Rainbow
- On Stage (The Exploited album), a 1981 album by The Exploited
- "On the Stage", the English version of "Butai ni Tatte", a 2024 song by Yoasobi

== Other ==
- On Stage, a comic strip later retitled Mary Perkins, On Stage
- On Stage, a radio anthology series that aired in the 1950s
- On Stage, a television program about New York City theatre; airs on NY1
