= Handsome Johnny =

Handsome Johnny may refer to,

- Handsome Johnny, a name used by American mobster John Roselli (1905–1976)
- "Handsome Johnny" (song), a song by Richie Havens
- Handsome Johnny, a name used by Ivar (wrestler)
