= Simple Things =

Simple Things may refer to:

== Films and television ==
- Simple Things (film) (Prosty'e veshchi), a 2007 Russian film
- The Simple Things, a 1953 animated Mickey Mouse short

== Music ==
Albums

- Simple Things (Carole King album), 1977
- Simple Things (Zero 7 album), 2001
- Simple Things (Amy Grant album), 2003
- Simple Things (CAS album), 2013 a charity compilation album
- Simple Things (Richie Havens album), 1987

Songs

- "Simple Things" (Amy Grant song), 2003
- "Simple Things" (Jim Brickman song), 2001
- "Simple Things", Alexander Cardinale feat. Christina Perri song, 2019
- "Simple Things", a song written and produced by Armin van Buuren and Justine Suissa
- "Simple Things", a song by Dirty Vegas
- "Simple Things", song by Miguel from the deluxe edition of his 2015 album Wildheart
- "Simple Things", a song by Rodney Atkins from his 2009 album It's America
- "Simple Things", a song by Usher from his 2004 album Confessions
- "Simple Things", a song by the Tedeschi Trucks Band from their 2011 album Revelator
- "Simple Things", a song by Teddy Swims from his 2022 EP Tough Love
- "Simple Things", a song by Ne-Yo from his 2026 album Highway 79
- "The Simple Things (Something Emotional)", song by Vanessa Amorosi
- "The Simple Things", a Hey Arnold! song written by Craig Bartlett and Steve Viksten and sung by Randy Travis

== Other ==
- "Simple things should be simple, complex things should be possible" - a famous quote by computer scientist Alan Kay
