= Cuts to the Chase =

Studio album by Richie Havens
- Released: 1994
- Genre: Folk, rock
- Label: Forward

Richie Havens chronology
Résumé: The Best of Richie Havens (1993)	Cuts to the Chase (1994)	Classics (1995)

Cuts to the Chase is an album by the American musician Richie Havens, released in 1994. It was distributed by Rhino Records.

Havens intended to support the album by playing the Bethel '94 Woodstock reunion. After it was canceled, Havens played shows with, among others, Pete Seeger and Don McLean, in addition to touring the United Kingdom. "Old Love" was a minor radio hit.

== Production ==
Havens added more rock elements to his folk sound. The album contains two parts. The first seven songs are listed under "The Declaration"; the remaining six fall under "Independence". "Old Love" is a cover of the Eric Clapton song. "Comin' Back to Me" is a version of the Jefferson Airplane song; Havens had wanted to record it for decades. "They Dance Alone" was written by Sting. "Darkness, Darkness" was composed by Jesse Colin Young. The only Havens-penned song on the album, "Young Boy", encourages urban young people to advocate for change. Billy Perry played guitar on the album.

== Critical reception ==
Professional ratings
Review scores
Source	Rating
AllMusic	3/5 stars
Calgary Herald	C
Chicago Tribune	3/4 stars
MusicHound Folk: The Essential Album Guide	3/5 stars

The Hartford Courant wrote that Havens's "guitar playing is enthusiastic and powerful and his lyric presentation often gives new shades of meanings to familiar songs." The Boston Globe concluded that "this is a fine new album that restores luster to his career and proves his voice is still among the most stately, dignified vehicles in the field." The Calgary Herald opined: "While the occasional song rises above the haze of decades passed ... Havens—even when backed by a band—remains, alas, more of a relic rather than a singer relevant to today."

The Chicago Tribune stated that "Havens' heartfelt, distinctive vocal style and forceful guitar playing serve him well throughout." The St. Petersburg Times deemed the album "a complex, compelling work that breaks away from the traditional, folk-heavy Havens." The Christian Science Monitor called Cuts to the Chase "his best work in years," praising the "deep, sandpaper voice [and] propulsive guitar strumming."

== Track listing ==
No.	Title	Length
1.	"Lives in the Balance"
2.	"They Dance Alone"
3.	"My Father's Shoes"
4.	"Darkness, Darkness"
5.	"The Hawk"
6.	"Young Boy"
7.	"The Times They Are a-Changin'"
8.	"Fade to Blue"
9.	"Intro/Old Love"
10.	"How the Nights Can Fly"
11.	"Comin' Back to Me"
12.	"Don't Pass It Up"
13.	"At a Glance"
