= Mixed Bag =

Studio album by Richie Havens
- Released: December 1966
- Recorded: July 7, September 12 & 20, 1966
- Length: 37:54
- Label: Verve
- Producer: John Court

Richie Havens chronology
| Mixed Bag (1966) | Something Else Again (1968) |

Professional ratings
Review scores
| Source | Rating |
|---|---|
| AllMusic | 4.5/5 stars |
| The Encyclopedia of Popular Music | 4/5 stars |
| The Great Rock Discography | 8/10 |
| MusicHound Folk | 3.5/5 stars |
| Rolling Stone | 3.5/5 stars |

Mixed Bag is the debut studio album by Richie Havens, released in December 1966. Although it was Havens' first album release, Douglas Records later issued two unauthorized albums of material that had been recorded prior to the Mixed Bag recording sessions—Electric Havens (1968) and Richie Havens' Record (1969). Mixed Bag was released after Havens signed on with manager Albert Grossman and was released on Verve Folkways, a new folk music imprint of Verve Records.

Mixed Bag is frequently cited as the singer's best work, and was his first album to appear on Billboard's charts (appearing on both the jazz and pop charts). The recording was the first to introduce a wider audience to Havens's rich baritone vocals and the full-sound of Havens's distinct guitar style (thumb-chorded and played in open E tuning). Electric Havens and Mixed Bag were two of the records reported among the personal collection of Havens' one-time Greenwich Village buddy, Jimi Hendrix.

== Track listing ==
Side one

1. "High Flyin' Bird" (Billy Edd Wheeler) – 3:35
2. "I Can't Make It Anymore" (Gordon Lightfoot) – 2:48
3. "Morning, Morning" (Tuli Kupferberg) – 2:17
4. "Adam" (Havens) – 3:34
5. "Follow" (Jerry Merrick) – 6:22

Side two

1. "Three Day Eternity" (Havens) – 2:15
2. "Sandy" (Jean Pierre Cousineau) – 3:12
3. "Handsome Johnny" (Louis Gossett Jr., Havens) – 3:53
4. "San Francisco Bay Blues" (Jesse Fuller) – 2:30
5. "Just Like a Woman" (Bob Dylan) – 4:46
6. "Eleanor Rigby" (John Lennon, Paul McCartney) – 2:42

== Personnel ==
- Richie Havens – guitar, sitar, vocals
- Harvey Brooks – bass
- Paul Harris – organ, piano, keyboards
- Bill LaVorgna – drums
- Howard Collins – guitar
- Joe Price – tabla on "Adam"
- Paul "Dino" Williams – acoustic guitar on "Follow"

Technical personnel

- Cover photo – Barry Feinstein
- Director of engineering – Val Valentin
- Produced by Groscourt Productions, Inc.
- Production Supervisor – Jerry Schoenbaum
- Arranged by Bruce Langhorne for "I Can't Make It Anymore"
- Arranged by Felix Pappalardi for "Morning, Morning"
- Mastered for Compact Disc by Dennis M. Drake at PolyGram Studios

== Releases ==
The album was initially released on vinyl in 1966 on Verve Folkways, a newly formed folk section at the Verve division of MGM Records. It was re-released as a CD in 1993 on PolyGram Records. In 2004, Mixed Bag was combined with two other Havens albums on a double CD titled Flyin' Bird: The Verve Forecast Years, a limited-edition release of 3,000 individually numbered copies.

| year | format | label | catalog # |
|---|---|---|---|
| 1966 | LP | Verve Folkways | FTS-3006 |
| 1967 | LP | Verve/PolyGram | 2317 002 |
| 1967 | | Polydor/PolyGram | 835 210 |
| 1970 | LP | MGM | SE 4698 |
| | CD | Verve/PolyGram | 835 210 |
| 1993 | CD | Verve/PolyGram | |
| 2004 | 2CD | Verve/Hip-O Select/Universal | |
