= Alarm Clock (album) =

Studio album by Richie Havens
- Released: 1971
- Genre: Folk
- Label: Stormy Forest/MGM
- Producers: Richie Havens, Mark Roth

Richie Havens chronology
Stonehenge (1970)	Alarm Clock (1971)	The Great Blind Degree (1971)

Professional ratings
Review scores
Source	Rating
AllMusic	4/5 stars
The Encyclopedia of Popular Music	3/5 stars
MusicHound Folk: The Essential Album Guide	3/5 stars
The Rolling Stone Album Guide	3/5 stars

Alarm Clock is an album by the folk rock musician Richie Havens. It was released in 1971 by Stormy Forest. It is his highest-charting album, reaching number 29 on the Billboard Top 200 in the United States. The opening track, a live cover of the Beatles' "Here Comes the Sun", reached number 16.

== Track listing ==
Except where otherwise noted, all tracks composed by Richie Havens and Mark Roth. Note that running times are listed from the original LP, and may vary slightly for other formats.

1. "Here Comes the Sun" (George Harrison) – 3:43
2. "To Give All Your Love Away" – 2:58
3. "Younger Men Grow Older" – 4:05
4. "Girls Don't Run Away" (Havens) – 4:17
5. "End of the Seasons" (Havens, Roth, Bob Margouleff) – 3:38
6. "Some Will Wait" – 2:40
7. "Patient Lady" – 4:45
8. "Missing Train" – 4:55
9. "Alarm Clock" – 7:17

== Personnel ==
- Richie Havens - vocals (1–9), guitar (1–9), percussion (6–8), piano (9)
- Paul Williams - lead guitar (1–9), second lead guitar (9)
- Eric Oxendine - bass (1,2,4,6–9)
- Joe Price - conga drums (1)
- Bill Keith - steel guitar (1)
- Rick Derringer - electric guitar (2)
- Daniel Ben Zebulon - conga drums (2,4,6–9)
- Alan Hand - piano (2,4)
- Bill LaVorgna - drums (3,4)
- Dennis Persich - electric guitar (7)
- Buzz Linhardt - vibes (8)
- Warren Bernhardt - organ (8)
- Bill Shepherd - string arrangement (5)
