= Richie Havens =

American singer-songwriter and guitarist (1941–2013)

- Havens in 1999

Background information
- Born: Richard Pierce Havens; January 21, 1941; New York City, U.S.
- Died: April 22, 2013 (aged 72) Jersey City, New Jersey, U.S.
- Genres: Folk rock; funk; blues; soul
- Occupations: Musician; songwriter; actor
- Instruments: Vocals; guitar; sitar
- Years active: 1965–2012
- Labels: Douglas; Verve Forecast; MGM; A&M; Solar/Epic/SME; Rykodisc; Rhino
- Website: richiehavens.com

Richard Pierce Havens (January 21, 1941 – April 22, 2013) was an American singer-songwriter and guitarist. His music encompassed elements of folk, soul (both of which he frequently covered), and rhythm and blues. He had a rhythmic guitar style (often in open tunings). He was the opening act at Woodstock, sang many jingles for television commercials, and was also the voice of the GeoSafari toys.

== Early life ==
Born in Bedford–Stuyvesant in Brooklyn, Havens was the oldest of nine children. He was of Native American (Blackfoot) descent on his father's side and of the British West Indies on his mother's. His grandfather was Blackfoot of the Montana/South Dakota area.

Havens's grandfather and great-uncle joined Buffalo Bill's Wild West Show, moved to New York City thereafter, and settled on the Shinnecock Reservation on Long Island. Havens's grandfather married, then moved to Brooklyn.

As a youth, Havens began organizing his neighborhood friends into a street corner doo-wop group. At the age of 16, he was performing with the McCrea Gospel Singers.

== Career ==
=== Early career ===
At age 20, Havens left Brooklyn, seeking artistic stimulation in Greenwich Village in Manhattan. "I saw the Village as a place to escape to, in order to express yourself," he recalled. "I had first gone there during the beatnik days of the 1950s to perform poetry, then I drew portraits for two years and stayed up all night listening to folk music in the clubs. It took a while before I thought of picking up a guitar."

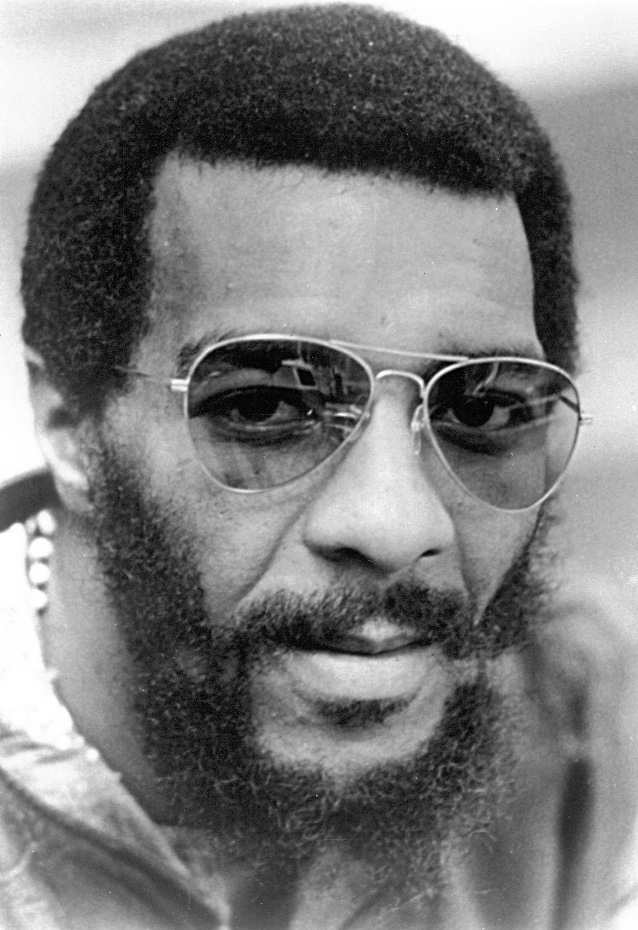
Publicity photo released in 1974 by his management at the William Morris Agency

Havens's solo performances quickly spread beyond the Village folk music circles. After cutting two records for Douglas Records, he signed on with Bob Dylan's manager Albert Grossman and landed a record deal with the Verve Folkways (later Verve Forecast) label. Verve released Mixed Bag in late 1966, which featured tracks such as "Handsome Johnny" (co-written by Havens and actor Louis Gossett Jr.), "Follow", and a cover of Bob Dylan's "Just Like a Woman". Havens released his first single, "No Opportunity Necessary", in 1967, which was later covered by Yes in their second album Time and a Word.

Something Else Again (1968) became his first album to hit the Billboard charts, and it pulled Mixed Bag back onto the charts. By 1969, he had released five albums. Two of those albums were unauthorized and were released by Douglas Records (or Douglas International): Electric Havens (released June 1, 1968) and Richie Havens Record (1969).

=== Woodstock and rise in fame ===
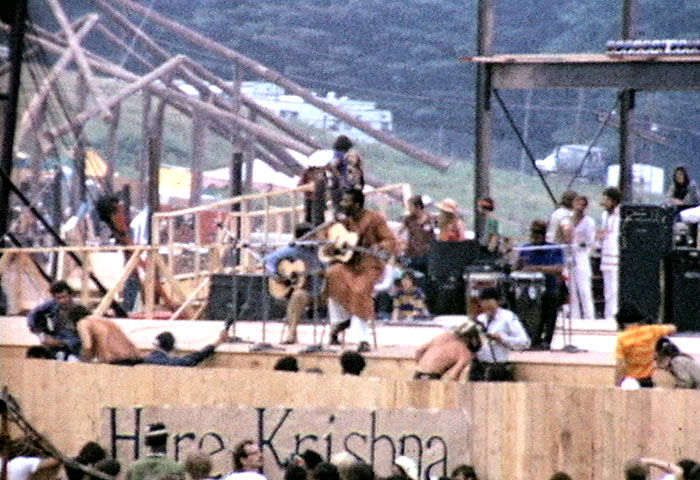
Havens playing at Woodstock Music Festival 1969

Havens's live performances earned widespread notice. His opening 1969 appearance at Woodstock, in a trio with Paul "Deano" Williams on guitar and singing backing vocals and Daniel Ben Zebulon on percussion, catapulted him into stardom and was a major turning point in his career. Despite Havens's recollection that he performed for nearly three hours, the actual recording and setlist reflect that he played about fifty minutes.

Havens continued playing because the musicians after him were delayed by traffic, including the originally scheduled opening act, Sweetwater. He concluded his set by riffing off the old spiritual "Motherless Child". In an interview with Cliff Smith, for Music-Room, Havens explained:

I'd already played every song I knew and I was stalling, asking for more guitar and mic, trying to think of something else to play—and then it just came to me... The establishment was foolish enough to give us all this freedom and we used it in every way we could.

The subsequent Woodstock movie release helped Havens reach a worldwide audience. He also appeared two weeks later at the Isle of Wight Festival, in late August 1969.

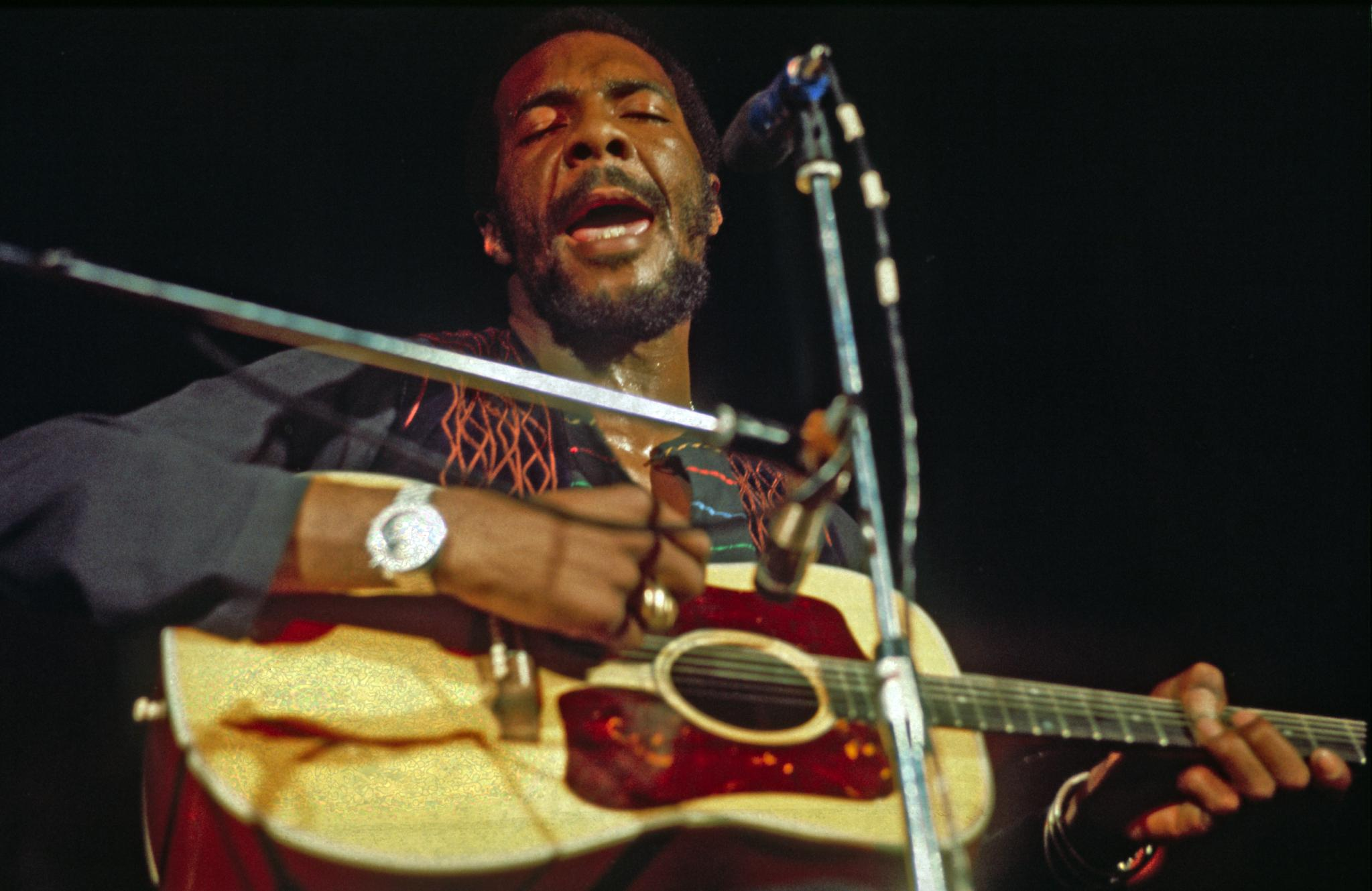
Havens performing in Hamburg, Germany, May 1972

Havens also began acting during the 1970s. He was featured in the original 1972 stage presentation of The Who's Tommy, as Othello in the 1974 film Catch My Soul, in Greased Lightning (1977) alongside Richard Pryor, and in Bob Dylan's Hearts of Fire (1987).

In July 1978, he was a featured performer at the Benefit Concert for The Longest Walk, an American Indian spiritual walk from Alcatraz to Washington, D.C. affirming treaty rights, as a result of legislation that had been introduced to abrogate Indian treaties.

=== Branching into other media ===
Havens made guest appearances on Sesame Street from 1974 to 1975. In 1978, together with Vietnam veteran and environmentalist Michael Sandlofer he initiated A Right to Live, an organisation aiming at awareness of the well-being of whales and other sea animals, including an animal shelter and museum in New York (City Island). The name of the initiative referred to the line "Everybody got a right to live", that he sang during his legendary opening set at the Woodstock Festival. He also continued to release music and tour during the 1980s and 1990s. He made advertisements for NBC, CBS and ABC, and commercials for Amtrak and for Coca-Cola. Havens also did corporate commercial work for Maxwell House Coffee and Folgers as well as sang "The Fabric of Our Lives" theme for the cotton industry. In 1982, he appeared at the UK's Glastonbury Festival, closing the show on the Sunday night. In the early 1980s, his interpretation of "Going Back to My Roots" became a modest hit in European clubs.

On June 22, 1990, Richie Havens played at a packed Yankee Stadium concert in honor of Nelson Mandela who had come to New York for three days after Mandela's release from the South African prison Robben Island. Other performers at the concert were Judy Collins, Tracy Chapman and Mighty Sparrow.

In 1993, Havens performed at the inauguration of President Bill Clinton. Among the selections was the "Cotton" song, made famous by a series of television commercials from the early 1990s. In 1999, Havens played at the Tibetan Freedom Concert for an audience of more than 100,000.

The release of 1993's Resume: The Best of Richie Havens, on Rhino Records, collected his late 1960s and early 1970s recordings.

Havens played a small role, as a character named Daze, in the film Street Hunter (1990), starring John Leguizamo. He played himself in "Rock of Ages", an episode of the TV sitcom Married... with Children (Season 7, Episode 9).

Havens was the 20th living recipient of the Peace Abbey Courage of Conscience Award, presented in Sherborn, Massachusetts, on April 12, 1991.

=== Final years ===
In 2000, Havens teamed with the electronic music duo Groove Armada for the retro 1970s-style song "Hands of Time". The song was featured on the soundtrack of the film Collateral; that song was also used in the films Domino, A Lot Like Love, Tell No One and in the Cold Case episodes "The Badlands" and "Street Money". Havens was also featured on "Little By Little" and "Healing" on the band's third album, Goodbye Country.

In 2000, he published They Can't Hide Us Anymore, an autobiography co-written with Steve Davidowitz. Havens maintained his status as a folk icon and continued to tour. In 2002 he sang, uncredited, Dylan's "The Times They Are a Changin'" in the TV series The West Wing (Season 4, Episode 7). Also in 2002, he released Wishing Well, followed by the 2004 album Grace of the Sun.

On February 15, 2003, Havens opened the unprecedented "The World Says No To War" in Iraq demonstration in New York City with his iconic "Freedom." As the U.S. stood on the precipice of a "Shock & Awe" attack on Iraq, tens of millions in more than 800 cities around the world marched against war, leading the New York Times to call these millions the "world's new superpower."

Havens playing at The Turning Point in Piermont, New York, January 4, 2009

On October 15, 2006, Havens was inducted into the Long Island Music Hall of Fame.

In 2007, Havens appeared as Old Man Arvin in the Todd Haynes film I'm Not There. In a front-porch jam scene, he is shown singing the Bob Dylan song "Tombstone Blues" with Marcus Carl Franklin and Tyrone Benskin. Havens's version of the song also appears on the I'm Not There soundtrack. On August 17, 2007, Richie Havens played Bethel Woods Center for the Arts, returning on the 38th Anniversary of Woodstock with Arlo Guthrie. In February 2008, Havens performed at The Jazz Café in London.

Havens was invited to perform at the 2008 Cannes Film Festival opening ceremony. He played "Freedom" at the request of the jury president Sean Penn. Havens also performed at the London, Ontario, Blues Festival in July 2008.

In March 2008, Havens released a new studio album, Nobody Left To Crown. The first single release was the country-tinged "The Key". On August 14, 2009, Richie returned for the 40th Anniversary of Woodstock to play the Bethel Woods Festival.

Havens appeared in the acclaimed 2009 film Soundtrack for a Revolution, which provided a general history of the modern Civil Rights Movement and featured modern artists performing many of the era's musical classics. In the film, Havens performed a haunting rendition of "Will the Circle Be Unbroken?"

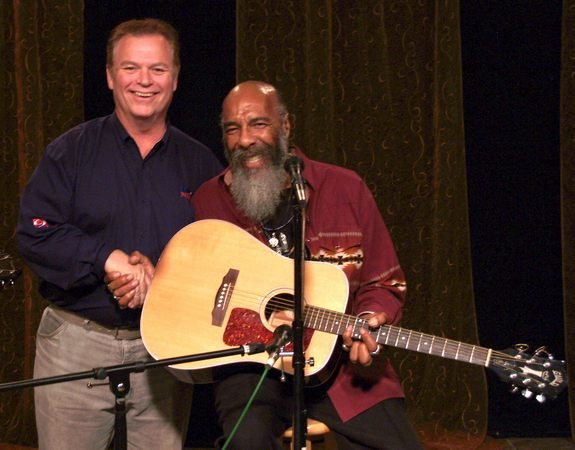
Havens with journalist Phil Konstantin, on January 25, 2010

On May 3, 2009, Havens performed at the fundraising concert in honor of Pete Seeger's 90th birthday. In June 2009, he performed at the fifth annual Mountain Jam Festival. The event, hosted by The Allman Brothers Band and Gov't Mule guitarist Warren Haynes, was held at the Hunter Mountain Ski Resort in Hunter, New York. As is the tradition, the festival took place on the weekend following Memorial Day.

On June 20, 2009, Havens performed at the Clearwater Festival. On July 4, 2009, he performed at the Woodstock Tribute festival in Ramsey, New Jersey. On August 8, 2010, he performed at Musikfest 2010, at Foy Hall at Moravian College in Bethlehem, Pennsylvania.

== Personal life ==
=== Health issues ===
In 2010, Havens underwent kidney surgery but did not recover sufficiently to perform as he had before. In March 2012, he announced on his Facebook page that he would retire from touring after 45 years, due to health concerns.

=== Death ===
On April 22, 2013, Havens died of a heart attack at the age of 72. The BBC referred to him as a "Woodstock icon", while Stephen Stills of Crosby, Stills, Nash & Young said Havens "could never be replicated". The Daily Telegraph stated that Havens "made an indelible mark on contemporary music", while Douglas Martin of The New York Times reported that Havens had "riveted Woodstock".

Pursuant to Havens's request, he was cremated, and his ashes were scattered from the air over the original site of the Woodstock Festival, in a ceremony held on August 18, 2013, the 44th anniversary of the festival's last day.

== Discography ==
=== Studio albums ===
| Year | Album | US Top 200 |
|---|---|---|
| 1966 | Mixed Bag | 182 |
| 1968 | Something Else Again | 184 |
| 1968 | Electric Havens | 192 |
| 1969 | The Richie Havens Record | – |
| 1969 | Richard P. Havens, 1983 | 80 |
| 1970 | Stonehenge | 155 |
| 1971 | Alarm Clock | 29 |
| 1971 | The Great Blind Degree | 126 |
| 1973 | Portfolio | 182 |
| 1974 | Mixed Bag II | 186 |
| 1976 | The End Of The Beginning | 157 |
| 1977 | Mirage | – |
| 1980 | Connections | – |
| 1984 | Common Ground | – |
| 1987 | Simple Things | 173 |
| 1987 | Sings Beatles and Dylan | – |
| 1991 | Now | – |
| 1994 | Cuts to the Chase | – |
| 2002 | Wishing Well | – |
| 2004 | Grace of the Sun | – |
| 2008 | Nobody Left to Crown | – |

=== Live albums ===
| Year | Album | US Top 200 |
|---|---|---|
| 1972 | Richie Havens on Stage | 55 |
| 1990 | Live at the Cellar Door | – |
| 2015 | Paris Live 1969 | – |

=== Compilations ===
| Year | Album | US Top 200 |
|---|---|---|
| 1987 | Collection | – |
| 1993 | Résumé: The Best of Richie Havens | – |
| 1995 | Classics | – |
| 1999 | Time | – |
| 2000 | The Millennium Collection | – |
| 2004 | Dreaming as One: The A&M Years | – |
| 2005 | High Flyin' Bird | – |
| 2012 | My Own Way | – |

=== Singles ===
| Year | Name | US BB | US CB |
|---|---|---|---|
| 1967 | "No Opportunity Necessary" | – | – |
| 1969 | "Rocky Raccoon" | – | 92 |
| 1969 | "Lady Madonna" | – | – |
| 1970 | "Handsome Johnny" | 115 | – |
| 1970 | "Alarm Clock" | – | – |
| 1971 | "Here Comes the Sun" | 16 | 15 |
| 1972 | "Freedom" | – | – |
| 1973 | "What About Me" | – | – |
| 1973 | "It Was a Very Good Year" | – | – |
| 1973 | "Eyesight to the Blind" | 111 | 101 |
| 1976 | "I'm Not in Love" | 102 | – |
| 1977 | "We All Wanna Boogie" | – | – |
| 1980 | "Going Back to My Roots" | – | – |

=== Appearances ===
- A Long Time Comin' by The Electric Flag – sitar and percussion (1968)
- Sesame Street (1970), He sings a remake of “Imagination Rain.” Music by Steve Zuckerman. Also appears singing several songs solo
- Please Don't Touch! by Steve Hackett (1978)
- Music and Songs from Starlight Express (1987) – performing "Light at the End of the Tunnel" and the "Starlight Sequence"
- Goya... a Life in Song – vocal and guitar performance on "Dog in the Quicksand".
- Songs of the Civil War (1991) – "Follow the Drinking Gourd" and "Give Us a Flag"
- OVO by Peter Gabriel (2000) (soundtrack of the Millennium Dome Show)
- "Freedom" on The Best of The Jammy's Volume One with the Mutaytor
- "The Long Road" (duet with Cliff Eberhardt) on 1990 album The Long Road
- "Gay Cavalier" (duet with Pino Daniele) on 1983 album Common Ground
- Some Assembly Required by Assembly of Dust's 2009
- Married... with Children (1992), "Rock of Ages" – guest appearance as himself
- "El Lugar (The Place)" by Francesco Bruno (1995), in which he appears as co-author and interpreter of the song
- Lifelines Live by Peter, Paul and Mary (1996)
- Warriors of Virtue (1997) – "Inside of You"
- Goodbye Country by Groove Armada (2001) – "Little by Little" and "Healing"
- Lovebox (Groove Armada) by Groove Armada (2002) – "Hands of Time"
- OVO by Peter Gabriel (1999) – "The Time of the Turning", "Make Tomorrow" (vocals)
- Woodstock by Portugal. The Man (2017) - "Number One" (archived vocals)
