= Jerry Merrick =

American singer-songwriter

Jerry Merrick was an American folk singer-songwriter. His songs have been recorded by Richie Havens, B.J. Thomas, Jerry Jeff Walker, and Susan Tedeschi.

Merrick is best known for writing "Follow," which appeared on the 1967 Richie Havens LP Mixed Bag (MCA Verve/Folkways), which Rolling Stone called a "Sixties folk epic." Havens also performed the song in concert appearances at the Newport Folk Festival and Carnegie Hall. It has since appeared on the soundtracks of several films.

Merrick also wrote "From the Prison," which Richie Havens recorded for his second studio LP, Something Else Again, released in January 1968. Havens opened his set at the Woodstock Music and Art Fair ("Woodstock") with "From the Prison". Havens was the opening act at Woodstock, so Merrick's song thus has the distinction of being the first song sung at Woodstock.

Merrick went on to record an album of original compositions for Mercury Records, released in 1969. Following this he moved his family away from New York City and teamed up briefly with fellow Mercury artist Kenny Rankin to appear on The Tonight Show and open for Flip Wilson in various venues throughout the US. He later decided to focus on his growing family, eventually leading him to withdraw from the music industry.

Meanwhile, his song "Guess I'll Pack My Things" was recorded by Tom Ghent on his self-titled debut for Bill Cosby's Tetragrammaton Records. This led B.J. Thomas to include the song on his 1970 Scepter album, Raindrops Keep Fallin' on My Head.

Jerry Jeff Walker later recorded Merrick's "The Stranger (He Was the Kind)" on his double album A Man Must Carry On. Walker also included "Follow" on his Electra release, Jerry Jeff.

In 1999, Merrick was located temporarily in Nashville, Tennessee. During this time he recorded Suddenly I'll Know You, produced by Tom Ghent on his Sutherland Records label.

Jerry Merrick died on January 2, 2019, from thyroid cancer.

== Discography ==
- Follow (1969, Mercury Records)
- Suddenly I'll Know You (2002, Sutherland Records)

== Filmography ==
- Coming Home (1978) with Jane Fonda and Jon Voight
- Flying Blind (1992 TV movie) with Corey Parker, Téa Leoni, Robert Bauer
- The War (1994) with Elijah Wood, Kevin Costner, Mare Winningham
- The Pallbearer (1996) with David Schwimmer, Gwyneth Paltrow, Michael Rapaport
- Hideous Kinky (1998) with Kate Winslet, Saïd Taghmaoui, Bella Riza
- The Practice (1998) Television series, final episode
- A Walk on the Moon (1999) with Diane Lane, Viggo Mortensen, Liev Schreiber
- Steal This Movie (2000) with Vincent D'Onofrio, Janeane Garofalo, Jeanne Tripplehorn, Kevin Pollak
- I'm Your Woman (2020) Amazon Studios
- For All Mankind (2021) season 2, episode 7
