= Stonehenge (Richie Havens album) =

Studio album by Richie Havens
- Released: 1970
- Recorded: RKO General Studios, New York City
- Labels: Verve Forecast 2317004; Stormy Forest 2317004
- Producers: Richie Havens, Mark Roth

Richie Havens chronology
Richard P. Havens, 1983 (1969)	Stonehenge (1970)	Alarm Clock (1971)

Stonehenge is a 1970 album by folk rock musician Richie Havens.

== Track listing ==
Except where otherwise noted, all tracks composed by Richie Havens

1. "Open Our Eyes" (Leon Lumpkins) – 2:56
2. "Minstrel from Gault" (Havens, Mark Roth) – 3:35
3. "It Could Be the First Day" – 2:22
4. "Ring Around the Moon" (Greg Brown, Havens) – 2:08
5. "It's All Over Now, Baby Blue" (Bob Dylan) – 5:01
6. "There's a Hole in the Future" – 2:07
7. "I Started a Joke" (Barry, Robin & Maurice Gibb) – 2:58
8. "Prayer" – 2:56
9. "Tiny Little Blues" – 2:08
10. "Shouldn't All the World Be Dancing?" – 8:04

== Personnel ==
- Richie Havens - guitar, autoharp, sitar, koto, vocals
- David Bromberg - dobro
- Warren Bernhardt - organ
- Daniel Ben Zebulon - drums, conga
- Monte Dunn - guitar
- Donny Gerrard - bass
- Ken Lauber - piano
- Bill LaVorgna - drums
- Eric Oxendine - bass
- Donald McDonald - drums
- Bill Shepherd - string arrangements
- Paul "Dino" Williams - guitar

Technical

- Val Valentin - director of engineering
- Al Manger and Bernie Fox - recording and remix engineers
- Sid Maurer - art direction
- Mark Roth - cover design, photography
