= Something Else Again =

Studio album by Richie Havens
- Released: January 1968
- Recorded: September 8 & 20, 1967
- Genre: Folk, jazz, singer-songwriter
- Length: 43:34
- Label: Verve
- Producer: John Court

Richie Havens chronology
Mixed Bag (1966)	Something Else Again (1968)	Richard P. Havens, 1983 (1969)

Professional ratings
Review scores
Source	Rating
AllMusic	4/5 stars
Rolling Stone	(Favorable)

Something Else Again is the second studio album by American folk singer and guitarist Richie Havens, released in January 1968. The track "Run, Shaker Life" was based on a Shaker dance song by elder Issachar Bates and reworked from Havens' old band, the Last Men, who reunited for this recording. "No Opportunity Necessary, No Experience Needed" was later recorded by Canadian jazz-rock band Lighthouse on its first album in 1969 and reworked by Yes on its second album, Time and a Word.

== Track listing ==
1. "No Opportunity Necessary, No Experience Needed" (Richie Havens) – 2:58
2. "Inside of Him" (Havens) – 4:26
3. "The Klan" ("Alan Grey, David Grey," pseudonyms for Alan Arkin and David I. Arkin) – 4:31
4. "Sugarplums" – 2:54
5. "Don't Listen to Me" (Havens) – 4:27
6. "From the Prison" (Jerry Merrick) – 3:37
7. "Maggie's Farm" (Bob Dylan) – 4:38
8. "Something Else Again" – 7:30
9. "New City" (Havens, John Court) – 2:47
10. "Run, Shaker Life" (Havens, Joe Price, Mark Roth) – 5:46

== Personnel ==
- Richie Havens – vocals, guitar, sitar, tamboura
- Warren Bernhardt – organ, piano, clavinet
- Denny Gerrard – bass on "Run, Shaker Life"
- Don Payne – bass
- Adrian Guillery – guitar
- Paul "Dino" Williams – guitar, chant on "Run, Shaker Life"
- Daniel Ben Zebulon – conga, drums, chant on "Run, Shaker Life"
- Eddie Gómez – double bass
- Donald MacDonald – drums
- Skip Prokop – drums on "Run, Shaker Life"
- Jeremy Steig – flute
- John Blair – violin on "Inside of Him"

Technical

- Val Valentin – director of engineering
- Jerry Schoenbaum – production supervision

== Charts ==
year	chart	peak
1968	Billboard Pop Albums	184
