= Latter-day Saints Militias and Military Units =

Throughout its history the Latter Day Saint movement operated multiple militias and military units. One of the first militias was the Danite. The first military unit was the Nauvoo Legion, the city militia for Nauvoo, Illinois.

== Danites ==
The Danites were a fraternal organization founded by members of the Latter Day Saint movement in 1838 in Missouri. They operated as a vigilante group during a period of intense conflict known as the 1838 Mormon War.

== Nauvoo Legion ==
The Nauvoo Legion was a state-authorized militia of Nauvoo, Illinois, from 1841 until 1845. It was one of the largest private military forces in the United States at the time and served to protect the city of Nauvoo and its inhabitants. In 1845 the Nauvoo Legion lost its official sanction as an arm of the Illinois militia, following a controversy in which the Nauvoo Expositor newspaper was destroyed by the Legion on Joseph Smith's orders. The unit was dissolved and as former soldiers went west, they joined the Mormon battalion.

== Whistling and Whittling Brigade ==
With the repeal of the Nauvoo Charter, the city was left without an official militia or police force. In response, in March 1845, Brigham Young organized the Bishops and Deacons to "take care of the poor and guard the city at night, to keep everything straight". Out of these efforts came an organization known as the Whistling and Whittling Brigade who used legal, nonviolent means to monitor apostates, strangers, "Gentiles", or enemies and encourage them to leave town. Members would surround and follow suspicious individuals without engaging in conversation; they whittled pieces of wood, casting shavings in the person's direction, all while whistling, gathering more members of the group. The organization lasted for less than two months and was phased out as Nauvoo regained law enforcement.

== Mormon Battalion ==
The Mormon Battalion was the only religious unit in United States military history to be recruited solely from one religious body and having a religious title as the unit designation. The volunteers served from July 1846 to July 1847 during the Mexican–American War. The battalion made a grueling march of nearly 1,950 miles from Council Bluffs, Iowa, to San Diego, California.

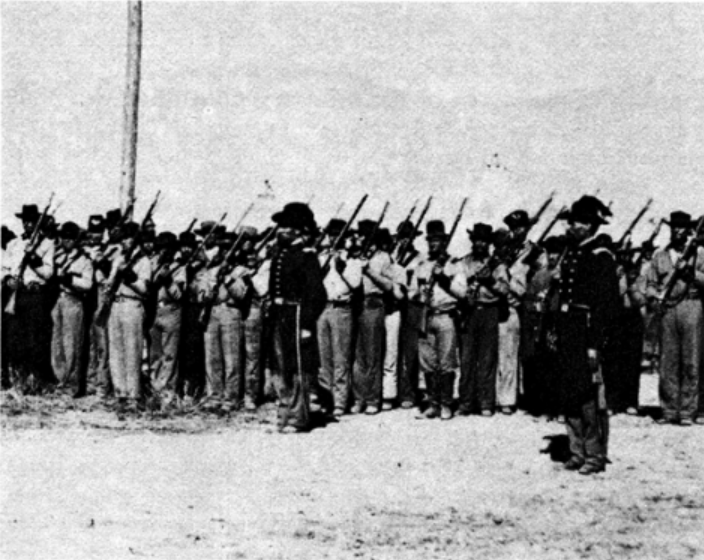
Third Regiment of the Nauvoo Legion in Utah.

== Utah Territorial Milita ==
The Utah Territorial Militia, also known as the Nauvoo Legion, was reestablished in 1849 in the Utah Territory. Its primary role was to provide security against Indian depredations to spreading Mormon settlements.

=== Utah Volunteer Cavalry Company ===
The Volunteer Cavalry Company was part of the Utah Territorial Militia during the Civil War. For three months, this company patrolled the main trail from Salt Lake City east to Independence Rock on the Sweetwater.

== Present day ==
Today, the Church of Jesus Christ of Latter Day Saints operates a security division known as the "Church Security Division" to protect church leaders and General Conference sessions.
