= Simple Things (Richie Havens album) =

Studio album by Richie Havens
- Released: 1987
- Genre: Folk
- Label: RBI

Richie Havens chronology
Common Ground (1984)	Simple Things (1987)	Richie Havens Sings the Beatles and Dylan (1987)

Simple Things is an album by the American folk musician Richie Havens, released in 1987. The album, along with Richie Havens Sings the Beatles and Dylan, from the same year, marked a recording comeback for Havens. Havens supported the album with a North American tour.

The album peaked at No. 173 on the Billboard 200. The title track and "Drivin'" were released as singles.

== Production ==
Rather than relying on just his acoustic guitar, Havens employed electronic drums, horns, choirs, and synthesizers. The album includes covers of songs written by Paul McCartney, John Martyn, and Vince Willis, among others.

== Critical reception ==
Professional ratings
Review scores
Source	Rating
AllMusic	3/5 stars
The Encyclopedia of Popular Music	1/5 stars
MusicHound Rock: The Essential Album Guide	2.5/5 stars
New Musical Express	1/10
The Philadelphia Inquirer	1/4 stars

The Washington Post wrote that "the songs, while hardly exceptional, are certainly tuneful, and Havens delivers them with typical feeling and conviction." The Sun Sentinel wrote: "Opening with an up-tempo ska number, Haven's rich, throaty vocal line reaches out of the tight studio mix to grab your attention."

The Ottawa Citizen thought that "it is ... disconcerting to hear the slick uptown grooves on the opening track, 'Drivin''." The Gazette noted the "very commercial '80s sound," but acknowledged that "Havens's voice is still an affecting instrument."

== Track listing ==
No.	Title	Length
1.	"Drivin'"	4:17
2.	"Simple Things"	4:07
3.	"Songwriter"	4:00
4.	"Passin' By"	4:22
5.	"Wake Up and Dream"	3:50
6.	"I Don't Wanna Know"	4:23
7.	"Shouldn't We All Be Having a Good Time"	5:23
8.	"Arrow Through Me"	4:23
9.	"Runner in the Night"	5:35
