= Fox Indian Massacre =

Start of the Fox Wars against French

Coordinates: 42.3626°N 82.9265°W

The Fox Indian Massacre marked the beginning of the Fox Wars which pitted the Meskwaki against New France and their indigenous allies. Several factors drove the massacre, including a potential Meskwaki alliance with the British, the opposition of neighboring indigenous peoples, such as the Illinois and Odawa, who sought to prevent Meskwaki empowerment, and French desire to avoid friction with their allies. The French reported that 500 Meskwaki were killed and 300 survivors were enslaved.

== Background ==
Between 1665 and 1670, the Meskwaki settled lands west of the Menominee in Northeastern Wisconsin, while the Sauk people claimed the area surrounding the present city of Green Bay. New France's allies in the general area were the Illinois, Ottawa, Ojibwe, Miami and Wyandot peoples. The fur trade and the hunting and trapping of elk, bison and beaver provided economic opportunities for Indians to ward off starvation. Wanting to invest in and control this new opportunity, a group of French elite smoked a calumet with the Meskwaki's chief in 1679, inaugurating what they both hoped would be a long, peaceful relationship. This new alliance complicated French aspirations for western civilization and power, however, because Meskwaki had been attacking villages of these peoples, creating tensions between them. Accordingly, The General Peace Conference of Montreal in 1701 took place in which the French expressed the wish for peace amongst the indigenous nations, particularly not excluding the Meskwaki.

== Fort Pontchartrain du Detroit ==
The French decided to establish a new settlement at Detroit during 1712 which increased tensions. Due to the fact that Cadillac wanted to use the fort so that he could operate as a middleman in the fur trade, New France and their indigenous allies were faced with the threat of having the Meskwaki become more equipped and armed. This meant that they would gain more strength within the region's fur trade compared to the New French Nations, while the French wanted to enlarge and stabilize their western influence.

== Massacre of 1712 ==
An Illinois chief named Makoundeby led a large army up from the Illinois Valley to Detroit to violently protest against the Meskwaki relationship with the French. Because of the Meskwaki moving into Fort Detroit in 1711, French-allied Indians asserted their own vision to exclude the Meskwaki from any power regarding the French by actively attacking Meskwaki villages around the surrounding fort. Calling the Meskwaki "dogs" while framing themselves as "masters," French-allied Indians, particularly the Illinois and Wyandot, besieged and slaughtered the Meskwaki; chasing its residents away from Detroit, killing thousands of souls, one hundred men and some nine hundred women and children were taken prisoner. This was known to be the most significant slave raid in North American colonial history.

== Peace Treaty of 1716 ==
The French and their indigenous allies defeated a large group of Meskwaki, grinding the violence to a halt. This resulted in the Meskwaki and their enemies gathering in the Saint Lawrence River valley to negotiate the peace treaty which was granted by the French signing the Fox Peace Treaty in 1716.
