= Mototícachi massacre =

1688 Spanish massacre

Mototícachi was a O'odham town in New Spain, located on the Sonora River, destroyed in a 1688 Spanish massacre.

== History ==
In 1688, Opatas accused the O'odham of assisting the Apache in the Apache–Mexico Wars. They claimed that seven O'odham from Mototícachi, including the town governor, had assisted in an attack on the Turicachi Valley, and were planning a second attack.

On July 25, 1688, a group of Spanish soldiers led by Corporal Nicolás de Higuera captured the accused men and brought them to Santa Rosa de Corodeguachi. There, the Spanish tortured one of the men "on the fleshy part of the arm" until he confessed, implicating his companions. All seven men were then executed.

The Spanish soldiers then rode to Mototícachi, where they ordered the resident O'odham to assemble in the town square, promising not to harm them. There, the Spaniards shackled them and burned the town. The 42 men of fighting age were taken to Bacoachi, where, at Higuera's request, Jesuit missionary Carlos Zelestri baptized all of them before their executions the next day. The 125 surviving women, children, and elderly O'odham townspeople were forcibly relocated to the Presidio de Felipe y Santiago de Sinaloa, 400 miles to the south.

In a letter of August 31, Juan Isidro de Pardiñas Villar de Francos, the governor of Nueva Vizcaya, condemned Higuera's actions as unauthorized and rash. Pardiñas subsequently ordered Higuera prosecuted for his actions, and on June 21, 1689, Higuera was condemned to death. The sentence was never carried out, however, and in 1695 Higuera was among the soldiers mobilized against a Pima uprising.
