= On Stage (Richie Havens album) =

Live album by Richie Havens
- Released: 1972
- Label: Stormy Forest 2SFS 6012
- Producer: Richie Havens

Richie Havens chronology
The Great Blind Degree (1971)	On Stage (1972)	Portfolio (1973)

On Stage (also known as Richie Havens on Stage) is a 1972 live album by Richie Havens. It registered on various charts.

== Background ==
The album was released in a 2LP format on Stormy Forest 2SFS 6012 in 1972. It came with a bonus single, "Freedom" bw "Handsome Johnny". The album was made up of recorded performances in England, California and New York.

== Reception ==
Along with Greatest Hits on Earth by The Fifth Dimension, Liza with a 'Z' by Liza Minnelli, and Mark, Don & Terry by Terry Knight and the Pack, Havens' album was one of the Record World four "Hits of the Week" albums for the week of 16 September 1972. The reviewer wrote that it was possibly Havens' finest album to date.

The album had a positive review in the 16 September issue of Cash Box. The reviewer wrote that for the fans of Richie Havens who believe he was better live, this album would please them to no end and the performances were truly something else.

It was given a positive review by Billboard in the magazine's 16 September issue. The reviewer wrote that the album had big sales potential and that Havens had never been in better form.

== Airplay ==
As per the College Radio Airplay Report in the 30 September issue of Record World, the album was on the playlist at WRCT-Carnegie-Mellon University in Pittsburgh, Pa. As shown in the 30 September issue of Record World, the album was on the playlist of FM stations; WMAL-FM in Washington DC, WKTK-FM in Baltimore, WRNO-FM in New Orleans and KIEL-FM in Eugene, Oregon.

As shown in the 7 October issue of Record World', the album was on the playlist at KRLD-FM in Dallas.

== Retail ==
According to the 30 September issue of Record World, the album was selling well at eight United States leading record retail outlets.

As reported in the 7 October issue of Record World, On Stage was one of the 5 Top Retail Sales albums for that week.

== Charts ==
=== United States ===
For the week of 30 September, the album debuted at No. 134 on the Record World 101-150 Album Chart. For the week of 7 October, the album was at No. 127. The following week, it debuted at No. 98 in the Record World Album Chart. At week ten, for the week of 17 December, the album peaked at No. 50. The album was still in the chart at No. 95 for the week of 30 December 1972. For the week of 6 January 1973, the album was at No. 146 in the 101-150 Album Chart.

=== Canada ===
Havens' On Stage album debuted at No. 96 on the RPM 100 Albums chart for the week of 18 November. The album peaked at No. 67 for the week of 25 November. It was still in the chart at No. 90 for the week of 30 December.

== Track listing from On Stage Stormy Forest – 2SFS 6012 ==
=== A ===
1. "From the Prison" - Merrick
2. "Younger Men Grow Older" - Roth, Havens
3. "Old Friends", Paul Simon
4. "God Bless The Child" - Hertzog Jr, Holliday

=== B ===
1. "The Dolphins" - Fred Neil
2. " Nobody Knows" - A. Berman-M. Bergman
3. "Just Like a Woman" - Bob Dylan
4. "No Opportunity Necessary, No Experience Needed" - Richie Havens

=== C ===
1. "Tupelo Honey" - Van Morrison
2. "Just Like a Woman" - Bob Dylan
3. "Teach Your Children" - Graham Nash
4. "Minstrel from Gault" - R. Havens-M. Roth

=== D ===
1. "High Flyin' Bird" - Billy Ed Wheeler
2. "San Francisco Bay Blues - Jesse Fuller
3. "Where Have All the Flowers Gone?" - Pete Seeger
4. "Rocky Raccoon" - J. Lennon-P. McCartney
