= This Day in North American Indian History =

2002 reference book by Phil Konstantin

This Day in North American Indian History is a reference work on the history of the Indigenous peoples of North America, organized by calendar date. The author is Phil Konstantin, a member of the Cherokee Nation. The book was published in 2002 by Da Capo Press.

== Contents ==
For each calendar date, the book lists historical events occurring on that date. For January 1, for example, the book has 14 entries ranging from 1756 to 1975. Those include the Ghost Dance vision experienced by Wovoka during the solar eclipse of January 1, 1889 and the seizure of the Alexian Brothers' Novitiate by Menominee Indians in 1975. The book has an appendix on tribal names and calendars as well as an extensive bibliography and index.

== Author ==
Konstantin has Cherokee ancestry through his maternal grandfather and is a member of the Cherokee Nation. He began working on the book in 1986.

== Reception ==
The book was positively received. Reviewers praised the neutral and concise style and the ease of browsing.
