= Handsome Johnny (song) =

Song by Richie Havens

from the album Mixed Bag
- A-side: "Handsome Johnny"
- B-side: "Sandy"
- Released: 1970
- Length: Album version 3:52
- Label: MGM K14141
- Songwriter: Gossett-Havens

US chronology
"There's A Hole in the Future" (1970)	"Handsome Johnny" (1970)	"Alarm Clock" (1970)

"Handsome Johnny" is an anti-war song that is known mostly for its performance by Richie Havens and the Woodstock Rock Festival in 1969. The single registered in the charts in 1970.

== Background ==
"Handsome Johnny" was written by Louis Gossett Jr and Richie Havens when Gossett was appearing at Broadway show, My Sweet Charlie in 1966. Havens recorded the composition sometime later that year. The song has been described as a "ringing protest of the War in Vietnam" and also said to have "clearly captured the nation’s mood at the time". Dave Gott calls the song "a classic anti-war ballad" which is "stoked by the singers unmistakable thumb-chorded guitar strumming".

Amongst the lyrics, Handsome Johnny, the man who the song is about is reduced to an assembly line object who is sent to die for his country. It's also an illustration of Richie Havens' frustration and the lack of understanding by the government.

"Handsome Johnny" backed with "Sandy" was released as a single on MGM 14141 in June 1970.

Some decades after Havens' release, Peter Tosh recorded a version of the song which was released on a posthumous album I Am That I Am in 2001. A version was recorded by The Flaming Lips which ended up on their 2002 compilation album, Finally the Punk Rockers Are Taking Acid.

At the memorial service for Richie Havens which was held at the Bethel Woods Center for the Arts on 15 August 2013, Louis Gossett told of the time when he was a struggling actor and was about to be evicted from his apartment. A letter arrived and inside was a check from Richie Havens for royalties earned from "Handsome Johnny".

== Reception ==
"Handsome Johnny" was in the Billboard Label's Disk Action Report list for the week of 13 June 1970. It was also one of the Top 60 Spotlight records that week. The reviewer wrote that it was one of Havens' finest performances and timely with a biting message with a strong beat that could easily become a left field smash hit. Also that week, the single was one of the Cash Box Choice Programming picks. The reviewer wrote that the song from his Mixed Bag album was old material to Havens fans, but it was timelier now and the material that it could turn up on AM and FM.

== Airplay ==
"Handsome Johnny" was added to the playlist of WAVZ in New Haven for the week of 6 June.

It was shown in the 20 June issue of Cash Box that "Handsome Johnny" had been added to the playlist of WIFE in Indiana the previous week.

As reported by Warren Carter in the 24 October 1970 issue of Billboard, "Handsome Johnny" was added to the playlist of WBCR at Bluffton College in Bluffton, Ohio.

== Charts ==
"Handsome Johnny" debuted at No. in the Billboard Bubbling Under the Hot 100 chart for the week of 20 June 1970. It peaked at No. 115 for the week of 11 July.

== Performances ==
According to the article, "Mariposa: A battle between electric and acoustic guitar" by Brian Cruchley, while Havens was performing the song, he was strumming so hard that he broke the bottom string on his guitar. He was to shout into the microphone, "some of you are not even listening... why don't you do something about it... I can almost hear the H-bombs whistling."

"Handsome Johnny" was performed by Havens on Johnny Carson's Tonight Show in 1967. When Havens finished the song, the audience was said to have risen to their feet to give him a standing ovation that lasted through least one commercial break.

== Album inclusion ==
"Handsome Johnny" appears on the various artists compilation,Core of Rock, Vol. 2 that was released on MGM SE 4710 in November 1970.

Another version of "Handsome Johnny" appears on Richie Havens' On Stage album that was released on Stormy Forest 2 SFS 6012 in 1972.
