= Bear River Massacre =

1863 massacre of Shoshone by U.S. military

Coordinates: 42°08′46″N 111°54′51″W

Bear River Massacre Shoshoni: Boa Ogoi Massacre
- Part of the American Indian Wars (Note: Official military records and the National Park Service's listing of Civil War Battlefields also include the Bear River massacre as part of the American Civil War.)
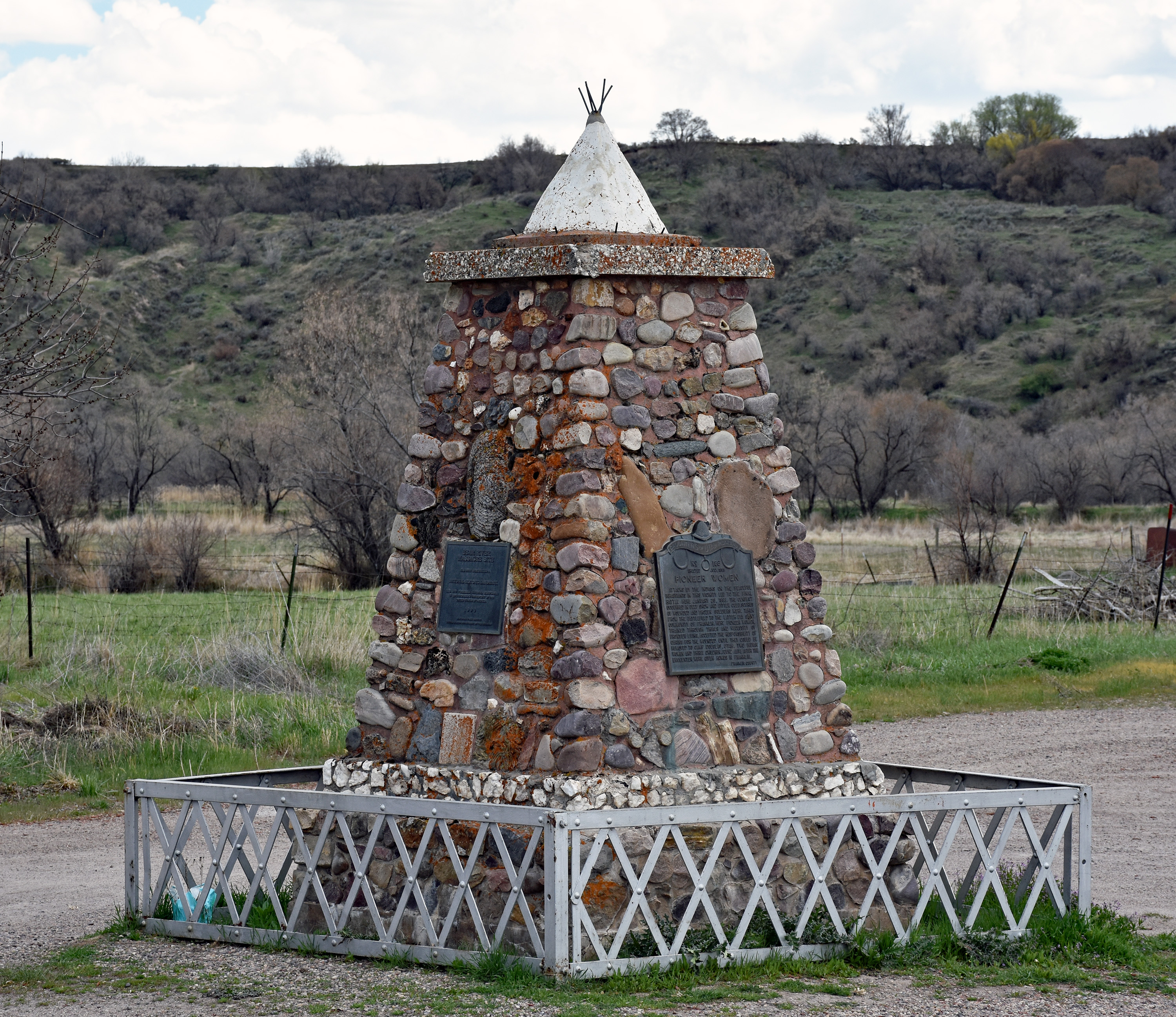
- Monument at the site
Date	January 29, 1863
Location	Bear River, Cache Valley, Washington Territory (Present-day: Franklin County, Idaho)
Result	United States victory

Participants
United States	Northern Shoshone (Cache Valley band)

Commanders and leaders
(United States) Patrick Edward Connor	Bear Hunter †

Strength
~200 men	~120 men

Casualties and losses
21 killed 46 wounded	~250–493 killed, (Note: Estimates of the total number of victims (men, women and children) killed vary, with some stated figures including 250, 350, 400, and 493.); ~160 captured

The Bear River Massacre was a United States military attack that killed an estimated 250 to 493 children, women, and men at a Shoshone winter encampment on January 29, 1863. Some sources describe it as the largest mass murder of Native Americans by the US military and the largest single episode of genocide in US history. It took place in present-day Franklin County, Idaho near the present-day city of Preston on January 29, 1863. After years of skirmishes and food raids on farms and ranches, and settlers displacing Shoshone from their ancestral lands, the United States Army attacked a large Shoshone community at the confluence of the Bear River and Battle Creek in what was then southeastern Washington Territory.

Colonel Patrick Edward Connor led a detachment of California Volunteers as part of the Bear River Expedition against Shoshone chief Bear Hunter. Around 250 to 400 Northern Shoshone children and adults were killed near their homes, and 21 US soldiers died. The event is also known as the Engagement on the Bear River, the Battle of Bear River, and the Massacre at Boa Ogoi.

== Early history and causes ==
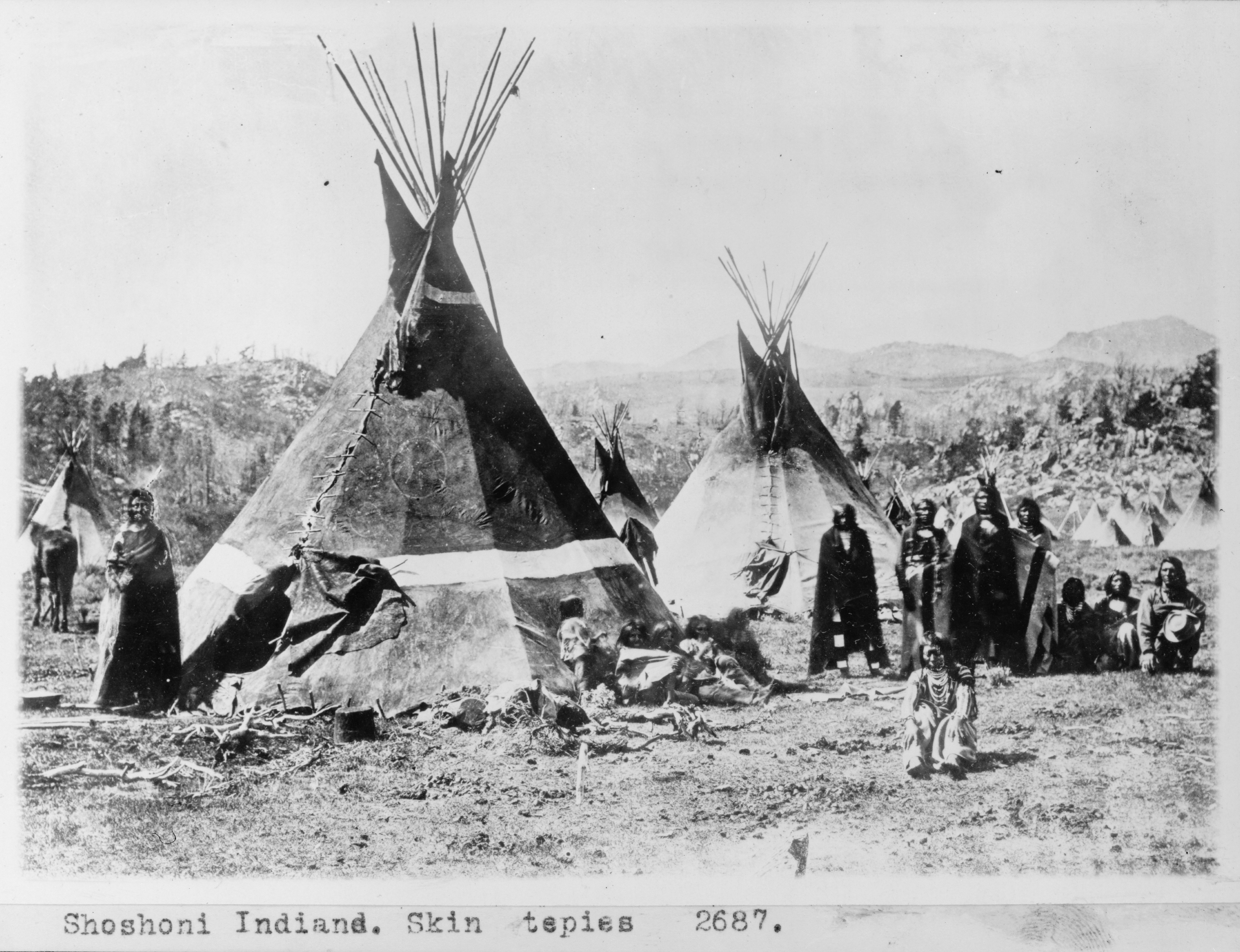
A Shoshone encampment in the Wind River Range of Wyoming, photographed by W.H. Jackson, 1870

Cache Valley, originally called Seuhubeogoi (Shoshone for "Willow Valley"), was the traditional hunting ground for the Northwestern Shoshone. They gathered grain and grass seeds there, fished for trout, and hunted small game such as ground squirrel and woodchuck, and large game including bison, deer, and elk. This mountain valley had attracted fur trappers such as Jim Bridger and Jedediah Smith, who visited the region. It was named Cache Valley for the trappers' practice of leaving stores of furs and goods (i.e., a cache) in the valley as a base for hunting in the surrounding mountain ranges.

So impressed were the trappers by the region that they recommended to Brigham Young that he consider the valley as a location for his settlement of Mormon pioneers. Instead, Young chose Salt Lake Valley, but Mormon settlers eventually moved to Cache Valley as well. As early as July 31, 1847, a 20-man delegation of Shoshone met with the Mormons to discuss their land claims in northern Utah. All of this was over the backdrop of the continent-spanning American Indian Wars and the White settlers' American imperialist views on Manifest destiny, and their resulting genocide of US Native Americans.

=== Immigrant pressures causing Shoshone starvation ===
The establishment of the California and Oregon Trails, as well as the founding of Salt Lake City in 1847, brought the Shoshone people into regular contact with white colonists moving westward. By 1856, European Americans had established their first permanent settlements and farms in Cache Valley, starting at Wellsville, Utah, and gradually moving northward.

Brigham Young declared the policy that Mormon settlers should establish friendly relations with the surrounding American Indian tribes. He encouraged their helping to "feed them rather than fight them". Despite the policy, the settlers were consuming significant food resources and taking over areas that pushed the Shoshone increasingly into areas of marginal food production. David H. Burr, Surveyor General of the Territory of Utah, wrote in 1856 that the local Shoshone Indians reported that the Mormons used so much of the Cache Valley's resources that the once abundant game no longer appeared. Foraging and hunting by settlers traveling on the western migration trails took additional food sources away from the Shoshone. As early as 1859, Jacob Forney, the Superintendent of Indian Affairs for the Territory of Utah, recognized the impact of migrants, writing, "The Indians...have become impoverished by the introduction of a white population". He recommended that an Indian Reservation be established in Cache Valley to protect essential resources for the Shoshone. His superiors at the United States Department of the Interior did not act on his proposal. Desperate and starving, the Shoshone attacked farms and cattle ranches, not just for revenge but for survival.

In the early spring of 1862, James Duane Doty, Utah's Territorial Superintendent of Indian Affairs, spent four days in Cache Valley and reported: "The Indians have been in great numbers, in a starving and destitute condition. No provisions having been made for them, either as to clothing or provisions by my predecessors... The Indians condition was such-with the prospect that they would rob mail stations to sustain life." Doty purchased supplies of food and slowly doled it out. He suggested furnishing the Shoshone with livestock to enable them to become herders instead of beggars.

On July 28, 1862, John White discovered gold on the Grasshopper Creek in the southwestern Montana mountains. Soon, miners created a migration and supply trail right through the middle of Cache Valley, between this mining camp and Salt Lake City. The latter was the nearest significant trading source of goods and food in the area.

== Outbreak of the Civil War ==
When the American Civil War began in 1861, President Abraham Lincoln was concerned that California, which had just recently become a state, would be cut off from the rest of the Union. He ordered several regiments to be raised from the population of California to help protect mail routes and the communications lines of the West. Neither Lincoln nor the U.S. War Department quite trusted the Mormons of the Utah Territory to remain loyal to the Union, despite their leader Young's telegrams and assurances. The Utah War and Mountain Meadows massacre were still fresh in the minds of military planners. They worried that the Mormons' substantial militia might answer only to Young and not the federal government.

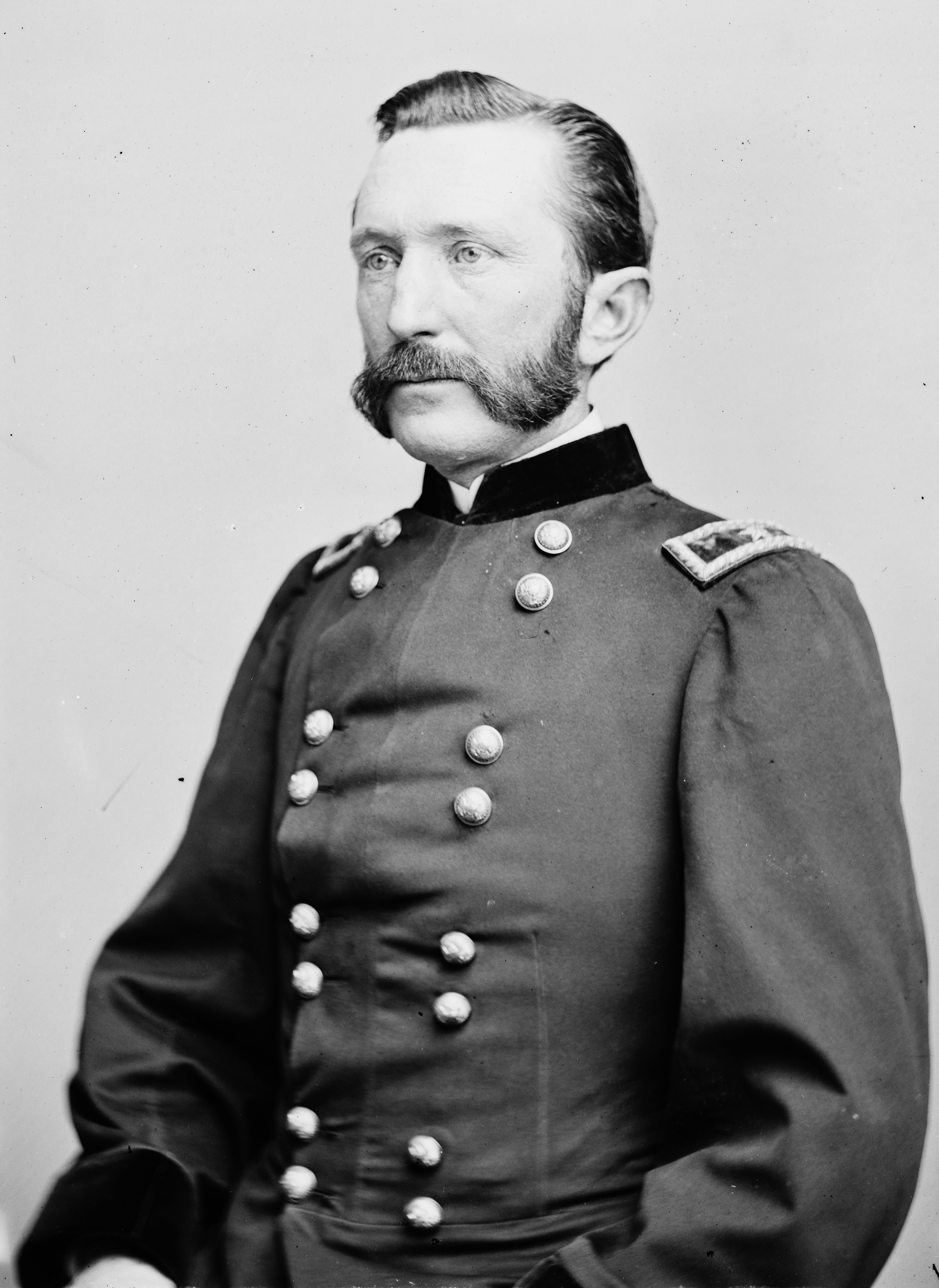
General Patrick Edward Connor after his promotion

Col. Patrick Edward Connor was put in command of the 3rd California Volunteer Infantry Regiment and ordered to move his men to Utah, to protect the Overland Mail Route and keep peace in the region. Upon arriving in Utah, he established Camp Douglas (adjacent to the current location of the University of Utah) as the primary base of operations for his unit. It was within a few miles of the Mormon Temple construction site and downtown Great Salt Lake City.

== Warnings and conflicts with Cache Valley settlers ==
Several incidents in the summer and fall of 1862 led to the battle between Bear Hunter and Col. Connor. These incidents were related to broad struggles between indigenous peoples and European-American settlers over almost the entire United States west of the Mississippi River. The attention of most of the nation's population was focused on the Civil War in the eastern states. Some historians have overlooked these incidents because they occurred near the ill-defined boundary of two different territories: those of Washington and Utah. While the incidents took place in proximity, the administrative centers dealing with them were more than 1,000 miles (1,600 km) apart, so it was difficult to integrate reports. For example, for years, residents and officials believed Franklin and the area of conflict was part of the Utah Territory. Residents of Franklin sent elected representatives to the Utah Territorial Legislature; they were part of the politics of Cache County, Utah, until 1872 when a surveying team determined the community was in Idaho territory.

=== Pugweenee ===
Pugweenee was a Shoshone Native American living in Summit Creek (now Smithfield). He was accused of stealing a horse from a resident of Richmond. He was arrested by Thomas Winn, George Barber, and Sylvanus Collett and held at John G. Smith's home - one of the few structures built at the time (July 23, 1860). Within several hours some young Shoshone Native Americans came to free him. The exchange became heated and Pugweenee made a dash for freedom. Gunshots were fired from both sides killing Pugweenee and injuring the guard Samuel Cousins. Settlers started assembling after hearing the gunshots. The Natives fled for cover in the brush along the Summit Creek and made their way toward today's Main Street. They came upon a group from Franklin, Idaho traveling down to the Pioneer Day celebration in Weber County. The group consisted of James Reed and the families of Arthur Cowan and Thomas Slater. The Natives fired on them killing Reed and injuring Cowan. The Natives continued up the South side of the creek, crossed near the mouth of today's James Mack Park (where the Shoshone's camp was at the time) and pressed up the hill onto today's Upper Canyon Road. Two brothers, Ira and Solyman Merrill, were driving their wagon down the canyon after gathering willows to make a bowery for the Pioneer Day celebration that would take place the following day. The Natives fired on the two, killing Ira and injuring Solyman. The pursuing settlers followed the Natives as far as Indian Canyon before loosing them. When the settlers returned they dispatched to Logan with the news of the skirmish and 25 mounted minute men hurried to the area for reinforcements.

Following the incident the settlers decided to bring their wagons close together fort style to protect against future attacks from Natives. Men and boys took turns standing guard at night and while settlers work their fields. The incident was reported a few days later in a Salt Lake newspaper, The Mountaineer on July 28, 1860. An eye witness account by Margaret Sant was published in the Smithfield Sentinel on the 66th anniversary of the incident July 23, 1926.

=== Massacre near Fort Hall ===
During the summer of 1859, a settler company of about 19 people from Michigan was traveling on the Oregon Trail near Fort Hall when they were attacked at night by people they assumed were local Shoshone. Several members of the company were killed by gunfire. The survivors took refuge along the Portneuf River, where they hid among the bullrushes and willow trees. Three days later, Lieutenant Livingston of Fort Walla Walla, leading a company of dragoons, met the survivors. He investigated the incident and documented what he called the brutality of the attack. According to the Deseret News of September 21, 1859, a detachment of Lieutenant Livingston's dragoons found five bodies at the scene of the massacre were mangled. A girl of only five years old had her ears cut off, her eyes gouged out, both legs amputated at the knees, and by all appearances, was made to walk on her stumps.

=== Reuben Van Ornum and the Battle of Providence ===
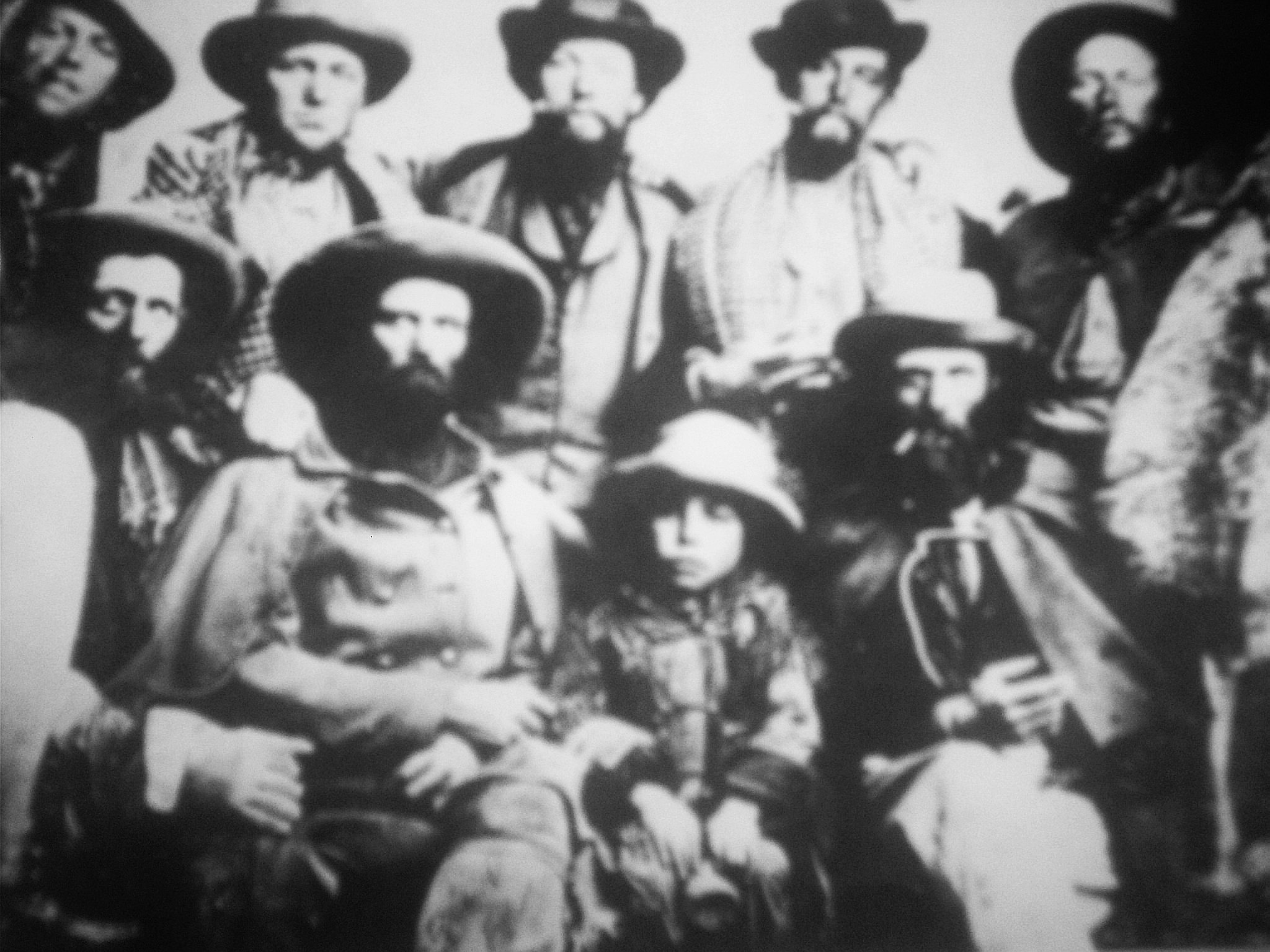
A picture of young Reuben Van Ornum seated in the middle: his uncle Zachias, is to his left

On September 9, 1860, Elijah Utter was leading migrants on the Oregon trail when they were attacked by a group of presumably Bannock and Boise Shoshone. Despite settlers' attempts to appease the Native Americans, the Indians killed nearly the entire migrant party and drove off their livestock. Alexis Van Ornum, his family, and about ten others hid in some nearby brush, only to be discovered and killed. Their bodies were discovered by a company of U.S. soldiers led by Captain Frederick T. Dent. Lieutenant Marcus A. Reno came across the mutilated bodies of six of the Van Ornums. The survivors reported that the attacking warriors took four Van Ornum children captive. As a direct result of this attack, the Army established a military fort near the present location of Boise, Idaho, along the migrant trail. Colonel George Wright requested $150,000 to establish a military post to sustain five troop companies.

Zachias Van Ornum, Alexis' brother, heard from a relative on the Oregon Trail that a small white boy of his missing nephew Reuben's age was being held by a group of Northwestern Shoshone, likely to be in Cache Valley. Van Ornum gathered a small group of friends and traveled to Salt Lake City to get help from the territorial government. There, he visited Col. Connor at Fort Douglas and asked for help to regain his nephew. Col. Connor agreed and sent a detachment of cavalry under the command of Major Edward McGarry to Cache Valley to rendezvous with Van Ornum near the town of Providence, Utah. Van Ornum located a small group of Shoshone warriors being led by Chief Bear Hunter. He and McGarry's men followed the Shoshone as they retreated to nearby Providence Canyon. After the Indians opened fire, McGarry gave the order "to commence firing and to kill every Indian they could see." A skirmish between the Shoshone and the U.S. Army lasted about two hours after the Shoshone established a defensible position in the canyon. Finally, Chief Bear Hunter signaled surrender by climbing a foothill and waving a flag of truce.

Together with about 20 of his people, Chief Bear Hunter was taken prisoner and transported to the soldiers' camp near Providence. When asked about the young white boy, Bear Hunter said that the boy had been sent away a few days earlier. McGarry instructed Bear Hunter to send his people to bring back the white boy. He held Bear Hunter and four warriors hostage. By noon the next day, the Shoshone returned with a small boy who fit the description of Reuben Van Ornum. Zachias Van Ornum said the boy was his nephew and took custody, departing to return to Oregon. The Shoshone protested, stating the boy was the son of a French fur trapper and the sister of Shoshone chief Washakie. After the federal troops left with Van Ornum and the young boy, McGarry reported to Col. Connor the boy's rescue "without the loss or scratch of man or horse." Bear Hunter complained to the settlers in Cache Valley, arguing they should have helped him against the soldiers. After a confrontation between Bear Hunter, some warriors from his band, and nearly 70 members of the Cache Valley militia, the settlers donated two cows and some flour as the "best and cheapest policy" as compensation.

=== Bear River crossing ===
On December 4, 1862, Connor sent McGarry on another expedition to Cache Valley to recover some stolen livestock from Shoshone. The Shoshone broke camp, fled in advance of the Army troops, and cut the ropes of a ferry at the crossing. McGarry got his men across the river but had to leave their horses behind. Four Shoshone warriors were captured and held for ransom, although they did not appear related to the theft. McGarry ordered that these men would be shot if the stock was not delivered by noon the next day. The Shoshone chiefs moved their people further north into Cache Valley. A firing squad executed the captives and dumped their bodies into the Bear River. In an editorial, the Deseret News expressed concern that the execution would aggravate relations with the Shoshone.

=== Incident on the Montana Trail ===
A.H. Conover, the operator of a Montana Trail freight-hauling service between mining camps of Montana and Salt Lake City, was attacked by Shoshone warriors who killed two men accompanying him: George Clayton and Henry Bean. Arriving in Salt Lake City, Conover told a reporter the Shoshone were "determined to avenge the blood of their comrades" killed by Major McGarry and his soldiers. He said the Shoshone intended to "kill every white man they should meet on the north side of the Bear River, till they should be fully avenged."

=== Attack on the Montana Trail ===
The final catalyst for Connor's expedition was a Shoshone attack on a group of eight miners on the Montana Trail. They had come within 2 miles (3 km) of the central Shoshone winter encampment north of Franklin. The miners missed a turn and ended up mired and lost on the western side of the Bear River, unable to cross the deep river. Three men swam across to Richmond, where they tried to get provisions and a guide from the settlers. Before they returned, the other five men were attacked by Shoshone, who killed John Henry Smith of Walla Walla and some horses. When the Richmond people returned with the advance party, they recovered the body of John Smith and buried him at the Richmond city cemetery.

The surviving miners reached Salt Lake City. William Bevins testified before Chief Justice John F. Kinney and swore an affidavit describing Smith's murder. He also reported that ten miners en route to the city had been murdered three days before Smith. Kinney issued a warrant for the arrest of chiefs Bear Hunter, Sanpitch, and Sagwitch. He ordered the territorial marshal to seek assistance from Col. Connor for a military force to "effect the arrest of the guilty Indians."

Due to such reports, Connor was ready to mount an expedition against the Shoshone. He reported to the U.S. War Department before the engagement:

I have the honor to report that from information received from various sources of the encampment of a large body of Indians on Bear River, in Utah Territory, 140 miles north of this point, who had settlements in this valley to the Beaver Head mines, east of the Rocky Mountains, and being satisfied that they were a part of the same band who had been murdering emigrants on the Overland Mail Route for the last fifteen years, and the principal actors and leaders in the horrid massacres of the past summer, I determined, although the season was unfavorable to an expedition in consequence of the cold weather and deep snow, to chastise them if possible.

== Military action in Cache Valley ==
In many ways, the soldiers stationed at Fort Douglas were spoiling for a fight. In addition to discipline problems among the soldiers, there was a minor "mutiny" among the soldiers where a joint petition by most of the California Volunteers requested to withhold over $30,000 from their paychecks for the sole purpose of instead paying for naval passage to the eastern states, and to "serve their country in shooting traitors instead of eating rations and freezing to death around sage brush fires...". Furthermore, they said they would gladly pay this money "for the privilege (original emphasis) of going to the Potomac and getting shot." The War Department declined this request.

Throughout most of January 1863, soldiers at Fort Douglas were preparing for a lengthy expedition traveling north to the Shoshone. Connor also wanted to keep the word of his expedition secret, making a surprise attack upon the Shoshone when he arrived. To do this, he separated his command into two detachments that were to come together from time to time on their journey to Cache Valley. His main concern was to avoid the problems that McGarry had faced in the earlier action, where the Shoshone had moved and scattered even before his troops could arrive.

Reaction to this military campaign was mixed. George A. Smith, in the official Journal History of the LDS Church, wrote:

It is said that Col. Connor is determined to exterminate the Indians who have been killing the Emigrants on the route to the Gold Mines in Washington Territory. Small detachments have been leaving for the North for several days. If the present expedition copies the doings of the other that preceded it, it will result in catching some friendly Indians, murdering them, and letting the guilty scamps remain undisturbed in their mountain haunts.

On the other hand, the Deseret News in an editorial, expressed:

...with ordinary good luck, the volunteers will "wipe them out." ....We wish this community rid of all such parties, and if Col. Connor be successful in reaching that bastard class of humans who play with the lives of the peaceable and law-abiding citizens in this way, we shall be pleased to acknowledge our obligations.

The first group to leave Fort Douglas was forty men of Company K, 3rd Regiment California Volunteer Infantry, commanded by Captain Samuel W. Hoyt, accompanied by 15 baggage wagons and two "mountain howitzers", totaling 80 soldiers. They left on January 22, 1863. The second group was 220 cavalry, led personally by Connor himself with his aides and 50 men each from Companies A, H, K, and M of the 2nd Regiment of Cavalry, California Volunteers, which left on January 25. As orders specific for this campaign, Connor ordered each soldier to carry "40 rounds of rifle ammunition and 30 rounds of pistol ammunition". This was a total of nearly 16,000 rounds for the campaign. In addition, nearly 200 rounds of artillery shot were brought with the howitzers. As a part of the deception, the cavalry were to travel at night while the infantry moved during the day. Accompanying Connor was the former U.S. Marshal and Mormon scout, Orrin Porter Rockwell.

On the evening of January 28, Captain Hoyt's infantry finally arrived near the town of Franklin, where they spotted three Shoshone who were attempting to get food supplies from the settlers in the town. The Shoshone received nine bushels of wheat in three sacks. William Hull, the settler who was assisting the Shoshone, noted later:

we had two of the three horses loaded, having put three bushels on each horse...when I looked up and saw the Soldiers approaching from the south. I said to the Indian boys, "Here comes the Toquashes (Shoshone for U.S. Soldiers) maybe, you will all be killed. They answered 'maybe the Toquashes will be killed too," but not waiting for the third horse to be loaded, they quickly jumped upon their horses and led the three horses away, disappearing in the distance.

The sacks of grain carried by these Shoshone were later found by the 3rd California Volunteers during their advance the next day, apparently dropped by the Shoshone in their attempt to get back to their camp.

Col. Connor met up with Hoyt that evening as well, with orders to begin moving at about 1:00 am the next morning for a surprise attack, but an attempt to get a local settler to act as a scout for the immediate area led the actual advance to wait until 3:00 am.

This military action occurred during perhaps the coldest time of the year in Cache Valley. Local settlers commented that it was unseasonably cold even for northern Utah, and it may have been as cold as −20 °F (−30 °C) on the morning of the 29th when the attack began. Several soldiers had come down with frostbite and other cold-weather problems, so the 3rd volunteers were at only about 2/3 of their strength compared to when they had left Fort Douglas. Among the rations issued to the soldiers during the campaign was a ration of whiskey held in a canteen; several soldiers noted that this whiskey froze solid on the night before the attack.

== Shoshone battle preparations ==
Most of the firearms that the Shoshone had at the time of the attack had been captured in minor skirmishes, traded from fur trappers, white settlers, and other Native American tribal groups, or simply antiques that had been handed down from one generation to another over the years. Their weapons were not as standardized or as well built as the guns issued by the Union Army to the soldiers of the California Volunteers.

Bear Hunter and the other Shoshone chiefs did, however, make some defensive arrangements around their encampment, in addition to simply selecting a generally defensible position in the first place. Willow branches had been woven into makeshift screens, hiding the position and numbers of Shoshone. They also dug a series of "rifle pits" along the eastern bank of Beaver Creek and the Bear River.

At the same time the arrest warrant was issued by Justice Kinney, Chief Sagwitch (named in the warrant) was in Salt Lake City trying to negotiate peace on behalf of the Northwestern Shoshone. A correspondent for the Sacramento Union reported, "The Prophet (Brigham Young) had told Sagwitch the Mormon people had suffered enough from the Shoshoni of Cache Valley and that if more blood were spilled, the Mormons might just "pitch in" and help the troops."

While it appears as though the deception by Connor to hide the numbers of his soldiers involved in the confrontation was successful, the Shoshone were not even then anticipating a direct military engagement with these soldiers. Instead, they were preparing for a negotiated settlement where the chiefs would be able to talk with officers of the U.S. Army and try to come to an understanding.

== Massacre ==
Major McGarry and the first cavalry units of the 2nd Regiment California Volunteer Cavalry arrived at the massacre scene at 6:00 am, just as dawn broke over the mountains. Due to the weather conditions and deep snow, it took time for Connor to organize his soldiers into a battle line. The artillery never arrived as they got caught in a snow drift six miles (9.7 km) from the Shoshone encampment. Connor or his subordinate Major Edward McGarry was reported to have commanded "Kill everything—nits make lice."

Chief Sagwitch noted the approach of the American soldiers, saying just before the first shots were fired,

Look like there is something up on the ridge up there. Look like a cloud. Maybe it is a steam come from a horse. Maybe that's them soldiers they were talking about.

Initially, Connor tried a direct frontal offensive against the Shoshone positions but was soon overwhelmed with return gunfire from the Shoshone. The California Volunteers suffered most of their direct combat-related casualties during this first assault.

After temporarily retreating and regrouping, Connor sent McGarry and several other smaller groups into flanking maneuvers to attack the village from the sides and behind. He directed a line of infantry to block any attempt by the Shoshone to flee from the attack. After about two hours, the Shoshone had run out of ammunition. According to some later reports, some Shoshone were seen trying to cast lead ammunition during the middle of the battle and died with the molds in their hands. Bear Hunter was killed, with some later reporting that he had been among those casting bullets; Madsen described the possibility as "doubtful".

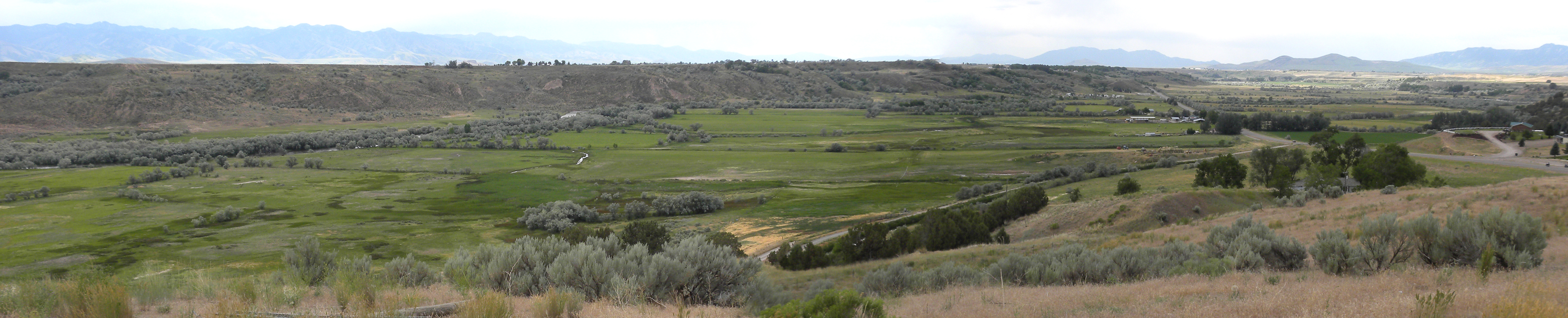
The location where the massacre took place, viewed from the north

== Casualties and immediate aftermath ==
The California Volunteers suffered 14 soldiers killed and 49 wounded, 7 mortally. After the officers concluded the battle was over, they returned with the soldiers to their temporary encampment near Franklin. Franklin residents opened their homes to wounded soldiers that night. They brought blankets and hay to the church meetinghouse to protect the other soldiers from the cold. Connor hired several men to use sleighs to bring wounded men back to Salt Lake City.

Connor estimated his forces killed more than 224 out of 300 warriors. He reported capturing 175 horses and some arms, and destroying 70 lodges and a large quantity of stored wheat in winter supplies. He left a small quantity of wheat on the field for the 160 captured women and children.

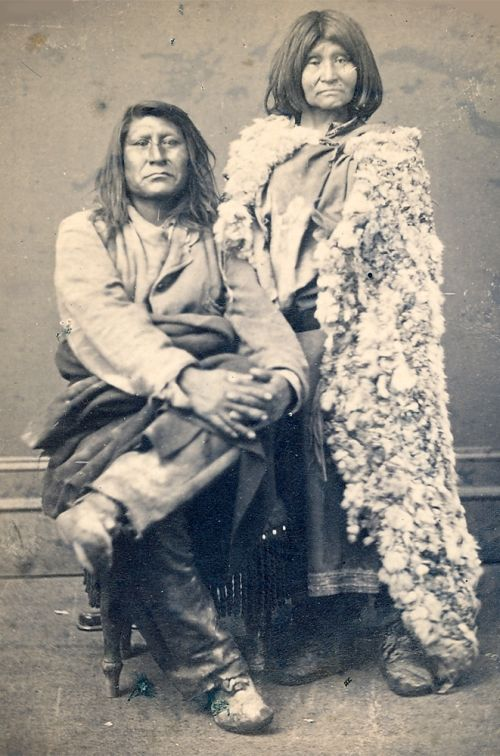
Massacre survivor Chief Sagwitch and spouse Beawoachee, circa 1875

The death toll was large, but some Shoshone survived. Many sources state that US soldiers raped Shoshone women during the attack. Chief Sagwitch gathered survivors to keep his community alive. Sagwitch was shot twice in the hand and tried to escape on horseback, only to have the horse shot out from under him. He went to the ravine and escaped into the Bear River near a hot spring, where he floated under some brush until nightfall. Sagwitch's son, Beshup Timbimboo, was shot seven times but survived and was rescued by family members. Other band members hid in the willow brush of the Bear River or tried to act as if they were dead. Sagwitch and other survivors retrieved the wounded and built a fire to warm the survivors.

There was a large difference between the number of Indians reported killed by Connor and the number counted by the citizens of Franklin, the latter being much larger. The settlers also said the number of surviving women and children to be much fewer than what Connor had stated. In his 1911 autobiography, Danish immigrant Hans Jasperson said he walked among the bodies and counted 493 dead Shoshone people. In 1918, Sagwitch's son Be-shup, Frank Timbimboo Warner, said, "[H]alf of those present got away," and 156 were killed. He went on to say that two of his brothers and a sister-in-law "lived", as well as many who later lived at the Washakie, Utah, settlement, the Fort Hall reservation, in the Wind River country, and elsewhere. Historian Brigham D. Madsen estimated about 250 were killed in the massacre.

== Effects on settlement of Cache Valley and long-term consequences ==
This conflict marked the final significant influence of the Shoshone nation upon Cache Valley and its immediate surroundings. In addition to opening the northern part of Cache Valley to Mormon settlement, the massacre opened Cache Valley as a staging area for additional settlements in southeastern Idaho. Friction between the Mormons and Col. Connor continued for many more years with accusations of harassment of non-Mormons in the Utah Territory and criticisms by Mormons of Connor's attempts to begin a mining industry in Utah. The overall response from local Mormon settlers was gratitude for eliminating the local Shoshone people, while a number expressed remorse for their suffering. Historian Madsen states that "Tacitly, if not overtly, the Mormons were accomplices" to the massacre.

Chief Sagwitch and many members of his band allied with the Mormons. Many were baptized and joined the LDS Church. Sagwitch was ordained as an Elder in the Melchizedek priesthood. Members of this band helped to establish the town of Washakie, Utah, named in honor of the Shoshone chief. Most of the remaining members of the Northwestern band of Shoshone built farms and homesteads under LDS Church sponsorship. Their descendants became largely integrated into mainstream LDS society. The Shoshone who were not involved with this settlement went to the Fort Hall Indian Reservation or the Wind River Indian Reservation.

According to published newspaper articles, Col. Connor and the California Volunteers were treated as heroes when they arrived at Fort Douglas and by their community in California. Connor was promoted to the permanent rank of brigadier general and given a brevet promotion shortly afterward to the rank of major general. Connor campaigned against Native Americans in the West for the remainder of the U.S. Civil War, leading the Powder River Expedition against the Sioux and Cheyenne.

== Memorials and legacy ==
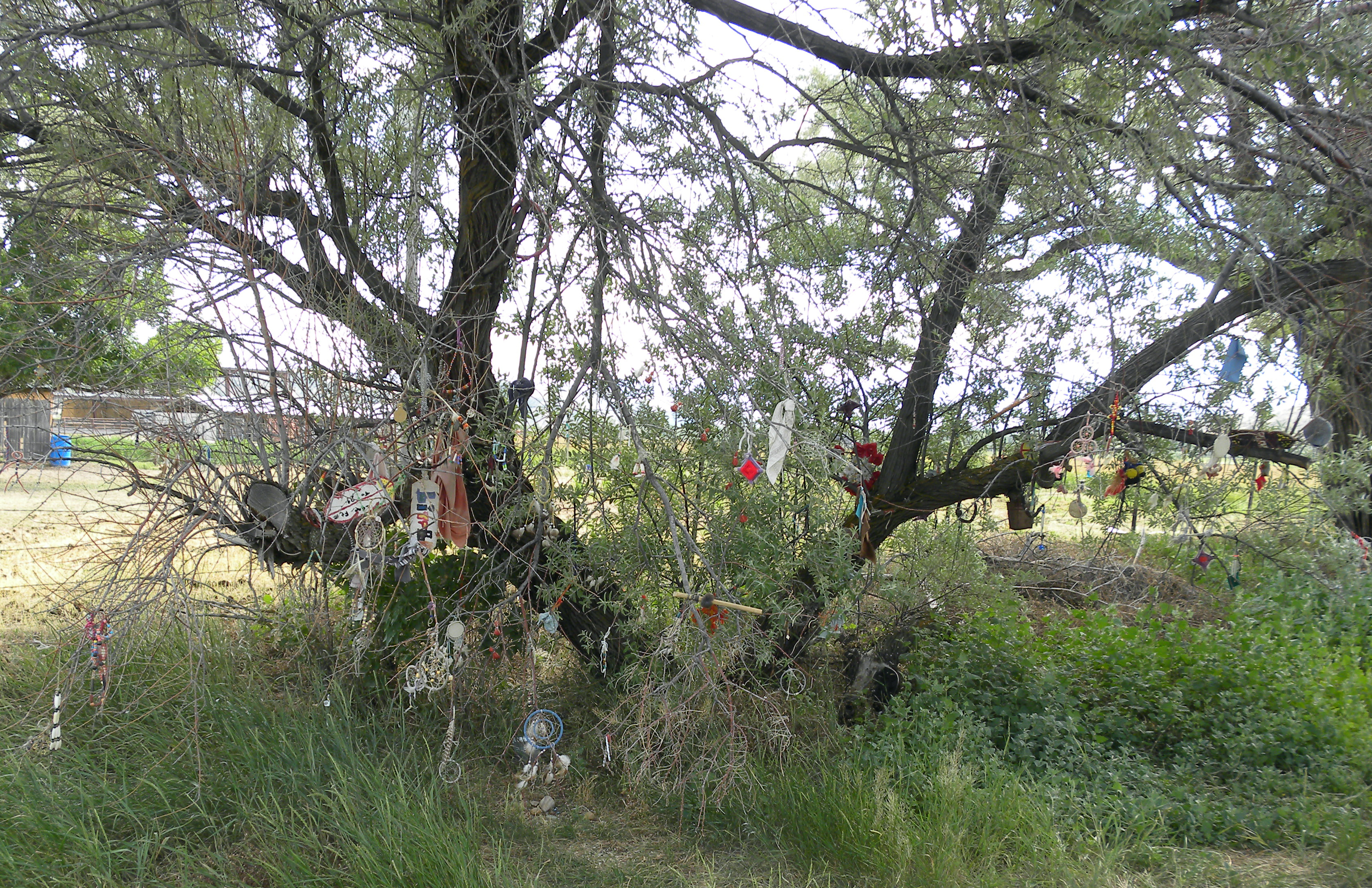
Shoshone prayer tree at Bear River Massacre site

The Bear River Massacre Site is located near U.S. Route 91. The site was designated a National Historic Landmark in 1990. The Northwestern Band of the Shoshone Nation acquired the site in 2018 to protect it as a sacred burial ground. They intend to erect a monument in memory of the massacre's victims. They are restoring the land by removing invasive plants and planting native plants.

The Smithsonian Institution repatriated two Shoshone human remains, that of a teenage man and a woman who was in her 20s when she was killed, back to the Shoshone people for burial. The remains were returned in 2013.

Little was known about the Bear River Massacre or the life and reputation of Patrick Edward Connor in his native County Kerry in Ireland. On Monday 7 August 2023 (August Bank Holiday Monday) local radio station, Radio Kerry, broadcast a 90-minute radio documentary entitled Gloryhunter, Kerry’s Indian Killer. The documentary sets out a detailed account of the massacre and Connor’s role in the dispossession and killing of first nation Americans in modern day Utah, Idaho and Colorado. It features interviews with historians and authors, as well as representatives of the Shoshone nation. The full documentary is available to hear on Spotify.
