= Utah Territory in the American Civil War =

The Utah Territory (September 9, 1850 - January 4, 1896) during the American Civil War was far from the main operational theaters of war, but still played a role in the disposition of the United States Army, drawing manpower away from the volunteer forces and providing its share of administrative headaches for the Lincoln Administration. Although no battles were fought in the territory, the withdrawal of Union forces at the beginning of the war allowed the Native American tribes to start raiding the trails passing through Utah. As a result, units from California and Utah were assigned to protect against these raids. Mineral deposits found in Utah by California soldiers encouraged the immigration of non-Mormon settlers into Utah.

== The U.S. government abandons the Utah Territory ==
As the war began in early 1861, the War Department pulled the Federal troops out of the Utah Territory and reassigned them to other regions where they were more immediately needed to quell the brewing rebellion. However, the void in military presence allowed the Church of Jesus Christ of Latter-day Saints (LDS Church) to regain control over the territory. Although the Mormons were the majority of settlers in the Great Salt Lake basin, the western area of the territory began to attract many non-Mormon settlers. Partly as a result of this, in March the Nevada Territory was created out of the western part of the territory. Earlier in the year, a large portion of the eastern area of the territory was reorganized as part of the newly created Colorado Territory.

In October 1861, the First Transcontinental Telegraph was completed, with Salt Lake City being the last link. Mormon leader Brigham Young was among the first to send a message, along with President Lincoln and other officials.

== The return of the Union Army ==
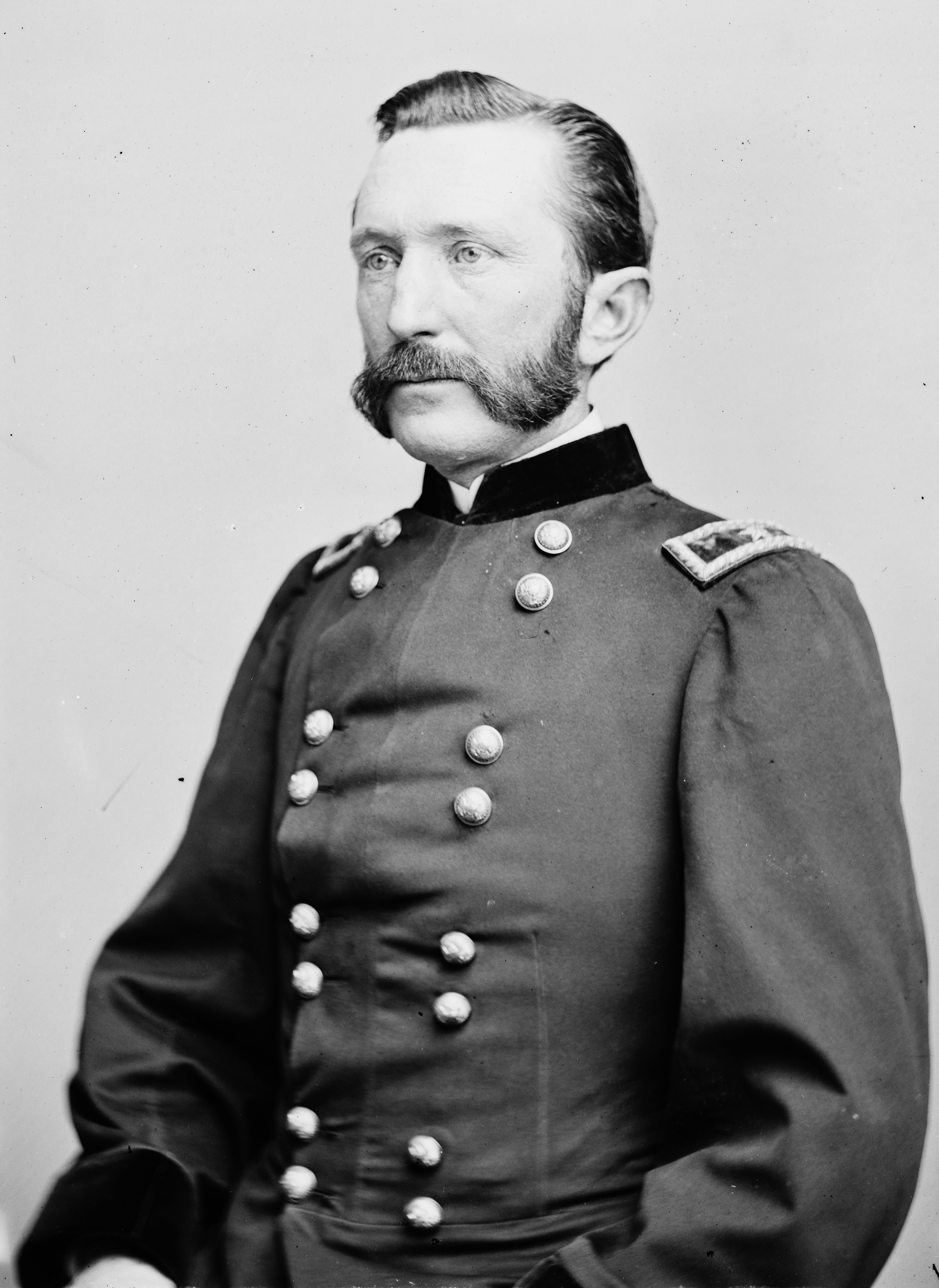
Patrick E. Connor, Union commander of the District of Utah during the Civil War

In 1862, with the ranks of the Union army swelled by more than 100,000 volunteers, the U.S. government believed it could now spare enough men to again occupy the Utah Territory. In addition, it was important to protect the overland mail route and telegraph lines along what later became known as the California Trail. Col. Patrick E. Connor marched into Utah with a regiment of California volunteers. His soldiers, of the 3rd California Infantry, constructed a small garrison just three miles (5 km) east of the Mormon stronghold of Salt Lake City. The post, named Camp Douglas for former Illinois presidential candidate and congressman Stephen A. Douglas, was officially established on October 26, 1862. Connor at once engaged in an acrimonious and bitter cold war with Brigham Young and the Mormon people, whom he accused of being disloyal and immoral. During the rest of the war, the fort served as the headquarters of the District of Utah in the Department of the Pacific.

The District of Utah was organized on August 1, covering the territories of Utah and Nevada, and Connor was appointed commanding officer. Besides the California units Connor led into the territory, the district was also defended by detachments from the 6th and 11th Ohio Cavalry, elements of the 4th U.S. Cavalry, and the 1st Nevada Cavalry Battalion.

The Shoshoni and other Native American tribal groups engaged in several small conflicts with incoming immigrant settlers in northern Utah and south-eastern Washington Territory (present day Idaho), particularly during the late 1850s and early 1860s. One incident in particular involving miners from Montana traveling through Cache Valley was enough to justify an expedition to investigate the situation further. Eager for combat, Connor marched his regiment 140 miles over the frozen winter landscape to deal with the Indians. On January 29, 1863, Connor's troops encountered the Shoshoni encampment along the Bear River. His men massacred the Indian encampment and then marched back to Utah.

Connor encouraged his men to explore the Utah region for mineral deposits, the discovery of which he believed would bring more non-Mormons into the territory, changing the balance of political power. His efforts were successful. His men discovered gold, silver, lead, and zinc deposits in Tooele County in 1864. As Connor hoped, miners began to flock to the territory. The Rush Valley Mining District was established by soldiers in the western Oquirrh Mountains and more than 100 claims were staked in the first year.

== Political leadership of the Utah Territory during the Civil War ==
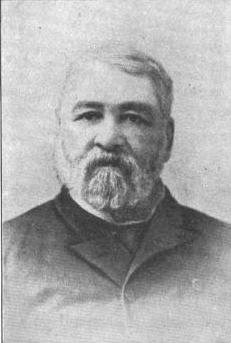
John F. Kinney, who served as Utah Chief Justice and U.S. Representative from Utah

Before the Civil War, John F. Kinney had been named as Chief Justice of the Territory of Utah by President Buchanan. He served from June 26, 1860, until March 1863. He was directly involved in the events leading up to the Morrisite War of 1862, and allowed a condemnation of Territorial Governor Stephen S. Harding to be read into the public record after Harding issued a blanket pardon for all Morrisites convicted in connection with the war. Kinney was elected as the Territory of Utah's Democratic delegate to the 38th Congress and served from March 4, 1863, until March 3, 1865.

In 1861, President Lincoln had appointed James Duane Doty to the position of Superintendent of Indian Affairs for the Utah Territory. In 1863, Utah's territorial governor, Stephen Harding, was removed from office after public backlash from his criticism of the LDS Church and the practice of polygamy. Lincoln appointed Doty to the governorship shortly thereafter. As governor, Doty was able to repair the relationship between the Federal government and the territory's Mormons.

Digital reconstruction of the flag that was flown in Springville to show support for the union on July 4, 1862

== Utah Civil War units ==
At the start of the Civil War, the withdrawal of Union Army forces left a void which several Indian tribes took advantage in order to start raids on the mail trails leading through the territory. To solve this, Young offered the government the services of the Nauvoo Legion, the Mormon militia organization. After discussing his offer with Secretary of War Edwin M. Stanton, Lincoln accepted the formation of a thirty-man cavalry company for ninety days; this was later expanded into a 106-man company. Although the company made several efforts to track down the culprits of the raids, it never saw any military action.

== Civil War Posts in Utah ==
- Camp Floyd, Utah, 1858–1861; renamed Fort Crittenden, 1861–1862
- Camp Douglas, Utah 1862–1878
- Camp Cedar Swamps, Utah, 1863
- Camp Bingham Creek, Utah, 1864
- Camp Relief, Utah, 1864
- Salt Lake City Post, Utah, 1865–1866

== See also ==
- History of slavery in Utah
- Act in Relation to Service
- Nauvoo Legion
- Soldier Summit: Named for soldiers who died there while trying to join the Confederate army.
