= Nefi =

Nefi or NEFI may refer to:

- Nef'i (1572–1635), a poet of the Ottoman Empire
- Nephi, a name use by several people and places in the Book of Mormon
- New England Fertility Institute, Fertility Centers Of New England
