= Camp Connor =

Coordinates: 42.6578°N 111.6261°W

Camp Connor was a Union Army outpost established May 23, 1863 by Captain David Black, 3rd Regiment California Volunteer Infantry, by order of Brigadier General Patrick Edward Connor commander of the District of Utah, Department of the Pacific for whom the post was named.

Camp Conner was located west of what is now Soda Springs, Idaho on the north bank of the Bear River. General Connor established the camp to defend the overland route to Oregon and the Morrisite settlement of Soda Springs he was establishing there. He intended the Morrisites would prevent the Mormons from expanding their settlements into this area and restrain the Bannock Indians. General Connor ordered the post abandoned on February 24, 1865, with the troops leaving in late April.
