= District of Utah =

During the American Civil War in the early 1860s, the District of Utah was a subordinate district of the U.S. Army's Department of the Pacific. The district was composed of territorial areas that later became parts of the modern U.S. states of Idaho, Nevada, and Utah.

== History ==
On August 6, 1862, the Department of the Pacific absorbed the District of Utah, the territory of the former Department of Utah which had been discontinued on July 3, 1861; the remaining troops had marched out August 9. The District of Utah was composed of the Territory of Nevada and the Territory of Utah. General Connor established its headquarters at Fort Ruby on August 6, 1862. After a visit to Salt Lake City he returned and on October 20, moved his headquarters to Camp Douglas, about three miles east of Salt Lake City, Utah where his forces could overlook and intimidate the Mormon leadership who he regarded as traitors to the Union. On August 20, 1863, the area of Soda Springs, Idaho Territory was added to the district. His District also provided a garrison for Fort Bridger. The Territory of Nevada became the State of Nevada and was admitted to the Union on October 31, 1864.

== Commanders ==
- Colonel Patrick Edward Connor August 6, 1862 - February 17, 1865 (Department of the Pacific)
- Brigadier General Patrick Edward Connor February 17, 1865 - March 28, 1865 (Department of the Missouri)

On February 17, 1865, the District of Utah was transferred from the Department of the Pacific into the Department of the Missouri. On March 28, 1865, the district was merged into the Department of the Plains, under Connor's command. On June 27, 1865, the State of Nevada and Territory of Utah became part of the expanded Department of California that also consisted of the State of California and the Territory of New Mexico and Territory of Arizona.

== Posts ==
- Mormon Station, Nevada 1849–1910
- Camp Floyd, Utah, 1858–1861; Fort Crittenden, 1861–1862
- Fort Churchill, Nevada 1860–1869
- Camp Schell, Nevada, 1860–1862
  - Fort Schellbourne, Nevada, 1862–1869
- Camp Nye, Nevada 1861–1865
- Camp Douglas, Utah 1862–1878
- Fort Ruby, Nevada 1862–1869
- Camp Smoke Creek, Nevada, 1862–1864
- Camp Cedar Swamps, Utah, 1863
- Camp Connor, Idaho Territory, 1863–1865
- Camp Dun Glen (1863, 1865–1866)
- Fort Trinity, Nevada, 1863 - 1864
- Antelope Station, Nevada, 1864
- Fort Baker, Nevada 1864
- Camp Bingham Creek, Utah, 1864
- Camp Relief, Utah, 1864
- Deep Creek Station, Nevada, 1864
- Quinn River Camp 1865
  - Fort McDermitt, Nevada 1865–1889
- Camp McGarry, Nevada 1865–1868
- Camp McKee, Nevada 1865–1866
- Camp Overend, Nevada, 1865
- Salt Lake City Post, Utah, 1865–1866

== See also ==
- California in the American Civil War
- Nevada in the American Civil War
- Utah in the American Civil War
