= Providence, Utah =

City in Utah, United States

- City
- Location in Cache County and the state of Utah.
- Coordinates: 41°42′12″N 111°48′48″W
- Country: United States
- State: Utah
- County: Cache
- Founded: April 20, 1859

Government
  - Mayor: Kathleen Alder

Area
  - Total: 3.88 sq mi (10.06 km^{2})
  - Land: 3.88 sq mi (10.06 km^{2})
  - Water: 0 sq mi (0.00 km^{2})
- Elevation: 4,695 ft (1,431 m)

Population (2020)
  - Total: 8,218
  - Estimate (2022): 8,995
  - Density: 2,116/sq mi (816.9/km^{2})
- Time zone: UTC-7 (Mountain (MST))
  - Summer (DST): UTC-6 (MDT)
- ZIP code: 84332
- Area code: 435
- FIPS code: 49-62360
- GNIS feature ID: 2411498
- Website: www.providencecity.com

Providence is a city in Cache County, Utah, United States. The population was 8,218 at the 2020 census. It is included in the Logan, Utah-Idaho Metropolitan Statistical Area.

== History ==
Providence lies 2.5 miles (4.0 km) south of Logan on former State Route 238. Its 1990 census population was 3,344. Situated immediately east of the confluence of Spring Creek with the Logan River, the town lies astride a delta at the mouth of Providence Canyon and beneath 8,881-foot (2,707 m) Big Baldy Mountain. The settlement was located on Spring Creek to take advantage of water, arable land, timber resources, and existing trails.

As directed by LDS President Brigham Young, on July 24, 1855, Captain Briant Stringham, Simon Baker, Andrew Moffat, and Brigham Young Jr., located headquarters for the Elkhorn Cattle Ranch on a spring of water near the west bank of the Blacksmith Fork River, immediately southwest of the present site of Providence. Subsequently, in the early spring of 1857, Samuel, Joseph, Aboile, and Nephi Campbell, and John Dunn, crossed the mountains from North Ogden into Cache Valley, seeking a new place to settle. To them, the town they called "Ogden's Hole" was becoming too crowded. They pitched camp at the present site of Providence, at a spring and pond where a creek from a canyon in the Bear River Range entered the alluvial lowland. To assess the fertility of the soil, the explorers broke sod and plowed a long furrow.

Plans were made for the immediate resettlement from North Ogden to Cache Valley of the Campbell and other families, but the move was interrupted by the approach of the U.S. Army with orders to force a military occupation of Utah Territory. The Weber County settlers evacuated their homes and moved south for temporary sanctuary on the "Provo bottoms", and the Weber County brigade of the Nauvoo Legion passed through Cache Valley to conduct a defensive reconnoiter of the Bear River region. A number of these men subsequently returned to settle in Providence.

Settlers finally came to Spring Creek on April 20, 1859. Arriving first were Ira Rice, a 65-year-old War of 1812 veteran from Massachusetts, and a 35-year-old Welsh coal miner, Hopkin Mathews, accompanied by his teenage daughter Elizabeth. They were joined by the English-speaking Bowen, Busenbark, Campbell, Clark, Clifford, Dees, Dunn, Durfey, Gates, Hall, Lane, Maddison, Rammell, Thompson, Williams, and Wright families, plus the Gassman, Lau, and Theurer families, whose native tongue was German.

Douglas fir logs were cut and dragged from Spring Creek Canyon to build cabins. The houses faced one another across a narrow road, which could be closed with wagons at each end to make a fort. On April 25, 1859, Peter Maughan visited Spring Creek to establish a religious organization. He chose Samuel Campbell as presiding elder. The first indoor meetings were held in a log meeting-and-schoolhouse erected by John Maddison and William Fife. By August there were 16 families living at the fort; the following month, a child (Hannah Priscilla Thompson) was born at Spring Creek.

On November 14, 1859, LDS apostles Orson Hyde and Ezra T. Benson organized the Providence Ward. Hyde chose the name: "Spring Creek settlement being situated in an elbow of the mountains and appearing to us somewhat of a providential place, we named Providence." Robert Williams was ordained as bishop. Two years later, when a U.S. post office was established in Providence, Williams was also named postmaster.

In 1860 John Theurer persuaded a number of fellow Swiss LDS converts (whose last names were Alder, Fuhriman, Kresie, Loosli, Naef, Stucki, and Trauber) to come to Spring Creek with its alpine setting. The Swiss tradition of community sauerkraut dinners continues to the present day in Providence. The village became a mix of Yankees, English, and Swiss, united by a common religious persuasion. As Providence was situated astride a Shoshoni trail from a winter camp on the Bear River to Bear Lake via Blacksmith Fork Canyon, church authorities advised that a more substantial fort be erected. A six-foot-high, two-and-one-half-foot-thick rock wall was built to enclose both the log houses and an open commons area.

On November 23, 1862, in the foothills just outside Providence, a two-hour skirmish was fought by 60 soldiers under the command of Major Edward McGarry of the U.S. Second Cavalry against 30 or 40 Shoshone under Chief Bear Hunter. The objective was to recover livestock and a ten-year-old white boy taken during the Utter Party Massacre on the Oregon Trail in August 1860. Three Shoshone people were killed and five others, including Chief Bear Hunter, were captured. An exchange of the captives was made for the boy, Reuben Van Orman, who had been held for two years.

In 1864 the town was laid out into square 8-acre (32,000 m^{2}) blocks, each divided into six lots of approximately one and one-third acres. East of Main Street the lots face north–south; they face east–west on the western side of town. The log structures, including the meeting/school building, were relocated from the fort onto the lots under the supervision of Bishop William Budge. On September 4, 1871, James Martineau completed his detailed official survey of Providence City. The cemetery was moved from the south end of town to a hill north of town. Construction was completed in 1871 on a rock meetinghouse and on a rock schoolhouse in 1877. The schoolhouse was replaced by a new building with a bell tower in 1904.

For more than a hundred years, the major activity of most of the people of Providence was farming. Irrigation canals were dug from the Spring Creek and from the Blacksmith Fork and Logan rivers. The livestock industry included the raising of beef cattle (1859), honey bees (1866), horses (1870), dairy cattle (1874), poultry (1918), and foxes (1928). The horticulture industry included growing grain and alfalfa; apple, cherry, pear, and prune orchards; and peas, beans, and sugar beets. Beginning in 1886 Joseph Alastor Smith established Edgewood Hall as a nursery and dairy operation on the bench overlooking Providence. After its 28-room manor burned to the ground on Labor Day of 1935, the 140-acre (0.57 km^{2}) estate was acquired by Wall Street financier and Logan native L. Boyd Hatch. An elegant formal estate was created by Hatch, but he sold out in 1953 to cattleman Theron Bringhurst.

The commercial activities of Providence included private mercantile shops of Rice, Hargraves, and Theurer plus a ZCMI Co-op store (1869–1912). Many years after the Co-op structure burned, Watkins and Sons Printing established a business in a remodeled and expanded facility. Other enterprises included molasses mills, a sawmill, lime kilns, brickyards, blacksmith shops, and an early automobile service station. The sugar factory of David Eccles and Charles Nibley began refining sugar beets in Providence in 1901 and operated for 25 years. Millions of tons of limestone for this and other refineries in the Pacific Northwest were quarried from Providence Canyon. The Utah Idaho Central Railroad Company extended its electric interurban line from Logan and established a depot in Providence in 1912. The railroad hauled limestone, farm produce, and passengers throughout Cache Valley as well as to Corinne, Ogden, and beyond via a connection with the Oregon Short Line Railroad company. Accompanying the UIC were electric lights, the telegraph, and the telephone. The last railroad train ran through town in 1947.

With the coming of statehood to Utah and with the population exceeding 1,000 in the 1890s, Providence was organized as a town corporation. In 1897 Hopkin Mathews became town board president. Providence became a third-class city on 19 July 1929, with James Hansen elected mayor.

Commencing with its first subdivision in 1962, Providence changed at an accelerating pace from a farming community into a "bedroom" suburb of Logan. Fields began to give way to developer tracts of individually owned, single-family houses on small lots. Although there is a spattering of home enterprises, most commercial activities have disappeared from Providence. A major employer of Providence citizens is Utah State University, which at its founding in 1888 seriously considered the Providence bench for its location. Other residents commute to Thiokol Corporation facilities or Hill Air Force Base as well as to smaller business firms and institutions in and around Logan.

== Geography ==
According to the United States Census Bureau, the city has a total area of 3.8 square miles (9.8 km^{2}), all land.

=== Climate ===
This climatic region is typified by large seasonal temperature differences, with warm to hot (and often humid) summers and cold (sometimes severely cold) winters. According to the Köppen Climate Classification system, Providence has a warm summer continental climate, abbreviated "Dfb" on climate maps.

== Demographics ==
Historical population
Census	Pop.	Note	%±
1870	481		—
1880	578		20.2%
1890	782		35.3%
1900	877		12.1%
1910	1,020		16.3%
1920	1,132		11.0%
1930	1,088		−3.9%
1940	1,110		2.0%
1950	1,055		−5.0%
1960	1,189		12.7%
1970	1,608		35.2%
1980	2,675		66.4%
1990	3,344		25.0%
2000	4,377		30.9%
2010	7,075		61.6%
2020	8,218		16.2%
2022 (est.)	8,995		9.5%

=== 2020 census ===
As of the 2020 census, Providence had a population of 8,218. The median age was 32.0 years. 35.0% of residents were under the age of 18 and 14.0% of residents were 65 years of age or older. For every 100 females there were 97.4 males, and for every 100 females age 18 and over there were 93.8 males age 18 and over.

100.0% of residents lived in urban areas, while 0.0% lived in rural areas.

There were 2,474 households in Providence, of which 45.6% had children under the age of 18 living in them. Of all households, 71.5% were married-couple households, 7.8% were households with a male householder and no spouse or partner present, and 18.6% were households with a female householder and no spouse or partner present. About 14.7% of all households were made up of individuals and 8.5% had someone living alone who was 65 years of age or older.

There were 2,532 housing units, of which 2.3% were vacant. The homeowner vacancy rate was 0.5% and the rental vacancy rate was 3.2%.

Racial composition as of the 2020 census
Race	Number	Percent
White	7,482	91.0%
Black or African American	19	0.2%
American Indian and Alaska Native	22	0.3%
Asian	107	1.3%
Native Hawaiian and Other Pacific Islander	42	0.5%
Some other race	163	2.0%
Two or more races	383	4.7%
Hispanic or Latino (of any race)	438	5.3%

=== 2000 census ===
As of the census of 2000, there were 4,377 people, 1,240 households, and 1,082 families residing in the city. The population density was 1,549.0 inhabitants per square mile (598.1/km^{2}). There were 1,290 housing units at an average density of 456.5 per square mile (176.3/km^{2}). The racial makeup of the city was 96.73% White, 0.14% African American, 0.25% Native American, 0.53% Asian, 0.09% Pacific Islander, 1.67% from other races, and 0.59% from two or more races. Hispanic or Latino of any race were 2.06% of the population.

There were 1,240 households, out of which 50.2% had children under the age of 18 living with them, 79.0% were married couples living together, 6.5% had a female householder with no husband present, and 12.7% were non-families. 11.9% of all households were made up of individuals, and 6.3% had someone living alone who was 65 years of age or older. The average household size was 3.51 and the average family size was 3.84.

In the city, the population was spread out, with 36.6% under the age of 18, 10.6% from 18 to 24, 24.6% from 25 to 44, 19.0% from 45 to 64, and 9.2% who were 65 years of age or older. The median age was 28 years. For every 100 females, there were 98.5 males. For every 100 females age 18 and over, there were 94.7 males.

The median income for a household in the city was $56,129, and the median income for a family was $58,856. Males had a median income of $39,306 versus $27,074 for females. The per capita income for the city was $21,201. About 2.5% of families and 3.2% of the population were below the poverty line, including 2.0% of those under age 18 and 7.5% of those age 65 or over.

== Notable people ==
- Nephi Miller, pioneer in the modern practice of migratory beekeeping
- Debra Teare, trompe-l'œil painter
