= Hobson, Nevada =

Hobson
- Ghost town
- Location within the state of Nevada Hobson (the United States)
- Coordinates: 40°04′28″N 115°31′58″W
- Country: United States
- State: Nevada
- County: White Pine
- Elevation: 6,020 ft (1,835 m)
- Time zone: UTC-8 (Pacific (PST))
  - Summer (DST): UTC-7 (PDT)
- GNIS feature ID: 862784

Hobson is a ghost town in White Pine County, Nevada, United States, in or near Ruby Valley. Hobson is the site of Fort Ruby, a National Historic Landmark.

== History ==
Fort Ruby, near Hobson was established in 1862 to protect the Overland Trail's important connection between California and the Union States during the American Civil War. It was located at the east entrance to the Overland Pass into Ruby Valley.

The population was 25 in 1940.
