= 3rd California Infantry Regiment =

Infantry regiment in the Union Army

3rd California Volunteer Infantry
- National color of the regiment
- Active: August 31, 1861, to July 27, 1866
- Country: United States
- Allegiance: Union
- Branch: Infantry
- Engagements: American Civil War; Bald Hills War (Co.A); Bear River Massacre

The 3rd Regiment California Volunteer Infantry was an infantry regiment in the Union Army during the American Civil War.

== History ==
The regiment was organized at Stockton and Benicia Barracks from October 31 to December 31, 1861, to serve three years. The regiment was first commanded by Colonel Patrick Edward Connor. After the formation of the regiment at Stockton, four companies were sent to Humboldt County during the month of November, 1861. During July, 1862, Colonel Connor was sent, with his regiment, to the District of Utah, where it remained for the balance of its term of service.

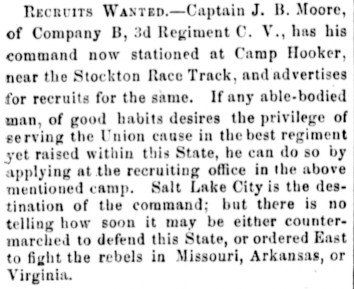
Company B, Recruitment ad

Its largest engagement was the Bear River Massacre or Battle of Bear River on January 29, 1863, in southeastern Washington Territory (present-day Franklin County, Idaho).

On the expiration of its term of service, the original members of the regiment (except men whose terms of service were not over) were mustered out, and the remaining men and new recruits were consolidated into a battalion of four companies on October 29, 1864. Known as the Third Battalion of Infantry, the battalion was composed of companies, A, B, C, and D. On December 9, 1865, Companies C and D were consolidated, leaving only three companies in the battalion. The battalion was finally mustered out July 27, 1866.

== Commanders (Regiment) ==
- Colonel Patrick Edward Connor October 31, 1861 - March 30, 1863.
- Colonel Robert Pollock March 30, 1863 - November 14, 1864.

== Commanders (Battalion) ==
- Lt. Colonel Jeramiah B. Moore November 14, 1864 - December 21, 1864.
- Lt. Colonel William M. Johns April 6, 1865 - July 27, 1866.

== Image Gallery ==
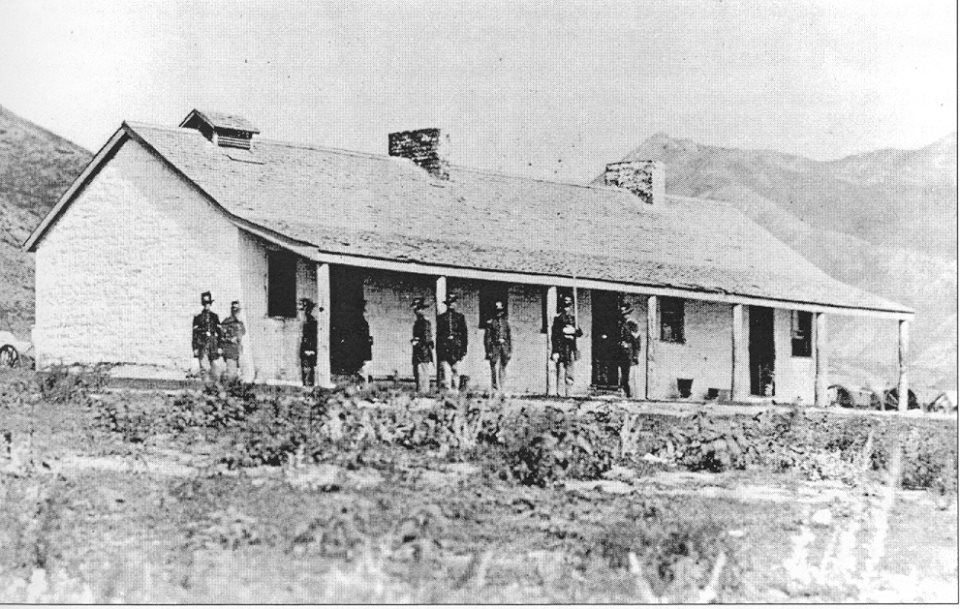
Soldiers at Fort Douglas Guardhouse, Utah Territory 1864

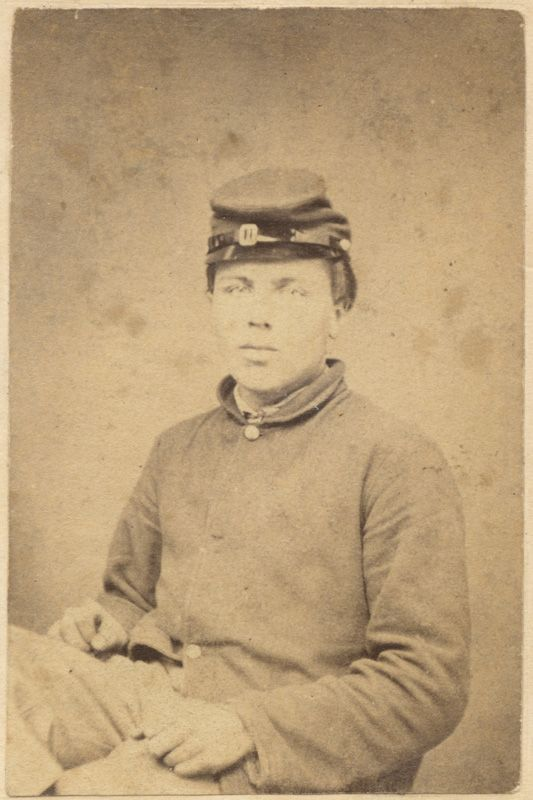
Private John Clark of Company E, photo taken at Fort Ruby, Nevada Territory 1864

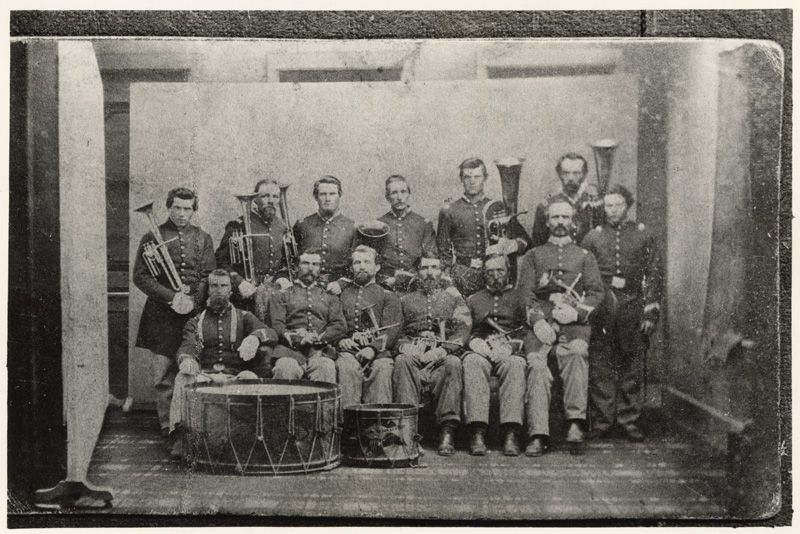
Regiment's band

== Flags ==
The regiment's officers were presented with a silk National flag by H. B. Underbill inside the Agricultural Hall in Stockton on 23 February 1862. "It was made for you, Colonel, and for the Third Regiment of California Volunteers. It was made to lead you on to conquest and renown. Victory must go with it, or it most never be unfurled to the breeze of heaven. On it is inscribed the name of your noble regiment. Let those silver letters never be gazed upon by rebel eyes except in the humility of defeat." In 1911 a small parade was held in the city of Fresno, and the flag was flown from a car with Captain Thomas E. Ketchen next to it.

In July 1862 a flag was made for Company A by the citizens of Hydesville and Humboldt County. On September 12 the flag was presented to the company. It was a 35 star silk American flag with the inscription “Fairly Won." After their service was up they gave the flag to the San Joaquin Valley District Agricultural Society. During Captain Ketcham's trip to Salt Lake City in 1909. He took the Company's flag and displayed it at the national encampment of the Grand Army of the Republic.

Company G carried their own flag. The flag was last displayed in a G.A.R parade in 1909 in Salt Lake City.

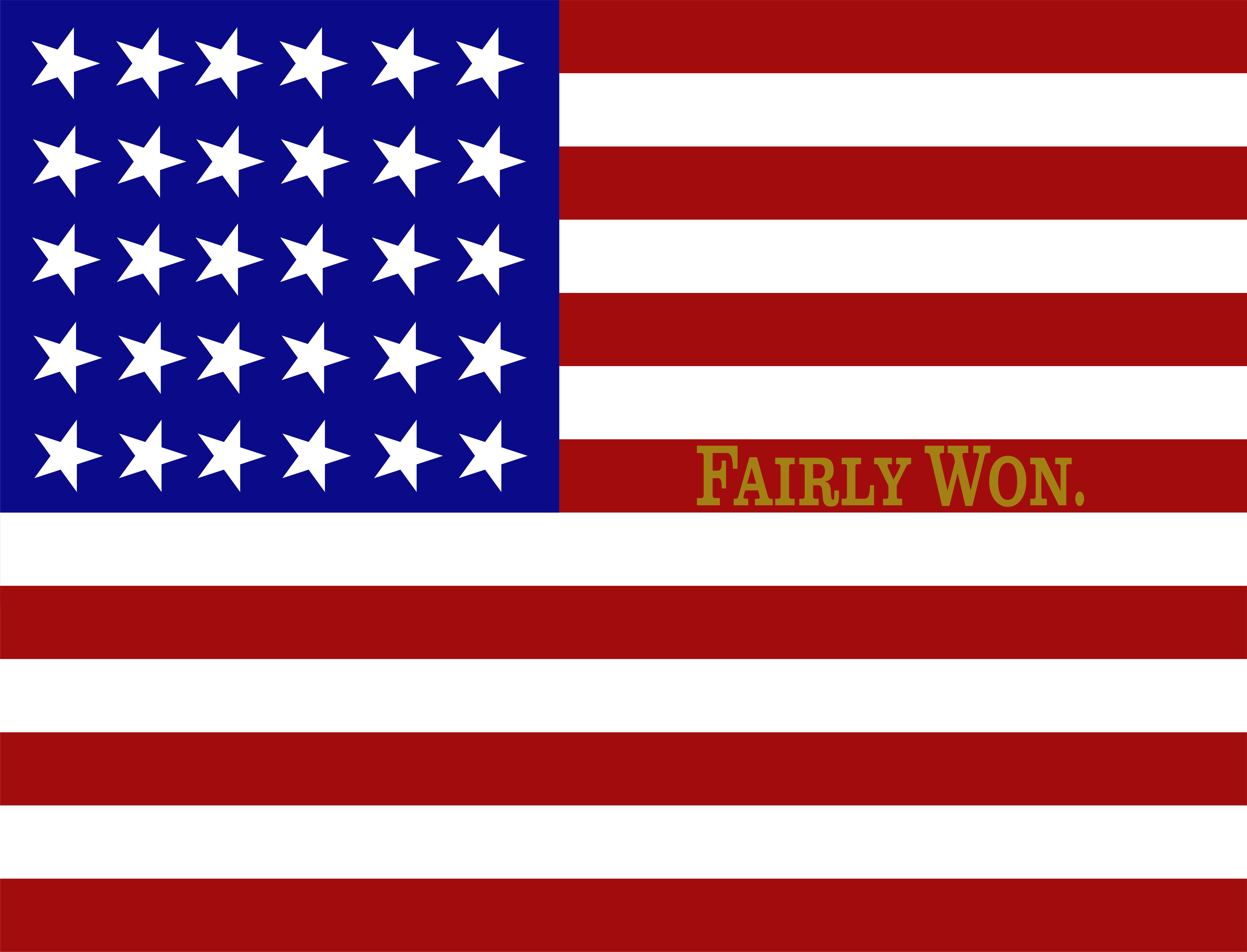
Digital reconstruction of the flag given to Company A after their field service in Humboldt County

== Company assignments ==
- Headquarters, was stationed in Stockton from the date of organization to December, 1861, when it moved to Benicia Barracks, where it remained until June, 1862. During July 1862 it was en route to Fort Ruby, Nevada, where it arrived August 1, 1862. Early in January 1863 it was at Camp Douglas, where it remained until it finally mustered out, July 27, 1866.
- Company A, was organized at Stockton, October 31, 1861, and was named the Fighting A, they went to Benicia Barracks in December, 1861. It went to Fort Baker, in Humboldt County, California, during the month of December, 1861.
  - On April 6, 1862, Captain Ketcham, with a scouting party of Company A, found the rancheria of the Indians that had previously robbed Cooper's Mills of two thousand five hundred pounds of flour near Yager Creek. The Indians had just fled, leaving seven hundred pounds of the flour, together with belting from the mill, mill files, baskets, bullets, lead, shot pouches, bullet molds, etc., all of which were burned, there being no means of packing them.
  - On the April 27, Captain Ketcham, of Company A, returned to Fort Baker from a scout to the southward of Van Dusen Fork, with twenty-four Indian prisoners, all women and children, except two young men. In attacking the rancheria four Indians were killed, including a woman, shot by mistake. During the scout Captain Ketcham came upon a rancheria which had been fortified by piles of logs around it, but which the Indians had deserted.
  - On the same day Lieutenant Staples, with a detachment of the same company, came upon a large band of Indians by surprise (having previously managed to kill their scout or sentinel without giving alarm); killed fifteen of them and took forty prisoners, three of whom he left behind, being unable to travel.
  - On May 7, Captain Ketcham reported eleven Indians came in at Fort Baker, eight men and three women. He sent out two of them as runners to bring in as many more as possible, assuring them of protection.

During July and August, 1862, Company A was en route to Salt Lake City. July 10 it was at Camp Halleck, near Stockton; July 31 at Carson City, Nevada; September 30 at Fort Ruby, Nevada; in February and March, 1863, at Fort Churchill, Nevada, and in January, 1864, at Camp Douglas, where it was stationed until June, 1865. It then went to Denver, Colorado, where it remained until October 1865, when it returned to Camp Douglas, where it was finally mustered out, July 27, 1866.

- Company B was organized at Stockton, October 31, 1861. Captain J. B. Moore's dog named “Abraham” became company’s mascot. The dog helped by entertaining the soldiers and guarding the captain’s quarters. It went to Fort Seward, in Humboldt County, California, during the month of December, 1861. July 10, 1862, it was at Camp Halleck, near Stockton. From February to June, 1863, it was at Camp Union near Sacramento. June 30, 1863, it was at Fort Churchill, Nevada. During the July 1863 it went to Fort Ruby, Nevada, where it remained until October, 1864. It returned to Camp Union, California, where the original members, whose terms of service had expired, were mustered out. The company was then filled up, reorganized, and sent back to Camp Douglas, where it remained from November, 1864, to June, 1865. It then went to Denver, Colorado, where it remained until October 1865, when it returned to Camp Douglas, and was stationed there until its final muster out on July 27, 1866.
- Company C was organized at Benicia Barracks, December 31, 1861. It immediately went to Fort Bragg, California, where it remained until the spring of 1862. In July they stayed at Placerville. While there Private Franklin and Private Benjamin were killed with a hatchet, after harassing a Cherokee ally. Then it went to Fort Ruby, Nevada, where it remained until August or September, 1863 when it moved to Camp Douglas. It was at the latter post until October, 1864. It then went to Camp Connor, in Idaho Territory, returning to Camp Douglas in May, 1865, and remained there until its final muster out, July 27, 1866.
- Company D, was organized at Stockton, October 31, 1861, and stationed at Fort Gaston, Humboldt County. In the spring of 1862 it returned, and was stationed at Camp Union until the summer of 1863. It then went to Camp Douglas, Utah, where it remained until its consolidation with Company C, on December 9, 1865.
- Company E was organized at Benicia Barracks, December 21, 1861. In February of 1862 It was stationed at Fort Humboldt, while there a soldier of English descent was arrest on mutinous and seditious conduct. During the summer of 1862 it went to Nevada and Utah and was stationed at Camp Douglas and Fort Ruby until its disbandment by consolidation, November 1, 1864.
- Company F was organized at Benicia Barracks on December 12, 1861. It went to Fort Ruby, Nevada, in the summer of 1862. In the spring of 1864 it moved to Camp Douglas, where it remained until it was disbanded by consolidation, November 1, 1864.
- Company G was organized at Benicia Barracks, on December 9, 1861. It remained at Benicia until the spring of 1862. It then moved to Camp Douglas, Utah, where it was stationed until it was disbanded by consolidation, November 1, 1864.
- Company H was organized at Benicia Barracks, December 12, 1861. During the spring or summer of 1862 it went to Utah, and took station at Camp Douglas. In May, 1863, it was at Camp Connor, Idaho, where it remained until it was disbanded by consolidation, at Camp Douglas, November 1, 1864.
- Company I was organized at Stockton, November 26, 1861. During the month of December it was moved to Benicia Barracks, where it remained until the summer of 1862, when it went to Fort Bridger, Wyoming (then part of Utah), remaining there until August, 1864, when it moved to Camp Douglas and was disbanded by consolidation, November 1, 1864.
- Company K was organized at Stockton, December 3, 1861. It moved to Benicia Barracks in the same month and went to Utah with the balance of the regiment during the summer of 1862. It was stationed at Camp Douglas during the remainder of its term of service. It took part in the Battle of Bear River in January, 1863. It was disbanded by consolidation, November 1, 1864.

== See also ==
- List of California Civil War Union units
