= Nephi =

Nephi may refer to:

== Book of Mormon-related ==
=== Texts ===
- First Nephi, the first subdivision of the Book of Mormon
- Second Nephi, the second subdivision of the Book of Mormon
- Third Nephi, the eleventh subdivision of the Book of Mormon
- Fourth Nephi, the twelfth subdivision of the Book of Mormon
- Small Plates of Nephi, part of the source material for the Book of Mormon
- Large Plates of Nephi, part of the source material of which the Book of Mormon is abridged from

=== Figures from the Book of Mormon ===
- Nephi, son of Lehi, a central figure from the Book of Mormon; founding king and prophet of the Nephites
- Nephi, son of Helaman; a Nephite missionary from the Book of Mormon
- Nephi the Disciple, son of Nephi and grandson of Helaman; a prophet from the Book of Mormon
- Nephi III, son of Nephi the Disciple from the Book of Mormon

=== Given name ===
- Nephi Anderson (1865–1923), a prominent early LDS fiction author
- Nephi Hannemann (1945-2018), actor and singer, LDS member
- Nephi Jeffs, contemporary FLDS bishop
- Nephi Jensen (1876–1955), LDS missionary, lawyer and member of the Utah House of Representatives
- Nephi Miller (1873–1940), beekeeper from Utah
- Nephi Sewell (born 1998), American football player

=== Places ===
- Nephi, Utah, a city in Juab County, Utah, United States

== Other uses ==
- A synonym for naphtha, a flammable liquid hydrocarbon mixture
- Nephi a character in Black Sigil: Blade of the Exiled
