= Statue of Patrick Edward Connor =

Statue in Salt Lake City, Utah, U.S.

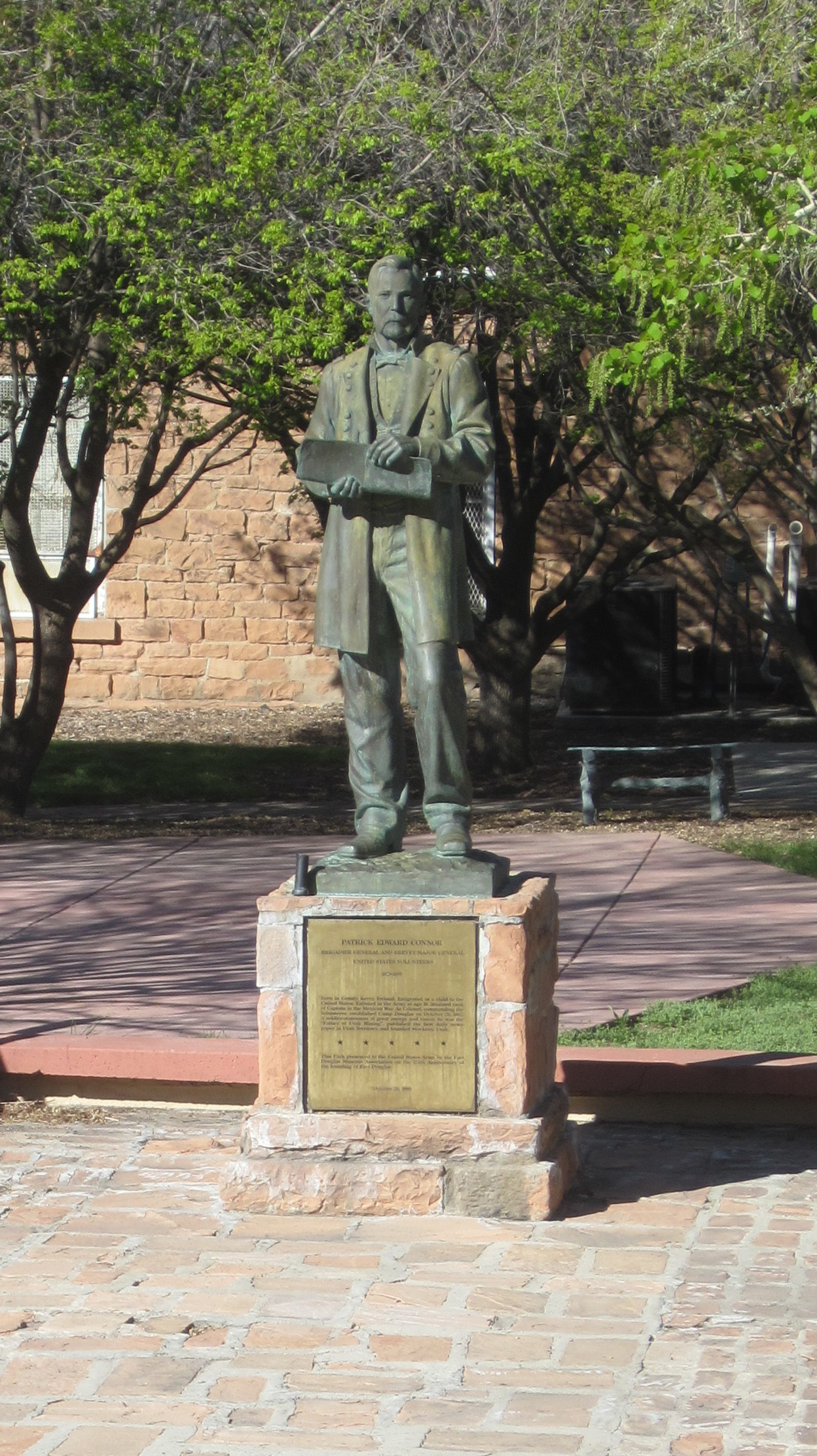
- The statue in 2021
- Subject: Patrick Edward Connor
- Location: Salt Lake City, Utah, U.S.; 40°45′51.8″N 111°49′58.4″W

A statue of Patrick Edward Connor is installed in Salt Lake City's Fort Douglas, in the U.S. state of Utah.
