= Bear Hunter =

Shoshone chief (died 1863)

- Wirasuap

Personal details
- Died: January 29, 1863 Bear River, Idaho
- Known for: leading Shoshone at Bear River Massacre

Bear Hunter (died January 29, 1863), "also known as Wirasuap (bear spirit)" was a Shoshone chief of the Great Basin in the 1860s.

On January 29, 1863, he and his Shoshone band (Northwestern Band) were attacked by the US Army in what is known as the Bear River Massacre.

In 1862, a Californian volunteer infantry led by Patrick Edward Connor established a fort on the Wasatch Range near Salt Lake City. In January 1863, they attacked Bear Hunter's village in an action known as the Bear River Massacre today. Bear Hunter was among those tortured and killed.
