= Montana Trail =

American wagon road from 1860s to 1870s

The Montana Trail was a wagon road that served gold rush towns such as Bannack, Virginia City and later Helena during the Montana gold rush era of the 1860s and 1870s. Miners and settlers all traveled the trail to try to find better lives in Montana. The trail was also utilized for freighting and shipping supplies and food goods to Montana from Utah. American Indians, as well as the weather, were major risks to traveling on the Montana Trail.

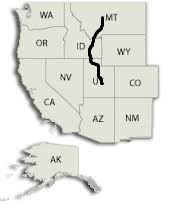
Map of the Montana Trail

== Immigrants ==
Montana was a very isolated area and the trail helped to keep Montanans connected to the rest of the United States. Salt Lake City was the only major city between Denver and the Pacific Coast and was a valuable supply and trading center for Montanans. The Montana trail was a much shorter version of the Oregon Trail and California Trail, intersecting the two trails at Fort Hall. It was one of the only trails to travel north to south, taking supplies from Salt Lake and driving them by pack train to Montana in the north. The trail went across eastern Idaho and passed through the Continental Divide at Monida Pass. The Montana Trail continued north and east through Montana to Fort Benton. It went through Utah, Idaho, and Montana and passed over mountains and crossed streams and valleys. Travel peaked during the mid-summer months when low water levels grounded steamships on the Missouri River.

Mountain men and traders explored the Montana Trail area in the 1840s and developed it in the 1850s and 1860s. In the 1870s miners, traders and settlers utilized the road until its decline in the 1880s. The Montana trail started in Salt Lake City and was an important supply point for the early years of the Montana gold rush. In July 1862, gold was discovered in Montana on Grasshopper Creek in Bannack City, in southwest Montana. Grasshopper Creek produced $5 million in gold and some outrageous rumors. People said that they could pull out a sagebrush plant, shake out the roots, and collect a pan's worth of gold.

Immigrants came to Montana in wagons, on horseback, and by foot. They were also able to take steamboats up the Missouri River to Fort Benton during high water months. From there, however, travelers had to take stagecoaches or wagons to the mining camps. Fort Benton boomed as a transportation hub during the high-water months. Many people traveled over overland trails because they were much cheaper than traveling by steamboat. However, this journey was much more difficult. People used pack trains, mule trains, and oxen on the trails.

== Interactions with natives ==
Overland roads followed traditional pathways that Indians had been using for thousands of years. Troubles and raids by the Northern Shoshoni slowed traffic in 1862. The US army halted these raids by establishing Forts to protect American pioneers. Not only were the Shoshoni hostile to freighters and emigrants in Montana, but the Sioux were also especially brutal to the pioneers. Over time, people were able to get military protection along the roads.

In the summer and the fall of 1878, settlers and freighters were fearful of the continuation of the troubles with the Indians. The worst involved freighters and Bannock Indians along the Lost River. In this incident, Indians killed the leader of the freight train as well as five oxen and three horses. In other incidents, Indians burnt haystacks, let stock loose and terrorized pioneers and settlers.

== Freighting and trading ==
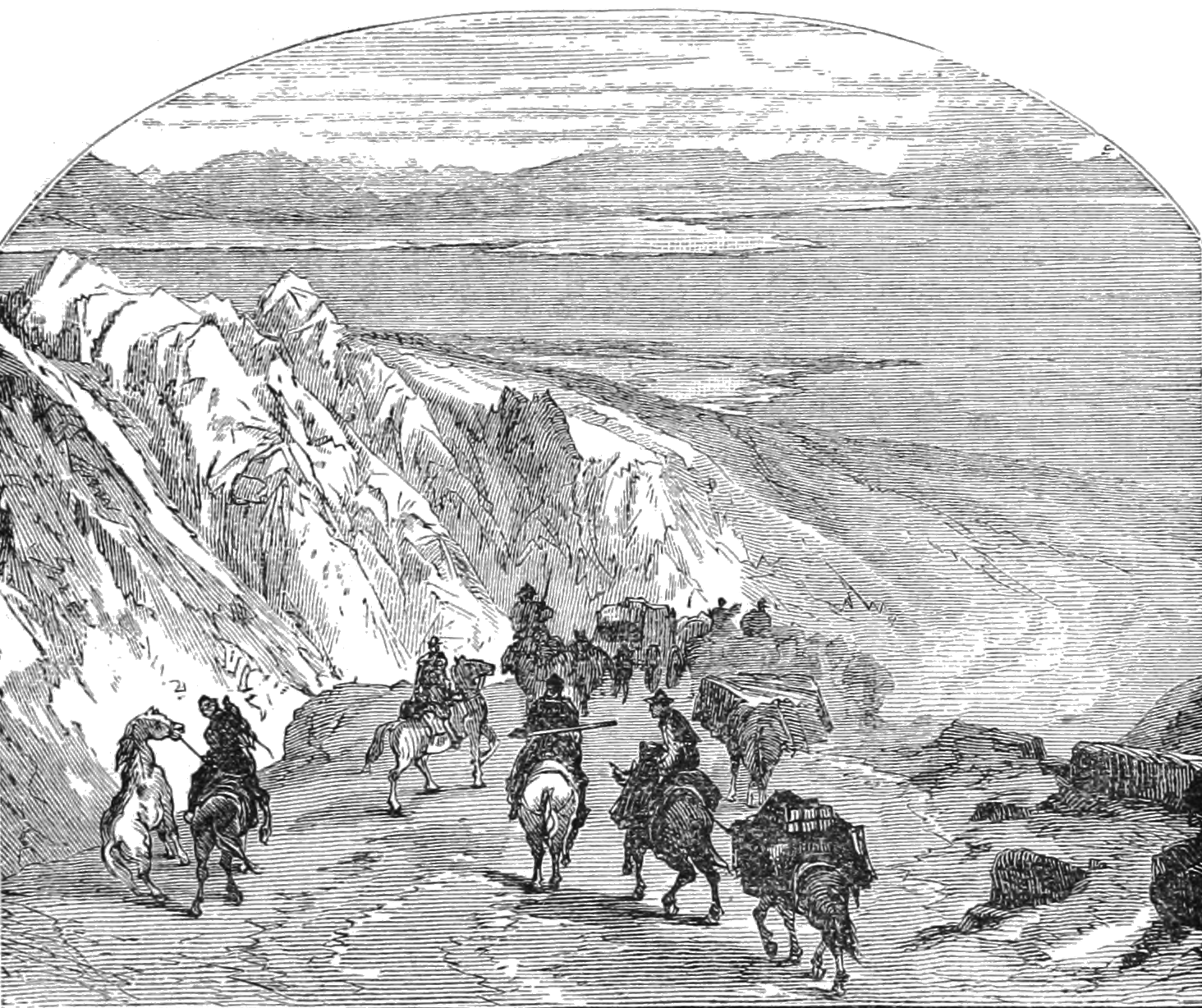
Pack train on the trail.

The trail was a main supply route for gold camps and created a lucrative trading network during the spring and summer months, generating a fierce competition between several entrepreneurs. One of these entrepreneurs was Benjamin Holladay. A stagecoach magnate, he lowered freight rates until the competition was driven out and then raised them to new heights He was able to drive out the competition by gaining a government subsidy to carry mail. When he realized that trains would drive out his business, he sold his company to Wells, Fargo & Company, which provided a flow of goods, carried passengers, and continued delivering the mail until the Union Central and Pacific Railroad Lines came into the picture. Transporting mail provided most of the company's profit, which made wagon leaders care more about the mail than their passengers, even though the company charged passengers around $150 for the journey. Stage coach companies also carried the mail and transported people to new towns in Montana. Bandits, bad weather and accidents did not stop the flow of goods during the 8 months of the year the trail was opened. Although bandits and indians infested the road and scared the travelers, only blizzards stopped the flow of goods when snow covered Monida Pass.

=== Mule skinners and bullwhackers ===
Freighting was one of the main uses of the Montana Trail in the 1860s and 1870s. Freight companies used the Missouri River as well as pack animals to move supplies. Typical pack trains would have 8–12 mules or oxen pulling 3 wagons weighing around 12,000 pounds. In April and May, the weather was more mild and grass would begin to grow as the long pack trains would begin their journeys north. Mule skinners typically rode the left-wheel mule and controlled the lead mule while bullwhackers walked alongside the slower animals, cracking their whips and yelling "Gee!" and "Haw!" The mule skinners and bullwhackers, although respected for their skill at driving the pack trains, were known as heavy drinkers and profane speakers.

=== Prices of goods ===
Farmers of the Salt Lake Valley developed a surplus of produce to help meet the demand of the gold rush towns, but as demand grew, farmers, merchants and freighters outstripped the supply. As the population grew in Montana, so did the demand for food like beans and fruit, as well as cloth and other goods. Flour was the most important staple that was transported along the Montana Trail as it was crucial to a healthy diet. Prices for flour and other goods fluctuated widely. Flour could be unsellable because it was too cheap, but four months later there could be no supply and a large demand. During the winter of 1863–1864, heavy snows caused a flour famine which resulted in the "Bread Riot" in Virginia City. Regardless, because of transportation and delivery costs, food was still very expensive. Bad weather and other transportation problems sometimes caused food shortages, and early snows cut off food supplies.

=== Tolls ===
Prices were also driven up by the costs of tolls. Tolls were required at many ferries, bridges and roads, but none of these tolls went toward maintaining the roads. Because of the disrepair of the roads, the journey took even longer. However, freighters and travelers had to use the tolls regardless because some of the most dangerous parts of the trail were manned by toll-owners. For example, the Snake River, which runs through Idaho, was very treacherous and scared many freighters and travelers. The expensive cost of tolls, along with the longer travel because of the lack of maintenance of the trail, contributed to higher costs of goods once they reached Montana.

=== Freight companies ===
Higher costs for food and other goods were also affected by the freight companies themselves which transported goods along the trail. The Diamond R Freighting Company, based in Virginia City, Montana, was one of the most important companies during the 1870s. Only four trips a year were usually planned by the wagon masters, and the lack of steady service drove up prices. On occasion, the return freight trains would bring rich ores, wools, hides, or furs from Montana. When the freight trains brought trade goods back to Utah, it brought the high costs of goods down slightly in Montana. Fast-freight and express lines were also established, but these services were only available at much higher rates.

== Demise of the trail ==
As the Utah and Northern Railway was introduced to Montana by the Union Pacific, ox teams and pack trains had to compete for customers because of the difference in time and cost. Wagon freighters had to work harder to negotiate new fares. Farmers flocked to the construction sites with teams to help build the rails, earning up to $2.50 a day. The Union Pacific Railroad was determined to get as much freight as possible and entered into contracts with local businesses for freighting on the Utah and Northern Railway. Businesses had trouble finding wagon teams to take goods north because prices dropped as low as $.04 per 100 pounds by June 1878. Because of the rapid increase in the use of trains, wagon teams declined slowly.

By 1879, most people were traveling to Montana by train, via the Union Pacific. Those that could not afford to travel by first or second class in the trains all the way to Montana were told to buy a ticket to Omaha or Lowell and continue their journey by teamster, or ox and wagon. They soon found out, however, that most of these wagons were too full to take them all the way to Montana. Although travel was much faster with the railways, it was still fairly expensive, which helped to keep the stagecoaches in business. This also contributed to the lack of smoothness in the transition from wagon trains to railways. Over time, the use of the trail declined as the railways shortened the trail by over 70 miles and created a much easier and less dangerous route to Montana. The Montana Trail still has a significant part in Montana history.
