= Nephi Miller =

Beekeeping Pioneer

Nephi Ephraim Miller (November 24, 1873 – June 18, 1940) was a pioneer in the modern practice of migratory beekeeping.

== Early life ==
Miller was born on November 24, 1873, in Providence, Cache Valley, Utah.

== Beekeeping ==
Miller gained an interest in bees as a child, while living on his father's farm. He was to inherit his father's farm and become a farmer, but his interest in bees grew, so he traded a few bags of oats, left over from the harvest in exchange for seven bee colonies. As the colonies grew and blossomed into a burgeoning business, Miller quit his job on a wheat-threshing crew and devoted all his time to beekeeping. As the number of his colonies grew, so did the by-products such as beeswax. At the time many industries were learning the value of by-products that previously had been considered waste and were discarded. Miller wanted to learn how to effectively clean the wax and traveled to California where he met M. H. Mendelson, an experienced beekeeper who showed him how to render the beeswax into smooth cakes.

While he was in California, he discovered that bees there kept gathering nectar deep into the winter months while his bees in Utah huddled together to keep warm, losing many bees to the cold. Once he returned to Utah, he decided his colonies would suffer fewer losses of bees and he could double honey production if he moved them to warmer climes in winter months. After much difficulty finding anyone willing to transport the bees, Union Transport Railroad finally agreed to carry Miller's bees from Utah to Colton, California in 1907. Other beekeepers followed suit, and the practice of cross-country pollination was born, making Miller the father of commercial beekeeping in Utah.

== Family ==
Miller married Harriet Ann Kidd (known as "Hattie") on November 18, 1896. They were the parents of seven children. At least one of Miller's great-grandchildren is still in the business of migratory beekeeping.

== Death ==
Miller died in Colton, California on June 18, 1940.
