= Patrick Edward Connor =

Union general in the American Civil War (1820–1891)

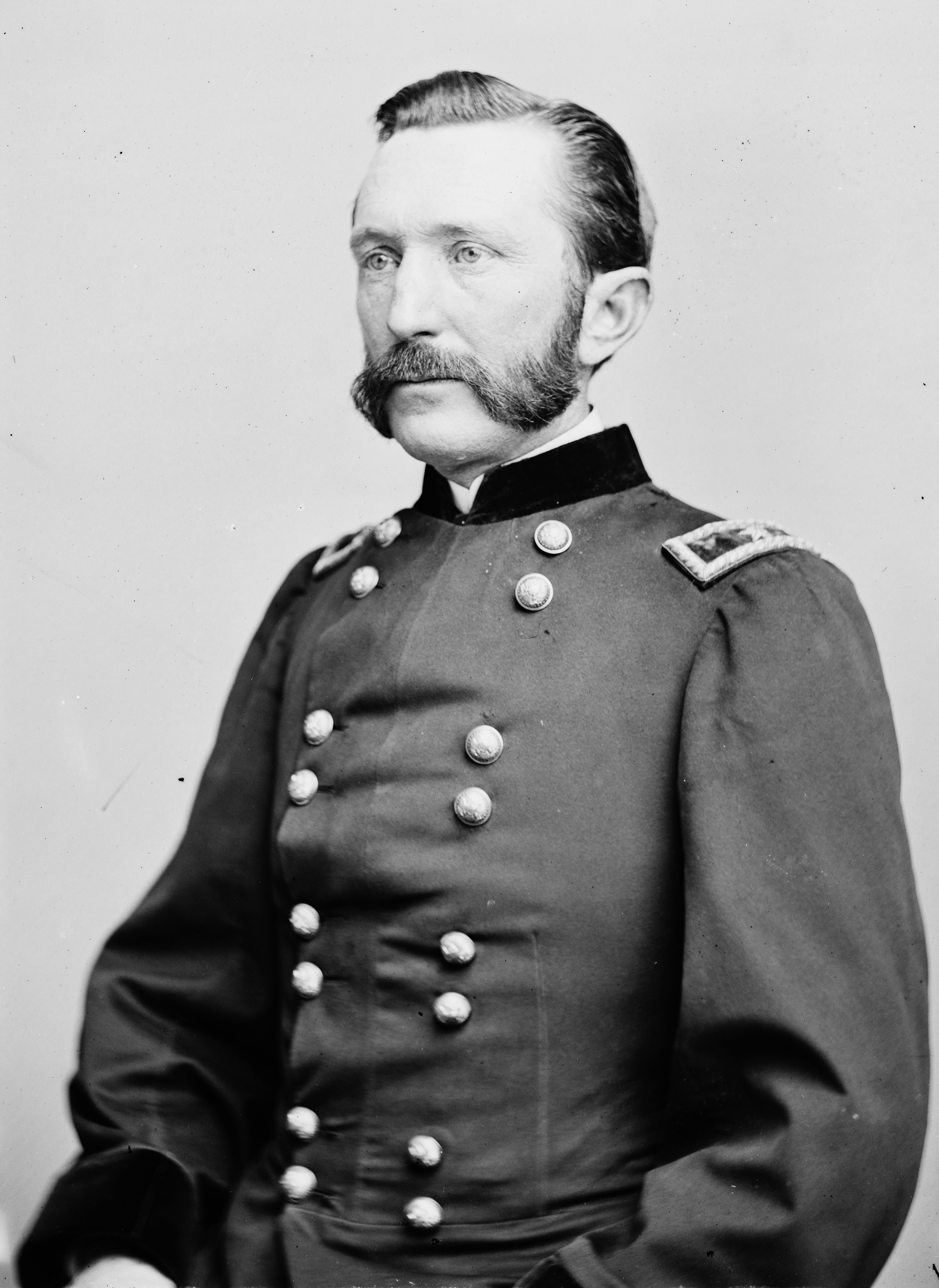
- General Patrick Edward Connor
- Born: March 17, 1820; County Kerry, Ireland
- Died: December 17, 1891 (aged 71); Salt Lake City, Utah, US
- Burial place: Fort Douglas Cemetery, Salt Lake City, Utah
- Military career
- Allegiance: United States (Union)
- Branch: United States Army; Union Army
- Service years: 1839–1844; 1846–1847; 1861–1866
- Rank: Brigadier general Brevet major general
- Commands: 8th Rifle Company, Independent Companies of Texas Volunteers; 3rd California Infantry Regiment; District of Utah; District of the Plains
- Conflicts: Mexican–American War; American Civil War; American Indian Wars; Seminole Wars; Bear River Massacre; Powder River Expedition
- Other work: California State Ranger

Patrick Edward Connor (March 17, 1820 – December 17, 1891) was an Irish-American soldier who served as a Union general during the American Civil War. He is most notorious for his massacres against Native Americans during the Indian Wars in the American Old West.

== Early life and career ==
Patrick Edward Connor was born in Ballyferriter, County Kerry, Ireland on St. Patrick's Day, 1820. He emigrated to the United States at 12 or 16 years old and enlisted, as "Patrick Edward O'Connor", in the United States Army on November 28, 1839. In addition to service in the Seminole Wars, he served as a dragoon at Fort Leavenworth, Fort Atkinson, Fort Sandford, and at the second Fort Des Moines. He was honorably discharged as a private on November 28, 1844, and after two years in New York, he moved to Texas. On April 5, 1845, he became a naturalized citizen.

=== Mexican–American War ===
Connor joined the Texas Volunteers in May 1846 using the name "P. Edward Connor", serving as a first lieutenant in the Texas Foot Riflemen during the Mexican–American War. On July 7, 1846, at Galveston, he was mustered into the United States Army as a first lieutenant, enlisting for 12 months. His independent company of Texas Volunteers under the command of Captain Charles A. Seefield was ordered to Port Lavaca on Matagorda Bay as a part of General John E. Wool's Army of the Center, which was slated to invade Mexico. Marching through Monclova, Parras, and Saltillo, the company, now under Connor's command as a captain, and attached to the 2nd Illinois Volunteers under the command of Colonel William H. Bissell, fought in the Battle of Buena Vista in February 1847. The company saw heavy action and Connor was wounded in the hand; two of his lieutenants and 13 men were killed. Connor was honorably discharged on May 24, 1847, near Monterey, Mexico, resigning due to rheumatism. When the California Gold Rush began, he crossed Mexico from Texas and arrived in California on January 22, 1850.

=== California ===
Upon his arrival in California, Connor was involved in a boating accident in the Pacific Ocean while attempting to establish a new settlement near the mouth of the Trinity River. Connor and his men were unaware that the Trinity River empties into the Klamath River instead of the Pacific. Of the 10 people in the whale boat attempting to navigate the heavy surf, five drowned.

On May 28, 1853, Connor was called by Harry S. Love to be his lieutenant in the company of California State Rangers with 20 other experienced Mexican–American War veterans. They hunted down and killed Mexican outlaw Joaquin Murrieta and three others of his gang and captured two others, breaking up the so-called "Five Joaquins".The rest of the Rangers and he were well-rewarded by the state before being disbanded.

== Civil War ==
When the American Civil War broke out, Connor was in command of the "Stockton Blues", a unit in the California Militia. He brought the strength of the unit up to regimental size and it became the 3rd Regiment California Volunteer Infantry. His regiment was ordered to the Utah Territory to protect the overland routes from Indians and quell a possible Mormon uprising.

While in Utah, Connor, as senior officer, became commander of the District of Utah, Department of the Pacific, on August 6, 1862, establishing Camp Douglas at Salt Lake City in October, but became discontented with his assignment. His men and he wished to head to Virginia where the real fighting and glory was occurring. When Major General Henry W. Halleck (a personal friend of Connor's) became the general-in-chief of the Union armies, Connor pleaded that his men had enlisted to fight traitors. He offered to withhold $30,000 from the regiment's pay to ship the troops to the eastern battlefields. Halleck suggested that Connor reconnoiter the Salt Lake City area. Connor did so and established Fort Douglas in a commanding position over the city, despite the wishes of the Mormons. Brigham Young tried through his personal representative to Congress John F. Kinney to displace federal troops. However, through the efforts of Governor James Duane Doty and Colonel Connor, federal troops were sequestered at Fort Douglas by Washington and the Pacific Theatre commanding general.

In October 1863, Connor and Governor Doty signed peace treaties with the remaining hostile Indian tribes, thereby bringing to a close all Indian hostilities within the Utah Territory. Shortly after the signing of the treaties, officers and enlisted men of the California Volunteers stationed at Fort Douglas established the first daily Utah newspaper called The Union Vedette. This newspaper offered a balance of news unavailable through the Deseret News, owned by the Church of Jesus Christ of Latter-day Saints.

Connor provided protection for non-Mormons and those wishing to leave the Church of Jesus Christ of Latter-day Saints during his three years of service in Utah. He also discovered valuable mineral wealth in Utah that was reported to his superiors. This led to the gradual immigration of non-Mormons into Utah that led to weakening of the power of the Church of Jesus Christ of Latter-day Saints on everyday affairs in the territory. Connor engaged in extensive military correspondence, which was published in 1897 under The War of the Rebellion: A Compilation of the Official Records of the Union and Confederate Armies. [Needs Citation]

Connor remained in command of the District of Utah until it was merged in March 1865 into the District of the Plains, established at his suggestion that a "Department of the Plains" be created which he would command. The new district, in the Department of the Missouri, combined the former districts of Utah (redesignated West Subdistrict), Nebraska Territory (East Subdistrict), Colorado Territory (South Subdistrict), and the Territory of Idaho (North Subdistrict). Connor was named commander of the new district.

== Bear River Massacre ==
In the early 1860s, population pressures in the Washington Territory near the present-day Idaho–Utah border led to conflicts between immigrant settlers and Native Americans. After an attack on miners with depositions given in Salt Lake City by the survivors, Connor marched his regiment 140 mi over the frozen winter landscape to "deal" with the Indians. From Fort Ruby, Connor instructed his troops to "destroy every male Indian whom you may encounter." On January 29, 1863, Connor's troops encountered a Shoshone encampment along the Bear River. Connor and his militia crossed the river and attacked the camp, then feigned a retreat only to encircle the camp and renew their attack.

Connor sent additional troops to block the Indian escape route through a ravine, and sent the rest of his soldiers on a flanking maneuver to a ridge, from where they fired down into the Indians. The soldiers also fired on Indians as they attempted to escape by swimming across the bitterly cold river. The troops killed nearly all of the Indians in the encampment, aside from about 160 women and children, who were later released and given some wheat to help feed them.

The Shoshone had been supplied by the Mormons and large quantities of wheat and articles of war were captured by Connor's command after the battle at Bear River. According to Connor, an Indian survivor later said that the large band of Indians was planning on destroying the town of Franklin in modern-day Idaho. Connor's dispatches are detailed in The War of the Rebellion: A Compilation of the Official Records of the Union and Confederate Armies of the Pacific Theater. Brigham Madsen's book The Northern Shosoni tells a different story.

== Post-war activities ==
=== Powder River Expedition ===
After the Bear River Massacre, Connor was appointed brigadier general in the Volunteer Army. From July to September 1865, he led the punitive Powder River Expedition against Sioux, Cheyenne, and Arapaho Indians who were attacking travelers along the Bozeman Trail and overland mail routes. Connor's 2,600 men were organized into three widely separated units, which traversed hundreds of miles of what would become Montana and Wyoming. As the expedition began, Connor's orders to his officers were, "You will not receive overtures of peace or submission from Indians, but will attack and kill every male Indian over 12 years of age." Connor's superiors countermanded this order.

The soldiers were harassed by Indians, who avoided pitched battles. Connor established Fort Connor, later Fort Reno, and destroyed an Arapaho village at the Battle of the Tongue River. His Pawnee scouts also ambushed and killed a band of 24 Cheyenne warriors. Most of the time, however, Connor's three units were on the defensive, fending off Indian raids on their horses and supply wagons, which left many soldiers on foot, in rags, and reduced to eating raw horse meat. On the whole, the expedition was considered "a dismal failure" carried out with "large, ungainly columns filled with troops anxious to get home now that the Civil War was over."

=== Later life ===
After the Civil War ended, Connor was appointed a brevet major general in the Volunteer Army and mustered out of the volunteer service in 1866. Never having been in combat against the Confederacy in the East, he continued to command troops on the frontier. He recruited Confederate veterans for service against the Indians.

Making his permanent residence in Salt Lake City, Connor established one the city's first newspapers. He also became involved in mining again. He founded a city in Utah and named it Stockton in honor of his California militia unit.

Connor died in Salt Lake City, Utah Territory, in 1891 at the age of 71 and was buried there.

=== Reputation in Ireland ===
Little was known about the Bear River Massacre, or of Connor's life and reputation, in his native County Kerry. However, on August 7, 2023 local radio station, Radio Kerry, broadcast a 90-minute radio documentary entitled Gloryhunter, Kerry's Indian Killer.

This documentary sets out a detailed account of the massacre and Connor's role in the dispossession and killing of first nation Americans in modern-day Utah, Idaho and Colorado. It features interviews with historians and authors, as well as representatives of the Shoshone nation.

== See also ==
- List of American Civil War generals (Union)
- Red Cloud's War
- Statue of Patrick Edward Connor
