= Fort Ruby =

Fort in White Pine County, Nevada, US

- U.S. National Register of Historic Places
- U.S. National Historic Landmark
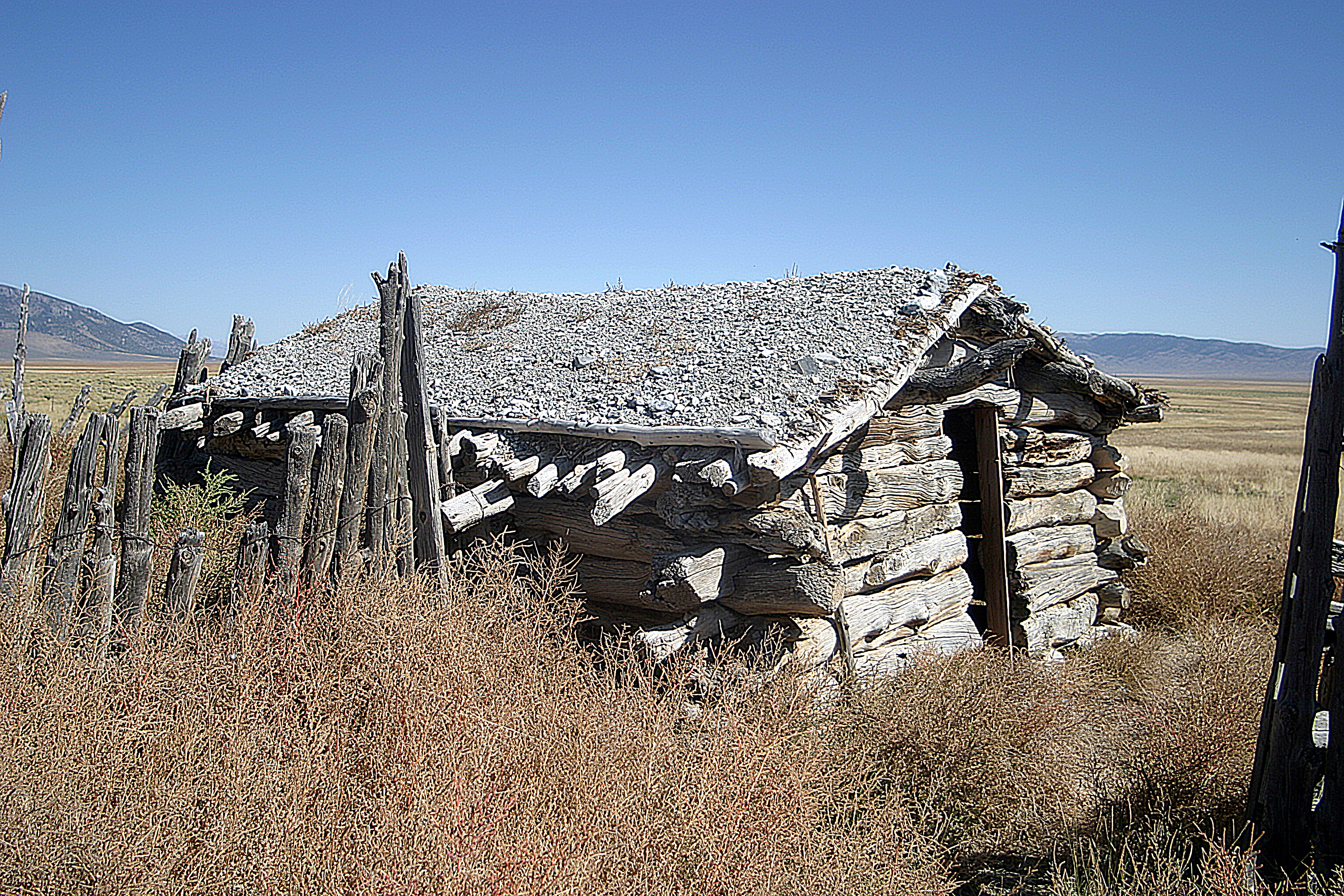
- A log cabin at Fort Ruby

- Location within Nevada Location within the United States
- Location: White Pine County, Nevada, US
- Nearest city: Hobson, Nevada
- Coordinates: 40°04′04″N 115°31′46″W
- Built: 1862
- Built by: 3rd Infantry, California Vol.
- NRHP reference No.: 66000460

Significant dates
- Added to NRHP: October 15, 1966
- Designated NHL: November 5, 1961

Fort Ruby, also known as Camp Ruby, was built in 1862 by the United States Army, during the American Civil War (1861–1865), in the "wilderness of eastern Nevada". in the region separated from the larger Utah Territory of 1850–1896, further east, then organized as the brief Nevada Territory of 1861–1864, (later admitted to the Union as the 36th state of Nevada in 1864). It protected both the California Trail and the later Overland Trail westward routes for overland mail and pioneer wagon route for stagecoaches and utilized for the short-lived Pony Express (1860–1861) horse riders with pouches of the United States Mail This was in order to maintain speedier links and communication between residents of the new state of California (admitted to the Union as the 31st state in 1850), on the West Coast on the Pacific Ocean and to the other states of the federal Union in the East. Later by the following year of 1861, the American-based Overland Telegraph Company with its trans-continental line was constructed laboriously at the beginning of the crucial Civil War, using the new 1844 invention of the electric telegraph, and subsequently the first of four transcontinental railroad lines in 1869.

The military post was operated 1862 to 1869, in territory dominated by bands of the Western Shoshone natives. The fort was located in the Ruby Mountains at the east entrance to the Overland Pass from Ruby Valley, near the now abandoned ghost town of Hobson on the west side of Ruby Lake. It is also near the Humboldt-Toiyabe National Forest reservation of the U.S. Forest Service. Currently in Elko County and adjacent White Pine County of northeastern Nevada.

To secure access and safe passage through this area, as well as to provide for construction of railroads and other needs, the U.S. government signed the Treaty of Ruby Valley in October 1863, with twelve chiefs of the Western Shoshone, who did not cede any territory. The U.S. also gained permission to conduct gold mining in this territory, as it needed gold in order to wage war against the rebelling southern Confederacy. It promised payments of annuities of $5,000 annually for 20 years to the Western Shoshone, in the form of goods and livestock, but failed to make any payments after that first year.

The military post site, which at the time contained several surviving log buildings, was declared a National Historic Landmark in 1961, and then five years later added to the National Register of Historic Places in 1966. Both of the lists being maintained by the National Park Service of the United States Department of the Interior.

Two of the four landmarked buildings on the site burned in a fire in 1992. Since the "log structures were in poor condition when this site was designated as a Landmark, and they have been altered and deteriorated significantly since designation", continued landmark status is under review by the Department of Interior.

The site was transferred from private ownership to federal control in 2002. Since then a joint archaeological venture to explore Fort Ruby's frontier legacy has been conducted by the U.S. Fish and Wildlife Service and the U.S. Forest Service.

== See also ==
- List of National Historic Landmarks in Nevada
- National Register of Historic Places listings in White Pine County, Nevada
