= Music of Idaho =

== Music Venues, Festivals and Institutions ==
There is an Idaho Symphony Orchestra, Idaho Falls Symphony Orchestra, Coeur d'Alene Symphony Orchestra (founded in 1981), Idaho State Civic Symphony, Magic Valley Symphony and a Washington Idaho Symphony. The Idaho State Civic Symphony is the oldest in the state, having been founded in the early 1900s.

The Treefort Music Fest, founded in 2014, many independent bands from the area, in addition to attracting established acts from outside Boise. Other active music festivals include Braun Brothers Reunion in Challis, Idaho and the Boise Music Festival.

Notably, every year the University of Idaho holds the annual Lionel Hampton Jazz Festival, in which schools from all over the world, as well as famous musicians, come to celebrate Jazz as an art form. A similar event is held at Boise State University, called the Gene Harris Jazz Festival.

Small and large venues exist throughout downtown Boise, though the former consists of mostly bars and coffee shops, and the larger remain concert halls and arenas. Perhaps the most popular concert house is the Knitting Factory (formerly the Big Easy), as well as The Olympic, which caters to the alternative, indie, and metal music. Although many famous artists and musicians play in Boise, many acts pass up Boise in favor of venues in Salt Lake City, Seattle, or Portland, Oregon.

Major music venues include the L.E. and Thelma E. Stephens Performing Arts Center at Idaho State University in Pocatello.

Idaho Falls and its region is home to a small number of venues. A few include Mountain America Center, Steele-N-Jo's Bone, Colonial Theatre (Idaho Falls, Idaho), and the Celt.

Rexburg, Idaho also has a budding local music scene, with many of the bands being formed by students at Brigham Young University–Idaho.

The town of Weiser has held fiddling contests since the 1890s, when the instrument arrived in Idaho on the Oregon Trail. Since the early 1950s, Weiser has been home to the National Oldtime Fiddlers' Contest, held in June and hosting more than 20,000 people a year. The late Kevin Sharp who had a hit song with "Nobody Knows but Me" lived in Weiser, Idaho and then moved to Los Angeles. Idaho is also home to the National Oldtime Fiddlers' Hall of Fame.

== Notable Idaho Musicians/Bands ==
- Nikki Sixx – bassist of glam metal band Mötley Crüe grew up in Jerome, Idaho
- Victor Wooten - Grammy Award- winning jazz fusion bassist born in Mountain Home, Idaho
- Gary Peacock – jazz double bassist born in Burley, Idaho
- Paul Revere & the Raiders – critically acclaimed 60's Pop rock band
- Curtis Stigers - Platinum selling jazz singer from Boise, Idaho
- Christian Jacobs - member of The Aquabats and co-creator of Yo Gabba Gabba! from Rexburg, Idaho
- Gregg Hale — guitar player for British band Spiritualized from Idaho Falls, Idaho
- Shook Twins - folk music group from Sandpoint, Idaho
- Built to Spill – Boise, Idaho based Indie rock band
- Treepeople – Alternative rock band
- Rosalie Sorrels – singer-songwriter and storyteller
- Eilen Jewell - folk singer
- La Monte Young – Minimalist composer born in Bern, Idaho
- Josh Ritter – folk/country/indie songwriter from Moscow, Idaho
- Reckless Kelly – country rock collective originally from Challis, Idaho
- Branden Steineckert - drummer for Rancid and The Used from Pocatello, Idaho
