= Idaho Falls Public Library =

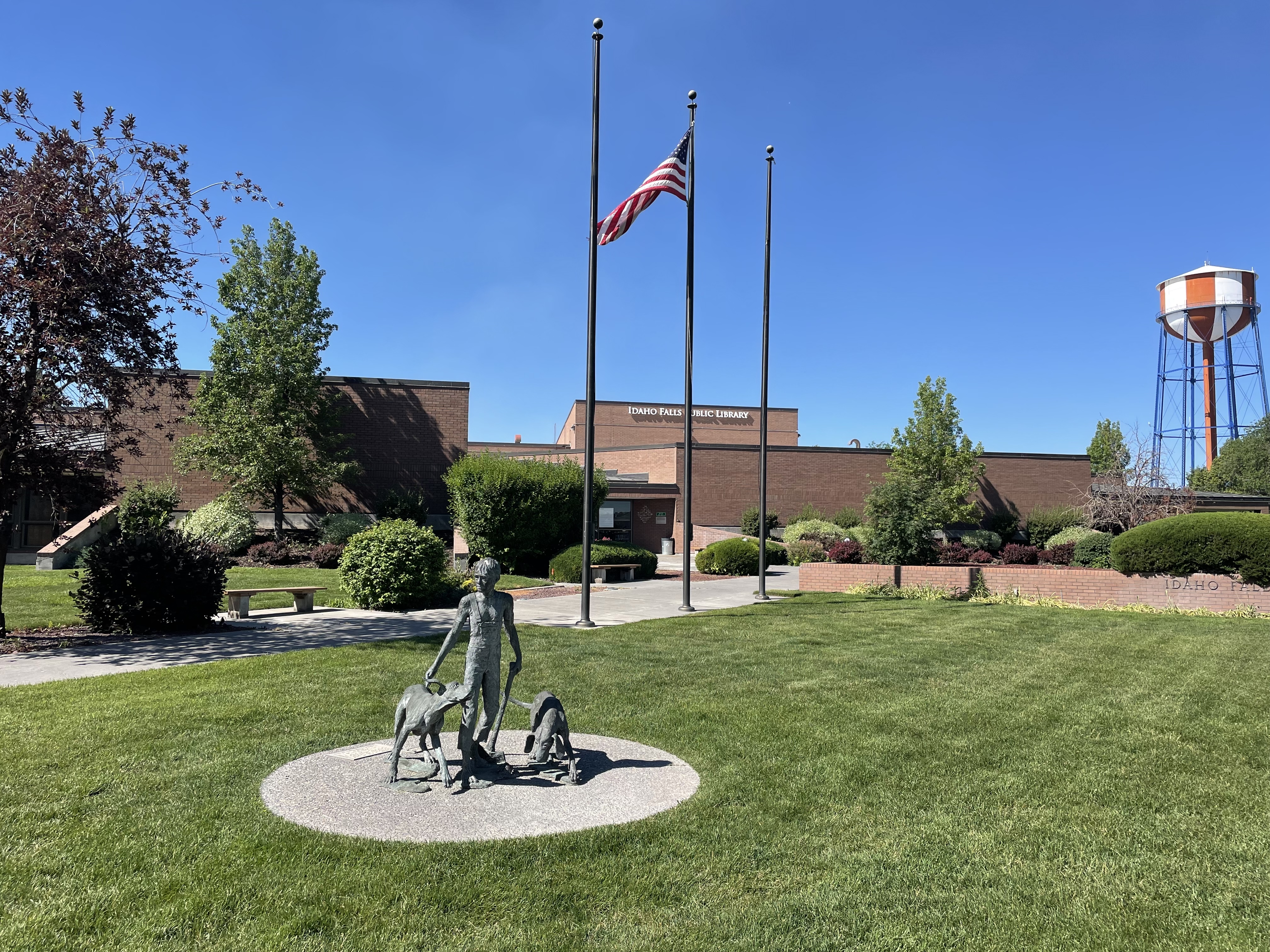
Idaho Falls Public Library in 2021

The Idaho Falls Public Library, at Elm and Eastern Streets in Idaho Falls, Idaho, was built in 1916 as a Carnegie library and was expanded later. The library operated here until 1977 when it moved a few blocks away. The historic building was listed on the National Register of Historic Places in 1984. It later became part of a new Museum of Idaho. The modern library is located at 457 West Broadway in Idaho Falls.

== Historic building ==
- Idaho Falls Public Library
- U.S. National Register of Historic Places
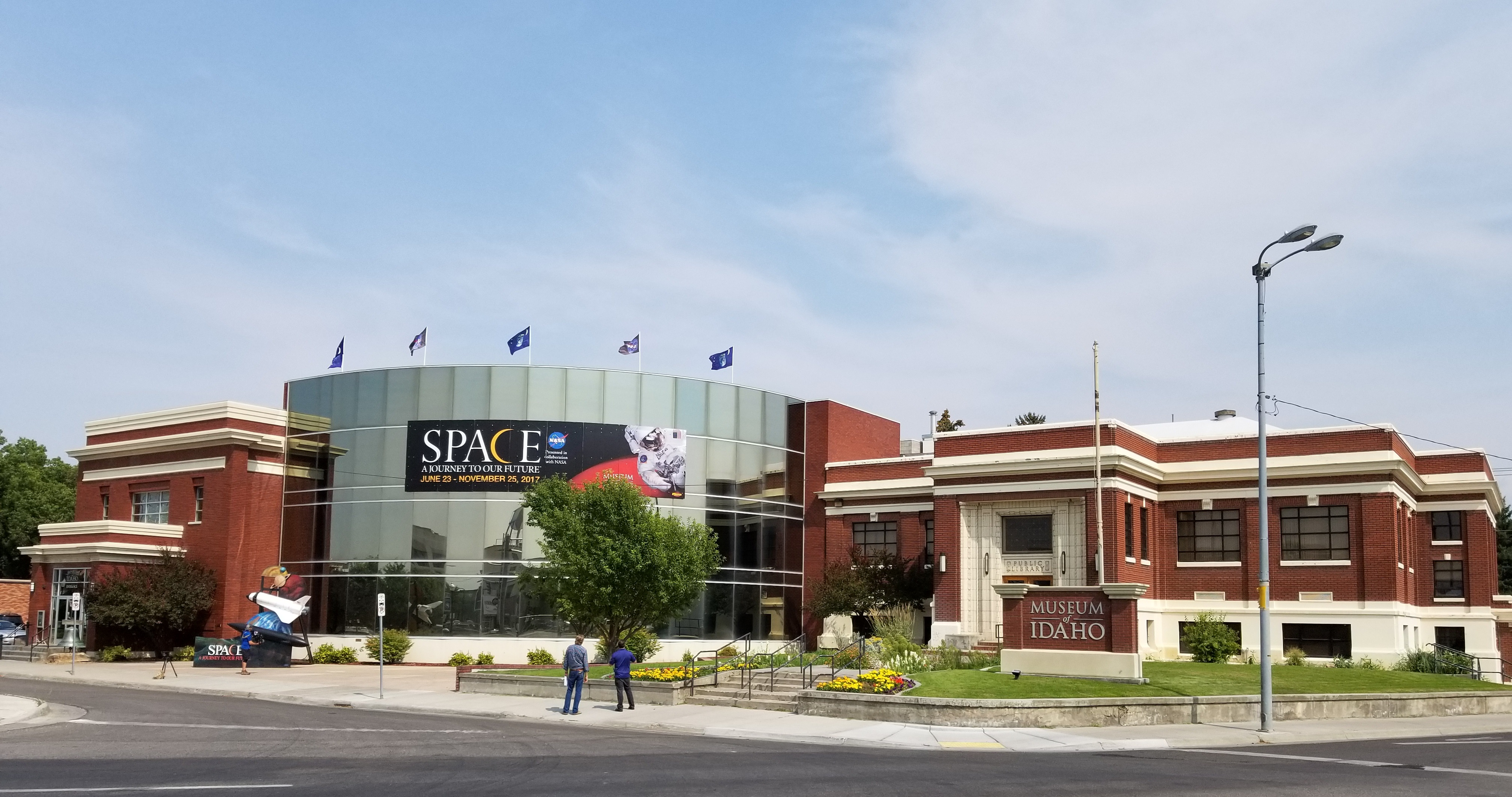
- Historic library's 1938-1940 tripartite facade is at right, in what is now larger Museum of Idaho complex.

- Location within Idaho
- Location: Elm and Eastern Sts., Idaho Falls, Idaho
- Coordinates: 43°29′25″N 112°02′14″W
- Area: less than one acre
- Built: 1916, 1938-40
- Architect: Wayland & Fennell
- Architectural style: Renaissance Revival, Art Deco
- MPS: Idaho Falls Downtown MRA
- NRHP reference No.: 84001093
- Added to NRHP: August 30, 1984

The historic building is a one-story red brick building upon a raised basement story, with original portion built in 1916 in Renaissance Revival style. The central projecting entrance pavilion, in Art Deco style, and other changes were implemented in 1938-40 as part of a Public Works Administration project.

Its nomination document describes it as "historically significant for its association with a group of prominent Idaho Falls women who in 1898 formed an organization to improve the quality and appearance of the town in which they lived. They called themselves the Village Improvement Society and embarked on a crusade to beautify Idaho Falls. Their achievements included establishment of city parks, planting trees along then barren streets, and founding the city's public library. The library was originally housed in the basement of the Baptist church, but the VIS soon set out to obtain a grant from the Carnegie Library Foundation for the construction of a library building. In 1905, Andrew Carnegie pledged the sum of $10,000 for the city of Idaho Falls to commission a building for the public library. The building was completed in 1916. At this time the population of the city was 6,000 persons. By 1938, the population had risen to 15,000 and the size and quality of the building had become inadequate. The city, in conjunction with the Public Works Administration, began a remodeling project to modernize and enlarge the existing structure. At a cost of $70,000, the structure was reinforced to withstand earthquakes and fire, the electrical and mechanical systems were updated, and the size was increased to 12,500 square feet."
