= Johnson–Kearns Hotel =

Historic hotel in Springville, Utah, United States

- U.S. National Register of Historic Places
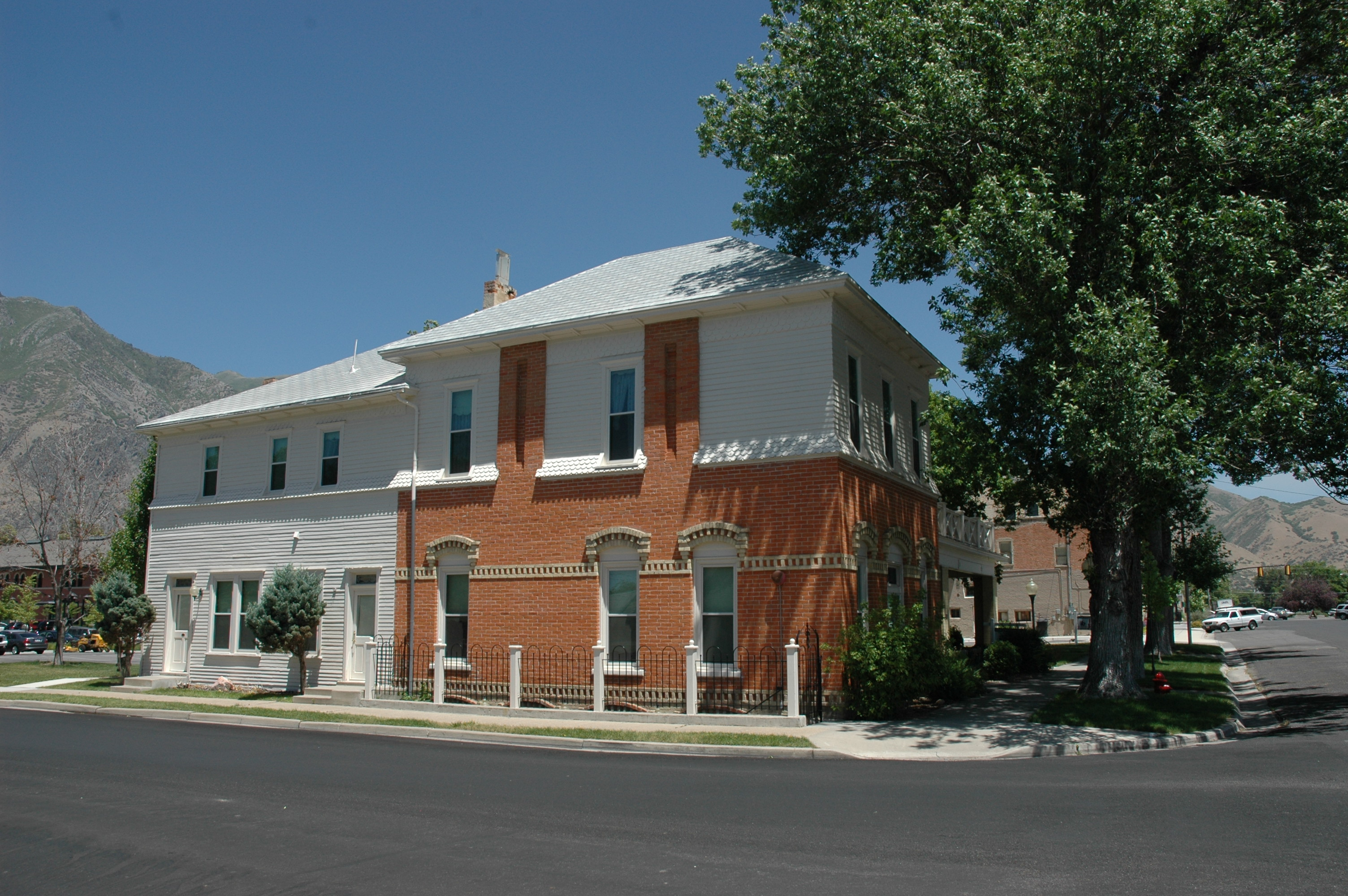
- Johnson–Kearns Hotel, June 2012

- Location within Utah Location within the United States
- Location: 94 West 200 South; Springville, Utah; United States
- Coordinates: 40°9′52″N 111°36′40″W
- Area: 0.3 acres (0.12 ha)
- Built: 1892
- Architectural style: Late Victorian
- MPS: Springville MPS
- NRHP reference No.: 97001571
- Added to NRHP: January 5, 1998

The Johnson–Kearns Hotel (now known and operated as the Art City Inn) is a historic hotel in downtown Springville, Utah, United States, that is listed on the National Register of Historic Places (NRHP).

== Description ==
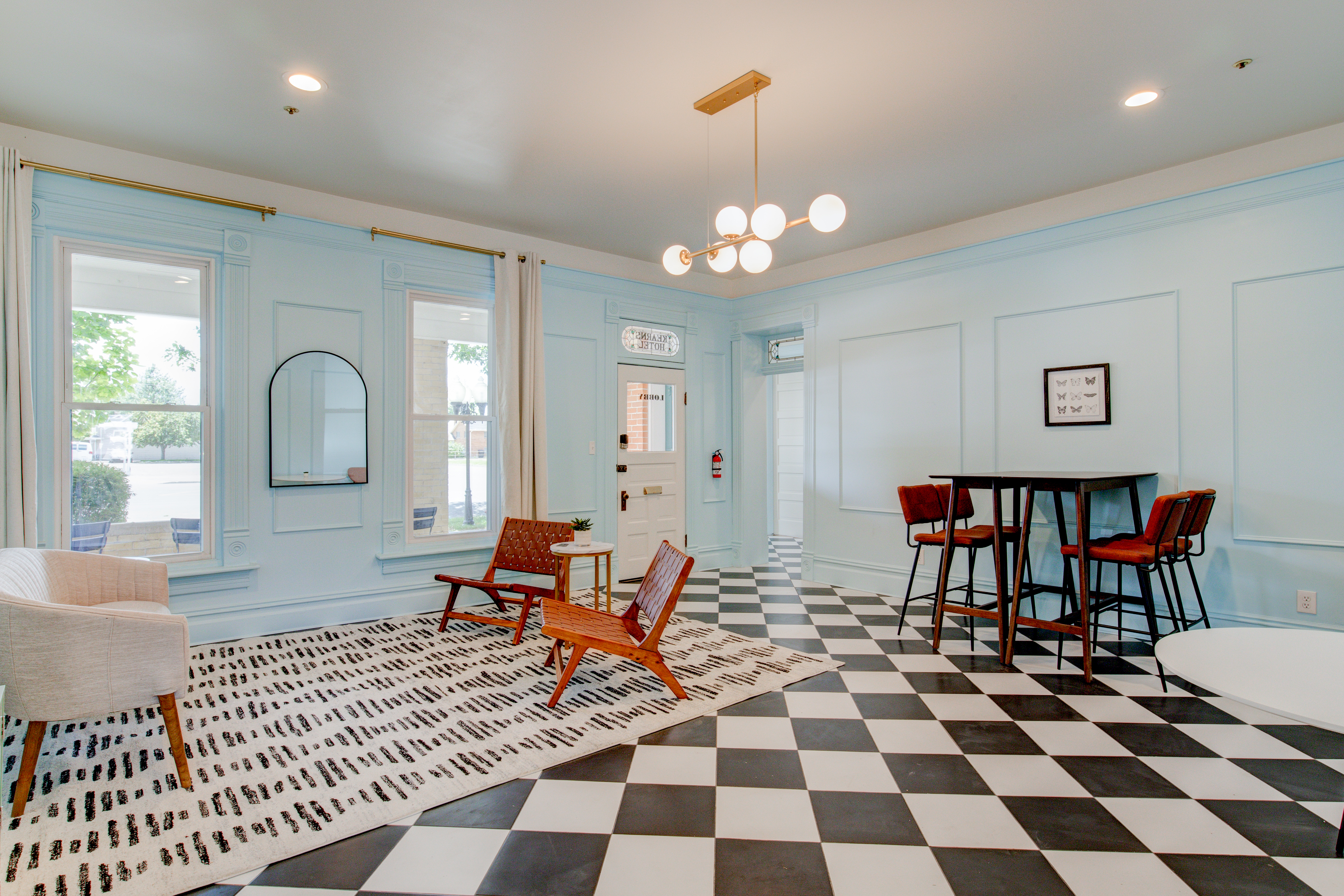
Art City Inn Lobby, July 2022

The hotel is located at 94 West 200 South on the western edge of the city's downtown commercial district and just over three blocks east of one Springville's two former railroad depots (which was at the west end of West 200 South and was owned by what eventually became the Denver and Rio Grande Western Railroad). While located within the Springville Historic District (which was added to the NRHP in 2004), the hotel is an individually listed contributing property to the district.

The building includes Late Victorian architecture and has been known at times as the Johnson Hotel, the Kearns House. the Kearns Hotel, the Manitou Hotel, the Valley Tavern Hotel, and the Valley Hotel. The room layout of the interior is consistent with use as a hotel, having highly compartmentalized areas, with a private living section for the owner and public spaces on the first floor and guest rooms on the second floor and the basement.

== History ==
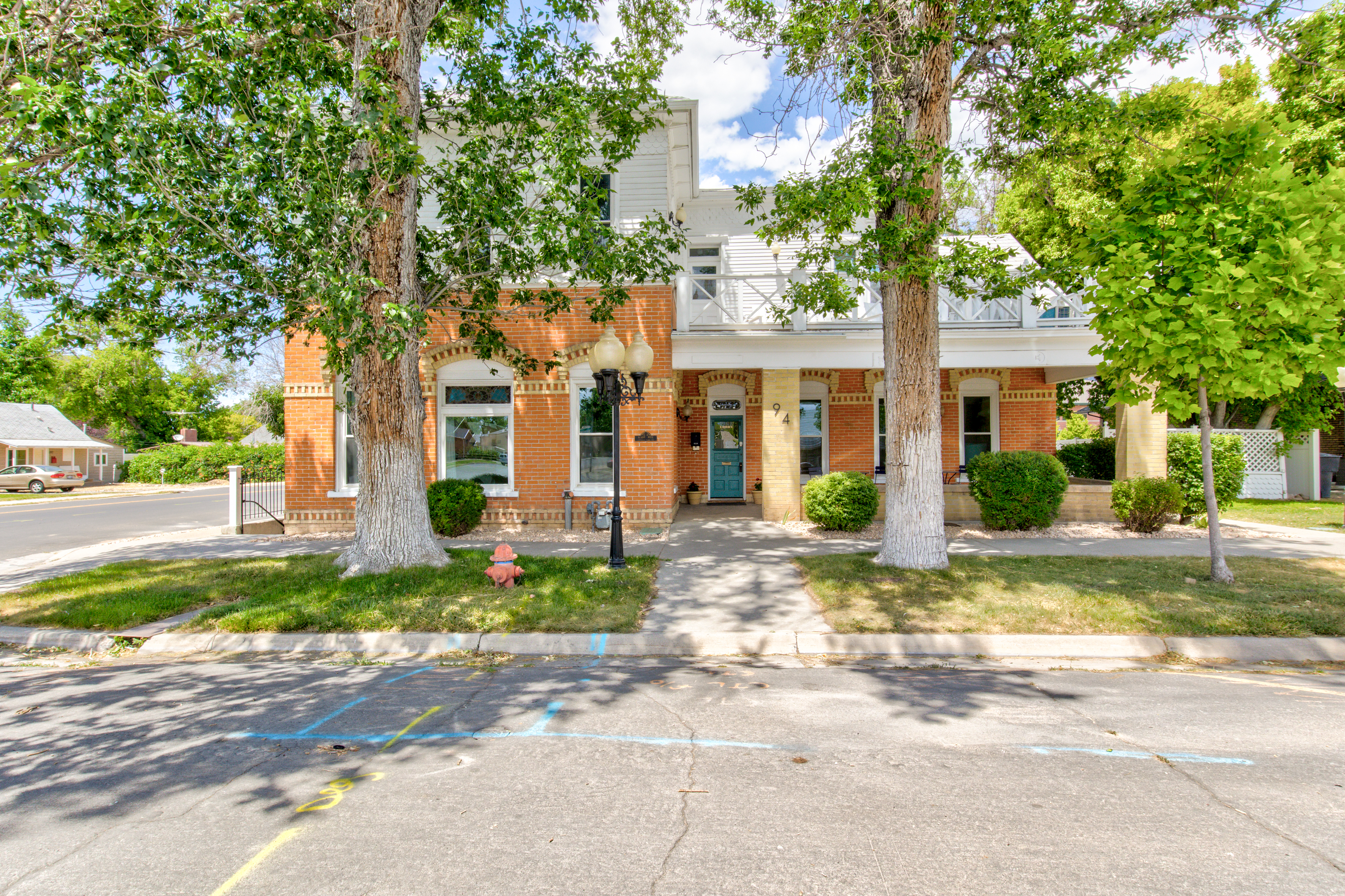
Art City Inn front view, July 2022

The hotel was originally built in 1892 by Moses (Mose) and Anna (Annie) Kearns Johnson. Construction required a $600 mortgage (equivalent to $21,500 in 2025) and eight years to complete. Moses was a prominent actor and the youngest surviving son of the founder of Springville, Aaron Johnson. At the turn of the century, the building was known as the Johnson Hotel and was one of three hotels in Springville. Two significant railroads, as well as the later mass production of automobiles, connected the town to the rest of the county, which created a need for accommodations for visitors. Springville's success in agricultural processing also increased the need for temporary lodging.

William Henry Kearns and Loretta Chase Kearns bought it in the early 1900s for $1,000, and added onto it, sometime between 1908 and 1925, the two-story rear wing and a utility porch. Since the completed of these two additions, the structure has not been substantially altered. Loretta and her son Howard were artists and while living at the hotel, they painted multiple pieces of art, now under the care of the Springville Museum of Art. William and Loretta named the building the Kerns House and ran it until 1937. (The Kearns House name is visible on the front of the building in a photograph taken by George Edward Anderson in the 1910s-1920s.)

Throughout the following decades, it would be run as an inn under the names of Kearns House, Manitou Hotel, Valley Tavern Hotel, and Valley Hotel, amongst others. It was listed on the NRHP January 5, 1998. In the early 2000s, most of the major systems were updated and it was then run as a Victorian-style bed and breakfast for several years. Finally in 2021, extensive renovations were started and then finished in 2022 to turn it into what can be seen today, with eleven private suites available for occupancy.

== See also ==
- National Register of Historic Places listings in Utah County, Utah
