= Howard L. Kearns =

American painter and printmaker

Howard LaSalle Kearns
- Born: March 17, 1907; Springville, Utah, U.S.
- Died: July 16, 1947 (aged 40); Salt Lake City, Utah, U.S.
- Resting place: Evergreen Cemetery; Springville, Utah, U.S.
- Education: Mission High School; California School of Fine Arts; Brigham Young University; College of the Pacific
- Occupations: Painter, printmaker
- Parent(s): William Henry and Loretta Chase Kearns

Howard LaSalle Kearns (March 17, 1907 - July 16, 1947) was an American painter and printmaker who specialized in watercolors and oil paintings. His artwork can be seen at the Springville Museum of Art.

== Life ==
Kearns was born on March 17, 1907, to William Henry and Loretta Chase Kearns in Springville, Utah. He attended public schools in Springville, worked as an organist at the Colonial Theatre in Idaho Falls, Idaho for five years, and graduated from Mission High School in San Francisco before attending the College of the Pacific. He was trained as a painter by B.F. Larsen at Brigham Young University.

Kearns became a regionalist painter and printmaker. He specialized in watercolors and oil paintings. He was also a piano and accordion teacher in Provo.

Kearns was a member of The Church of Jesus Christ of Latter-day Saints. He died on July 16, 1947, in Salt Lake City, at age 40, and he was buried in the Evergreen Cemetery. Shortly after his death, 173 of his paintings were exhibited at the Springville High School Art Gallery. His artwork was acquired by its successor, the Springville Museum of Art.
