= Museum of Idaho =

History and science museum in Idaho Falls, Idaho, U.S.

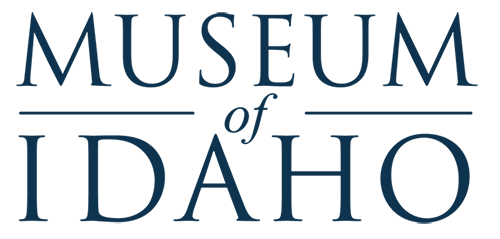
- Established: 2003
- Location: Idaho Falls, Idaho, United States
- Coordinates: 43.490679°N 112.0382058°W
- Type: history, science
- Visitors: approx. 90,000 per year
- Director: Jeff Carr
- Website: museumofidaho.org

The Museum of Idaho (MOI) is a history and science museum in downtown Idaho Falls, Idaho. The museum features exhibits, collections, and programs focused on the social and environmental history of Idaho and the Intermountain West, as well as prominent traveling exhibits on a variety of subjects. Its tagline is “bringing the world to Idaho, and Idaho to the world”.

The museum is a private nonprofit organization with approximately 12 full-time staff, 90 volunteers, and a 16-member board of trustees. The museum receives about 90,000 visitors each year and operates a store that sells books, educational toys, and souvenirs related to Idaho and MOI exhibits.

== History ==
The Village Improvement Society, a club founded by Idaho Falls women in 1898 to beautify and bring culture to the growing frontier town, secured a $15,000 grant from the Carnegie Foundation in 1913 to build a public library at Eastern Avenue and Elm Street. The Carnegie library was built between 1914 and 1916 and served the town until 1977, when the library moved into a new building. Meanwhile, the Bonneville County Historical Society (BCHS), formed in 1975, began displaying artifacts in a small room in the basement of the Bonneville County Courthouse in 1979. The BCHS lobbied to save the then-vacant library building from demolition, and raised money to transform it into the Bonneville Museum, which opened in 1985.

The historic building was listed on the National Register of Historic Places in 1984 as the Idaho Falls Public Library.

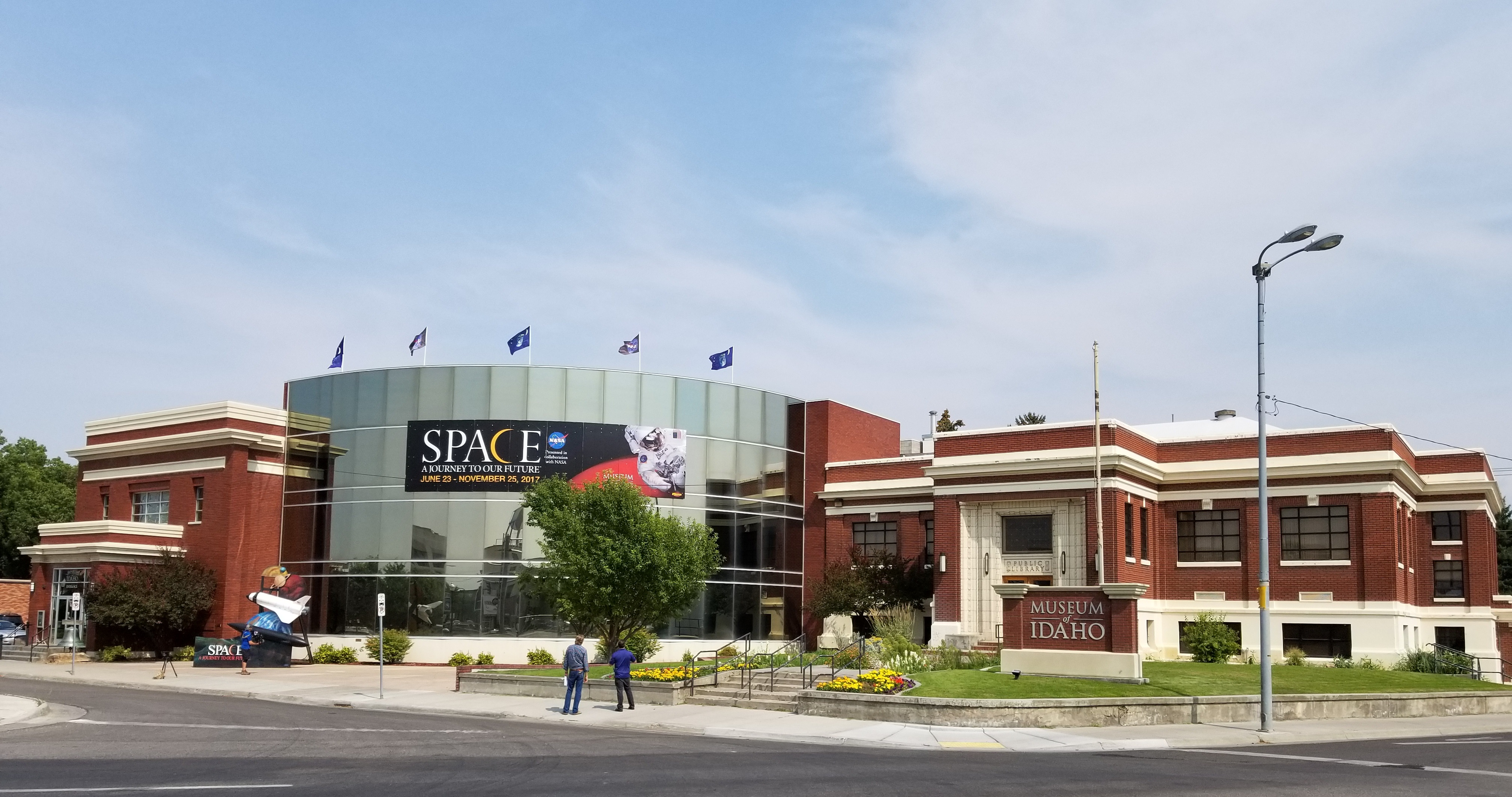
Picture of the Museum of Idaho

In 1992, in anticipation of future growth, the BCHS purchased property immediately north of the Carnegie building. In 2000, local philanthropist Greg Carr offered to donate the nearby former Masonic Temple to allow the BCHS to expand its building if they also agreed to expand its mission to include traveling exhibits and other offerings beyond Bonneville County's borders. A two-story atrium structure was built connecting the Carnegie building and the Masonic building, and the resulting institution opened in 2003 as the Museum of Idaho.

Since then, the museum has continually expanded its mission and offerings to include a wide array of educational programming. Following a capital campaign, the museum expanded yet again, opening a new traveling exhibit hall, education center, and lobby in 2019. The museum then undertook a wholesale renovation of the Carnegie and atrium buildings, which reopened with expanded Idaho exhibits in 2021.

== Exhibits and collections ==
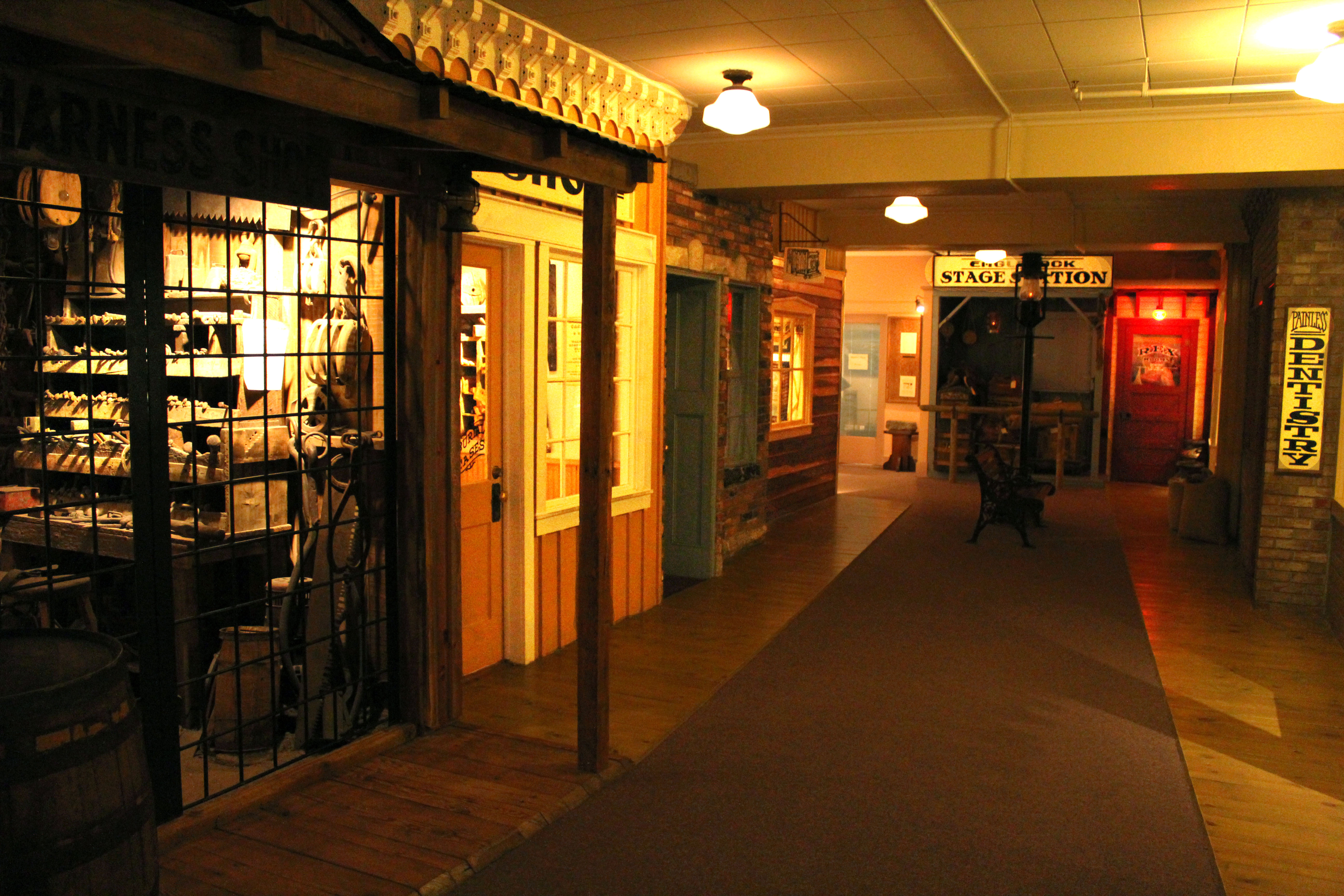
The "Eagle Rock, USA" exhibit represents ten local businesses from the late 19th century.

=== Idaho collections ===
The museum owns permanent collections pertaining mostly to Idaho history across several disciplines, including archaeology, paleontology, and geology, as well as native inhabitants and early settlers. Museum staff curates in-house exhibits centered around these collections. The museum also houses the archaeologically significant Wasden Collection, which contains thousands of objects and fossils, including mammoth and other megafauna remains excavated from an archaeological site in the desert west of Idaho Falls. Other notable artifacts include a life-size Columbian mammoth replica, a unique Revolutionary War-era American flag, the Northwest's oldest English-language monument, and remnants from the nearby National Reactor Testing Station's pioneering early research on atomic energy.

The museum's flagship permanent exhibit, "Way Out West," is divided into seven galleries:

- Idaho Origins (early Idaho history and fossils)
- Out of the Rocks (geology)
- Into Nature (flora and fauna)
- People & Places (including sections on the Shoshone-Bannock Tribes, trappers and traders, mining, homesteading, railroad, and agriculture)
- Regional Roots (including “Eagle Rock, USA,” a walkthrough of a street in the 19th-century frontier town before it became Idaho Falls)
- A Complex State (items pertaining to Idaho's statehood and issues of discrimination)
- Idaho Impact (Idaho technology and the state's public image)

The Marie Putnam Discovery Room includes kids' play areas relating to early settlers and natural history.

=== Research and archives ===
The museum houses an active collection and continues to collect artifacts, objects, documents, and photographs, as well as stories through an oral history project. The archives are open to the public and researchers by appointment. Archaeologists may submit proposals to perform research on the museum's Wasden Collection.

== Special exhibits ==
In addition to its Idaho exhibits, the museum hosts 1-3 special exhibits each year on a variety of themes. Most are national and international touring exhibitions.

- A T-Rex Named Sue (2003)
- Columbian Mammoth (2003)
- Discovering Idaho: The World of Lewis and Clark (2004)
- The World of Giant Insects (2004)
- Space Journey (2005)
- Secrets of the Cave (2005)
- Savage Seas (2006)
- Guns & Hooks (2006)
- Ink & Blood: Dead Sea Scrolls to the King James Bible (2007)
- Ice Age Mammals (2007)
- World of the Pharaohs (2008)
- Wheels: Are We There Yet? (displays on classic cars, motorcycles, and bicycles) (2009)
- Titanic: The Artifact Exhibition (2009)
- Lincoln: Preservation of a Nation (2009)
- Wolf to Woof: The Story of Dogs (2010)
- Decoding Da Vinci (2010)
- Bodies: The Exhibition (2011)
- A Grateful Nation: A Look Back at WWII (2011)
- Teeth, Tails, and Trouble: A T-Rex Named Sue & How to Raise a Dinosaur (2012)
- King Tut: Treasures of the Tomb (2012)
- Carousels: Art and History in Motion (2013)
- Guitar: The Instrument that Rocked the World (2013)
- Race to the End of the Earth (displays on South Pole exploration, organized by the American Museum of Natural History) (2014)
- Glow: Living Lights (displays on bioluminescence) (2014)
- CSI: Crime Scene Insects (2015)
- Real Pirates (2015)
- Hatching the Past: The Search for Dinosaur Eggs and Babies (2016)
- America’s Revolution: Rebels with a Cause (2016)
- Rome: Military Genius and Mighty Machines (2017)
- Space: A Journey to Our Future (2017)
- Dinosaurs in Motion (2018)
- Discover Steampunk (2018)
- Archimedes: Science and Innovations (2019)
- Darwin & Dinosaurs (2019–20)
- Body Worlds: Animal Inside Out (2021)
- Genghis Khan (2022)
- Toytopia (2022)
- Dinos of the Deep
- Under the Canopy

== Education and outreach ==
The museum hosts school field trips from Idaho and neighboring states, and develops exhibit-related lesson plans and activities for teachers to access online. It also holds summer camps, a variety of STEM-based and history-based programs and classes, as well as continuing education courses for educators that include excursions into the Greater Yellowstone area.

For adults, the museum also holds monthly "Museum After Dark" evening events, Haunted History Tours, galas, and regular public lectures on subjects in the humanities and sciences.

== See also ==
- Idaho Falls Public Library
