= Colonial Theatre (Idaho Falls, Idaho) =

Coordinates: 43°29′35″N 112°02′29″W

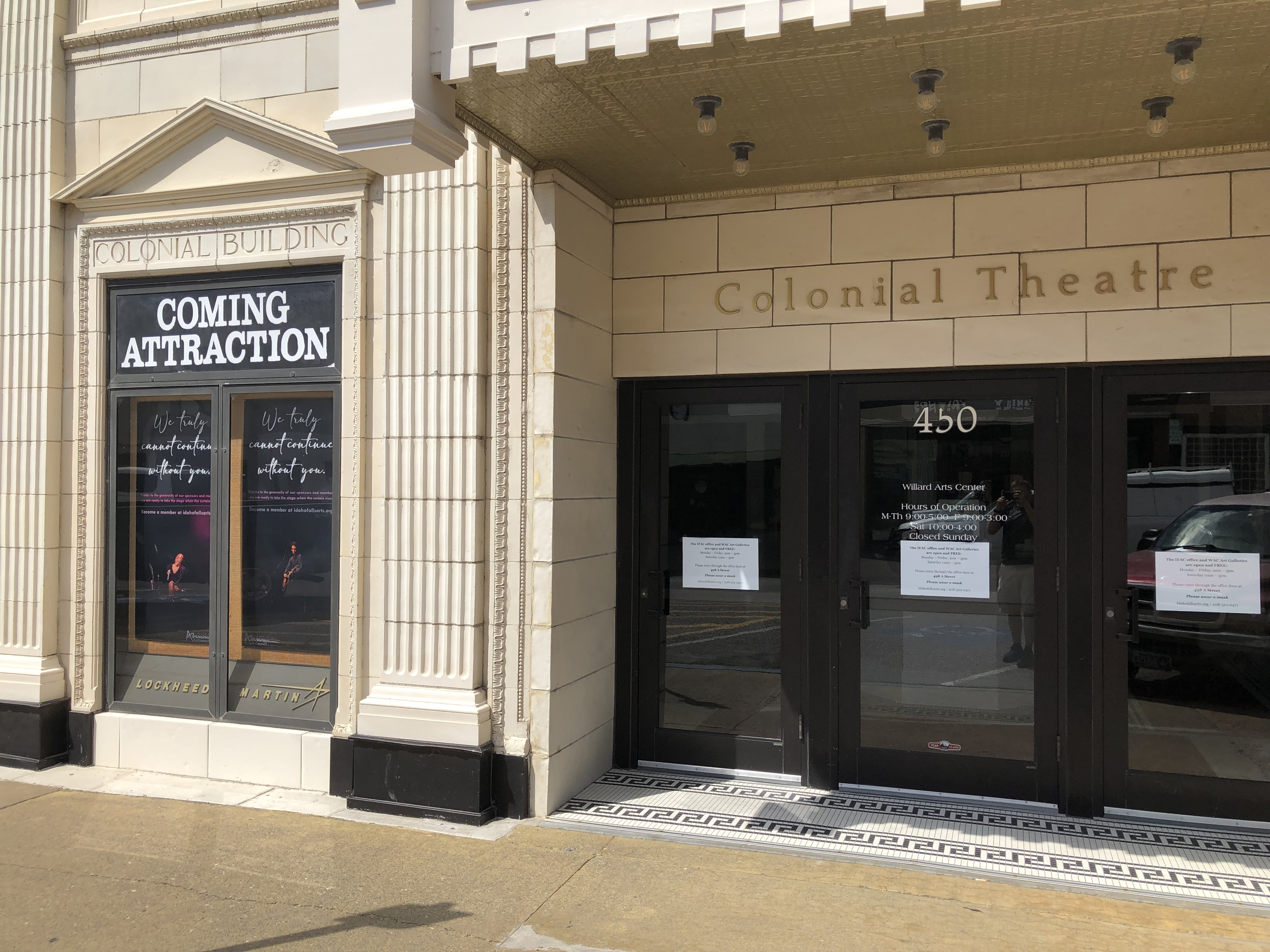
Colonial Theater entrance

The Colonial Theater is a historic theater in Idaho Falls, Idaho, founded in 1919 as a venue for live performances. From 1929 until 1990, it operated as a movie theater under the name The Paramount Theater. In the 1990s, the theater was renovated, and its original name was restored. It is currently part of the Willard Arts Center arts complex, owned and operated by the Idaho Falls Art Council.

It was built by Harry Brownback, a man whose family had played an early role in Chester County, Pennsylvania.

== History ==
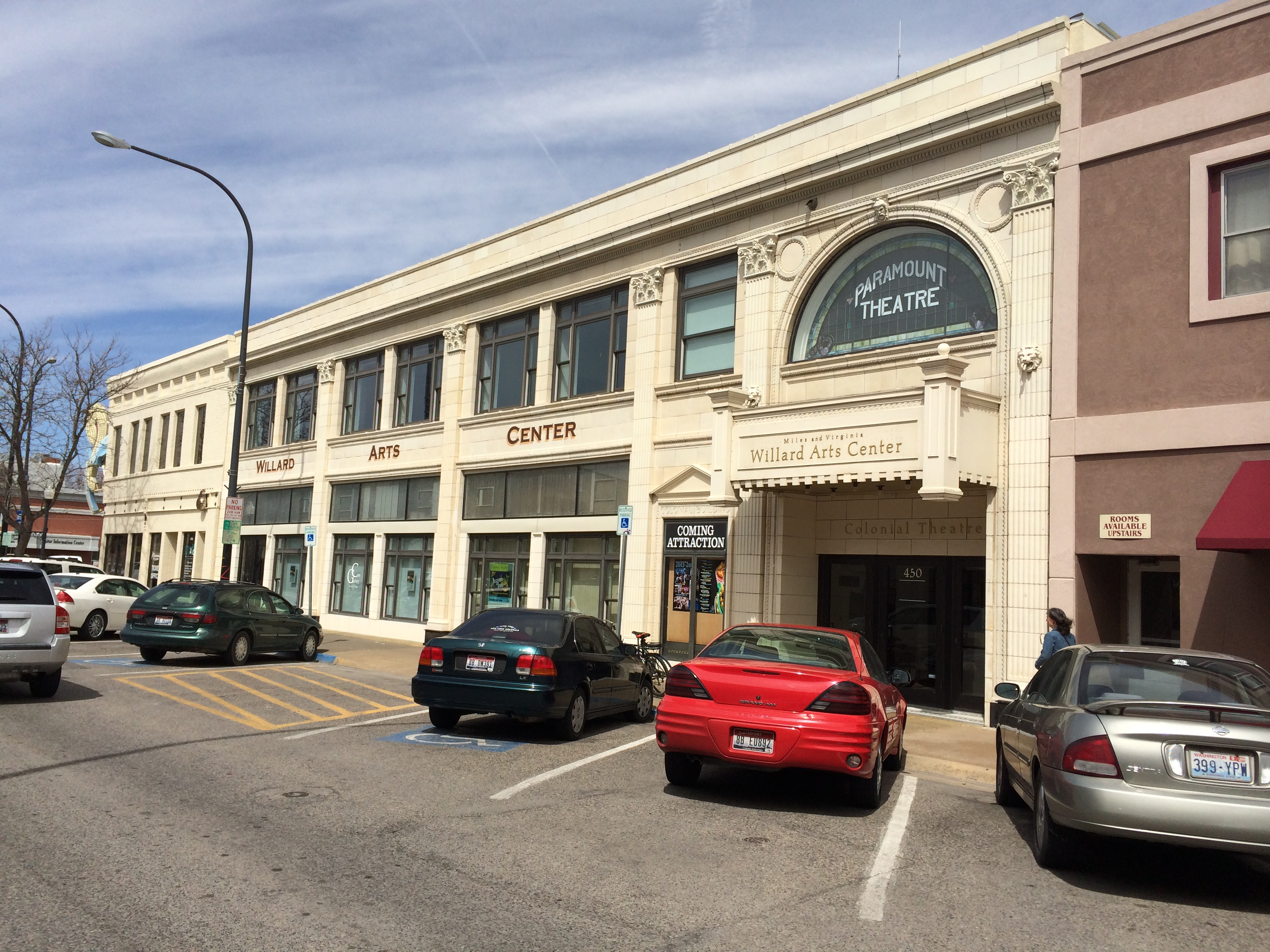
The Willard Arts Center, of which the renovated Colonial Theater is part

After the citizens of Idaho Falls voted to change the city's name, in 1891, residents began talking about building a theater which could host vaudeville acts, road shows, and musical performances. In 1919, three local men, C.A. Spath of the Farmers and Merchant Bank, Dr. C.M., Cline, and S.K. Mittry, a local contractor, put up the money and materials to build the Colonial Theater, at a final cost of $175,000. The structure was built of steel, reinforced concrete, and brick, with an ivory colored terracotta front. It was billed as the largest theater in the Intermountain West, with an orchestra pit, eight dressing rooms, and 1,400 leather-upholstered mahogany seats. A modern ramp led to the balcony where 600 of the seats were located as well as four box seats. Because the theater was designed before modern public address systems were invented, the acoustics were designed to be superb.

The theater opened on November 10, 1919, with the contemporary play John Ferguson, by Irish playwright St. John Greer Ervine. C.H. Lewis served as the Colonial's first manager.

In 1929, the theater was converted to a movie house, and renamed the Paramount Theater. The first moving picture shown at the theater was in November 1929, Harold Lloyd's Welcome Danger. It was originally a silent film but at its preview it was eclipsed by a one-reel comedy with sound. Through the 1960s and 1970s the Paramount continued showing the latest in motion pictures. The ushers would dress in costumes that reflected whatever movie was being shown. It was run as a discount theater in the 1980s and finally by 1990 it was in such disrepair it was closed down. The Paramount Theater remained empty until 1994. There was talk of leveling the theater and building a parking garage.

== Restoration ==
=== Administration ===
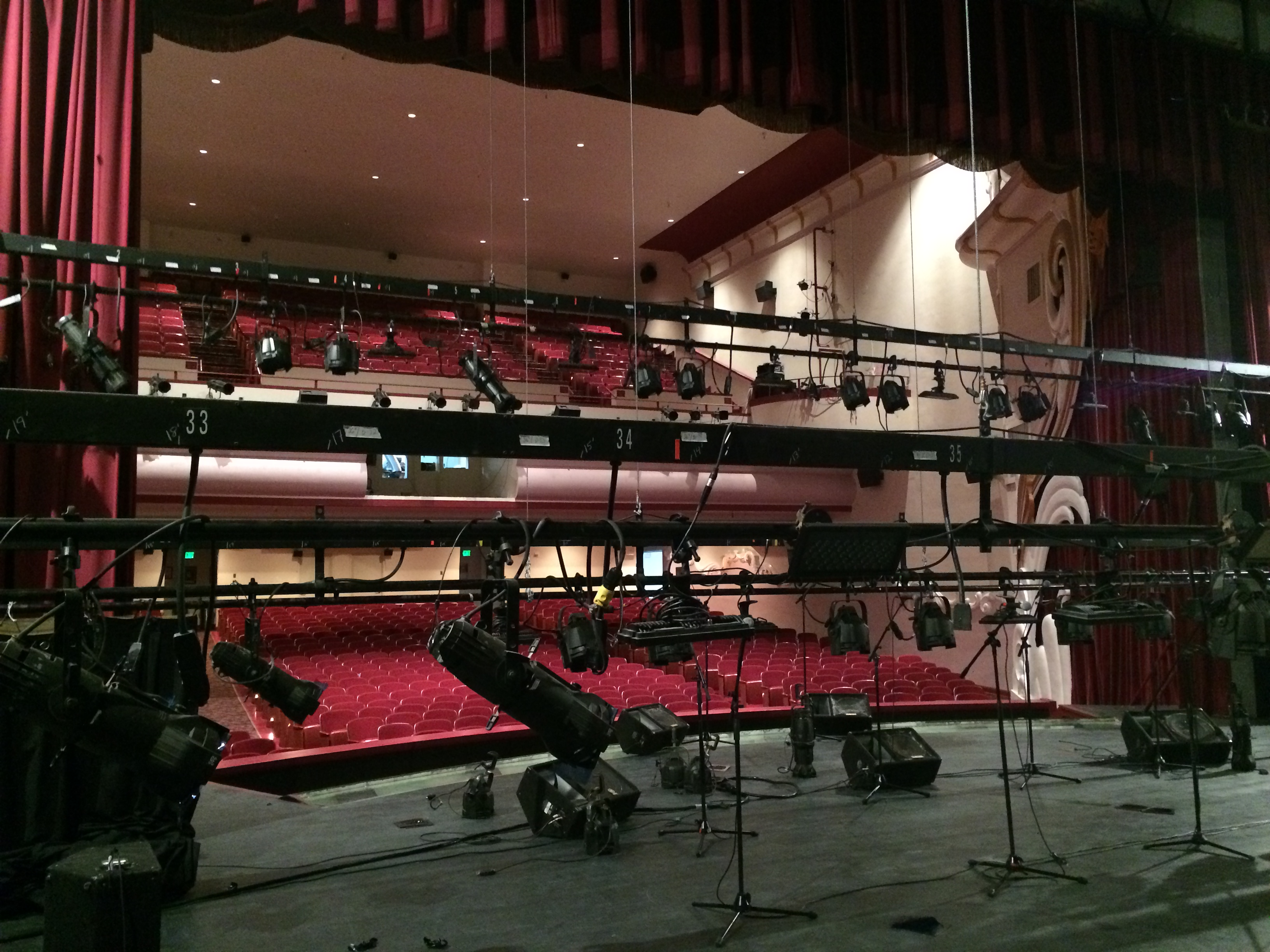
The modern stage of the Colonial Theater

In 1990, the Idaho Falls Arts Council was formed as a private, non-profit organization, with the mission to "promote, advocate, and present a broad spectrum of visual and performing arts in Eastern Idaho."

In 1994, the old theater's owners, Dick Clayton Sr. and his son Steve Clayton, donated the theater and adjacent buildings to the council. The Council soon launched a capital campaign to restore the space, which was deemed "the Phantom project." An anonymous donor, "the Phantom," had challenged the community to raise half of the total cost of the renovation by agreeing to match any donation to the center up to $950,000. The campaign was a success, and after three years, $4.2 million was raised to renovate the Colonial Theater and the adjacent buildings, turning them into a regional visual and performing arts center. The "Phantom" turned out to be a couple, Miles Jamison Willard and Virginia Willard, who also chaired the capital campaign. The renovated complex was named the Willard Arts Center, in their honor. When Miles Willard died on November 26, 2004, after a long battle with Alzheimer's disease, his viewing was held in the Willard Arts Center.

=== Architecture ===
During the Paramount Theater era, much of the theater's original architecture had been hidden. During the process of renovation, documents that appeared to be the original blueprints for the Colonial Theater were discovered in a downstairs wall; those plans helped greatly with the restoration. During that same period, a local tradesman informed the theater that there was a beautiful stained glass window under the tiles above the marquee in the front of the theater. People believe that the window was covered over during a 1952 renovation, after Fox Motion Picture Studios of Hollywood bought the theater.

Workers also removed the soggy carpet to discover black and white tiles running the entire length of the lobby. Work-release inmates uncovered the original 1919 Greek neoclassical border, which runs along the entire ceiling of the lobby. Arts Council staff cleaned and restored this border to its original beauty. The original footlights were at the front of the stage protected by Plexiglas and were the primary colors used to light the stage until 2014 when they were replaced by modern lighting. It was decided at that time that the theater would revert to its original vaudeville name The Colonial Theatre, and that live performances would reign once again.

On March 13, 1999, the renovated 988-seat Colonial Theater reopened to the public with a performance by jazz performer Ray Charles.

== The Colonial Theater today ==
Since reopening, the theater has hosted between 16 and 18 performances each year; it is also available for rental by the public. In 2014, the Colonial Theater hosted over 25,000 patrons.

The Colonial Theater is one of the only four historic theaters left in the state of Idaho; the other three are The Egyptian Theatre in Boise, The Panida in Sandpoint and The Virginia Theater in Shelley.

== Sources ==
- The Miles and Virginia Willard Arts Center. (2007). Colonial Theatre (1st ed.) [Brochure]. Idaho Falls, ID: Linda Guay.
- Idaho Travel Council Grant. (2007). The Miles and Virginia Willard Arts Center (1st ed.) [Brochure]. Idaho Falls, Idaho: Ron Paarman.
