= Idaho Falls, Idaho =

- City
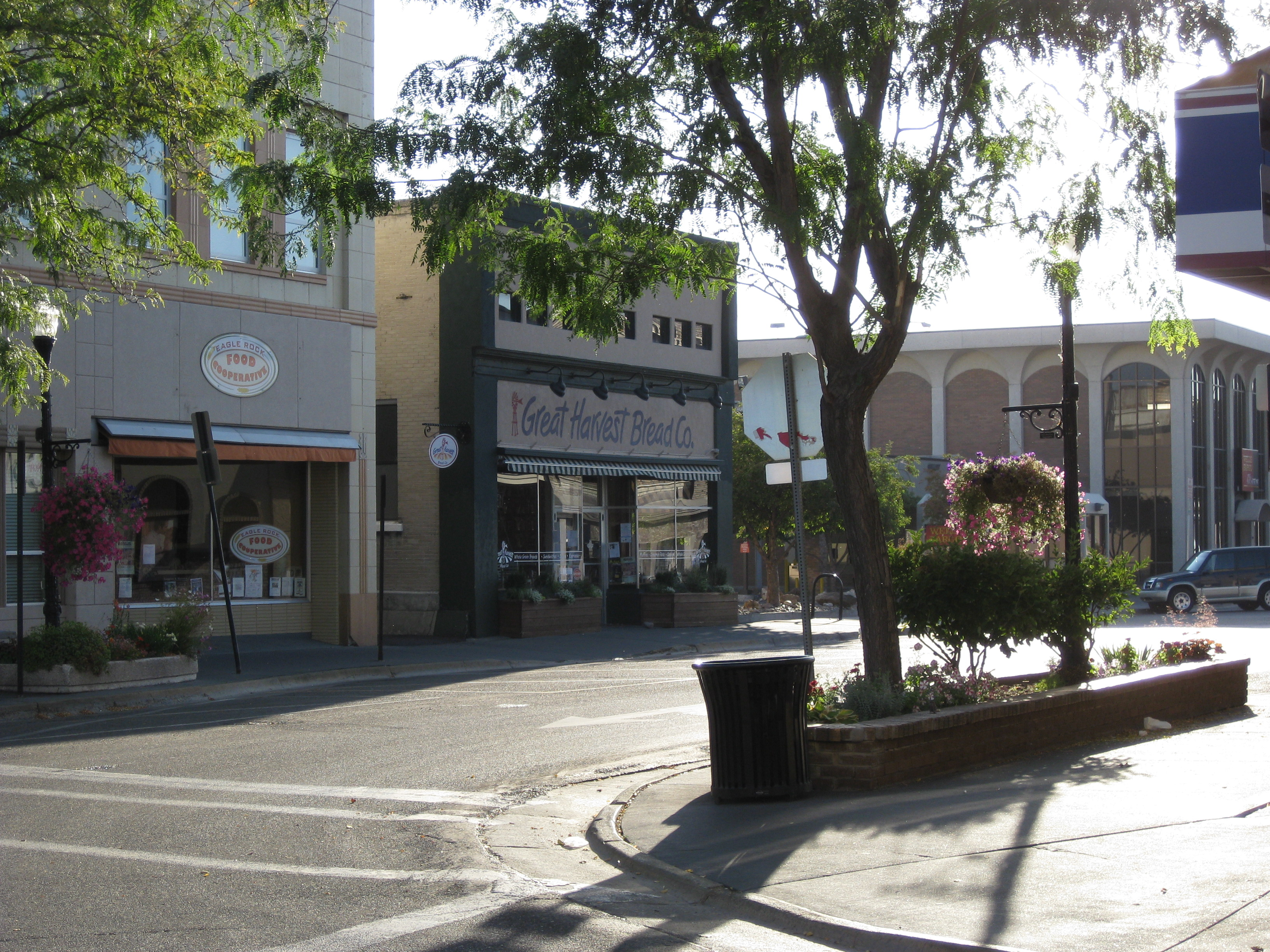
- Downtown Idaho Falls

- Seal

- Location within Bonneville County

- Location within Idaho Location within the United States
- Coordinates: 43°30′02″N 112°01′40″W
- Country: United States
- State: Idaho
- County: Bonneville
- Founded: 1864
- Incorporated: 1891

Government
  - Mayor: Lisa Burtenshaw

Area
  - Total: 24.55 sq mi (63.59 km^{2})
  - Land: 24.00 sq mi (62.16 km^{2})
  - Water: 0.56 sq mi (1.44 km^{2})
- Elevation: 4,712 ft (1,436 m)

Population (2020)
  - Total: 64,818
  - Density: 2,620.4/sq mi (1,011.75/km^{2})
  - CSA: 243,805 (US: 124th)
- Time zone: UTC−7 (Mountain)
  - Summer (DST): UTC−6 (Mountain)
- ZIP Codes: 83401–83406, 83415
- Area codes: 208, 986
- FIPS code: 16-39700
- GNIS feature ID: 2410091
- U.S. Highway(s): link = U.S. Route 20 in Idaho link = U.S. Route 26 in Idaho link = U.S. Route 91 in Idaho
- State Highway: link = Idaho State Highway 43
- Website: Official website

Idaho Falls is the fourth most populous city in Idaho and the county seat of Bonneville County. It is the state's most populous city outside the Boise metropolitan area. As of the 2020 census, the population of Idaho Falls was 64,818. In the 2010 census, the population of Idaho Falls was 56,813 (2019 estimate: 62,888), with a metro population of 133,265. As of the 2020 census, the Idaho Falls Metropolitan Statistical Area had a population of 154,855.

Idaho Falls serves as the commercial, cultural, and healthcare hub for Eastern Idaho, as well as parts of western Wyoming and southern Montana. It is served by the Idaho Falls Regional Airport. It is home to the College of Eastern Idaho, Museum of Idaho, Idaho Falls Idaho Temple, and the Idaho Falls Chukars baseball team of the Pioneer League, as well as the Idaho Falls Spud Kings. It is the principal city of the Idaho Falls Metropolitan Statistical Area and the Idaho Falls–Blackfoot-Rexburg, Idaho Combined Statistical Area.

== History ==
=== Montana Trail origins ===
The first European settlements in the area around Idaho Falls were sparse cattle and sheep ranches. No significant development took place until 1864, when a man named Harry Rickets built and operated a ferry on the Snake River at 43°36.112′N 112°3.528′W. The ferry served a new tide of westward migration and travel on the Montana Trail following the Bear River Massacre of Shoshone Indians in 1863.

Taylor's Bridge, c. 1870

The present-day site of Idaho Falls became a permanent settlement when freighter Matt Taylor built a timber-frame toll bridge across a narrow black basaltic gorge of the river 7 miles (11 km) downstream from the ferry. The bridge improved travel for settlers moving north and west, and for miners, freighters, and others seeking riches in the gold fields of Idaho and Montana –especially the boom towns of Bannack and Virginia City.

=== Eagle Rock ===
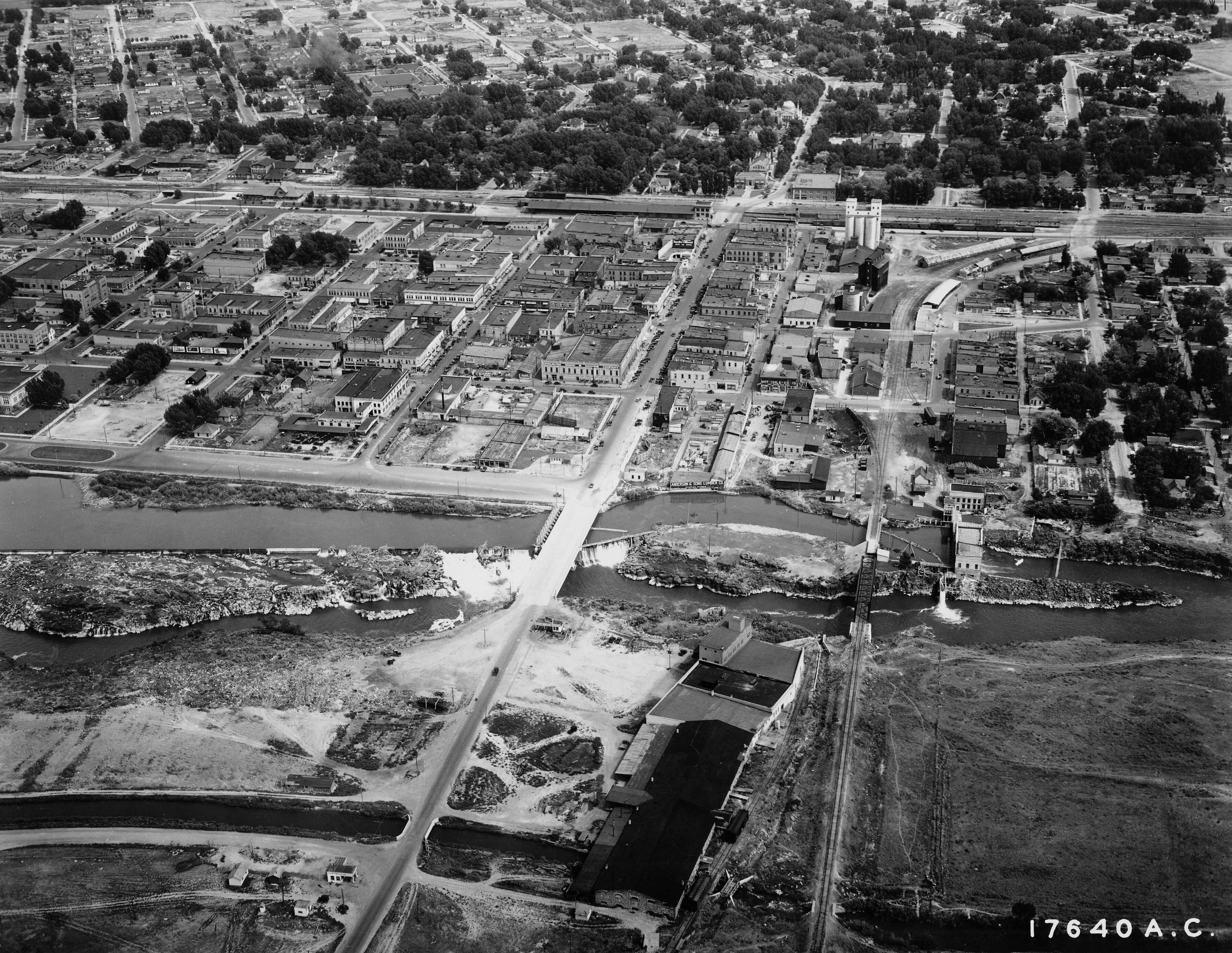
Idaho Falls, 1925

By the end of 1865, a private bank, small hotel, livery stable, eating house, post office, and stage station had sprung up near the bridge. The settlement was initially known as Taylor's Crossing, but postmarks indicate that by 1866, the emerging town had become known as Eagle Rock. The name was derived from an isolated basalt island in the river near the ferry, where approximately twenty eagles nested.

In 1874, water rights were established on nearby Willow Creek and the first grain was harvested. Settlement was sparse and consisted of only a couple of families and small irrigation ditches. The first child of European descent was born at Eagle Rock in 1874.

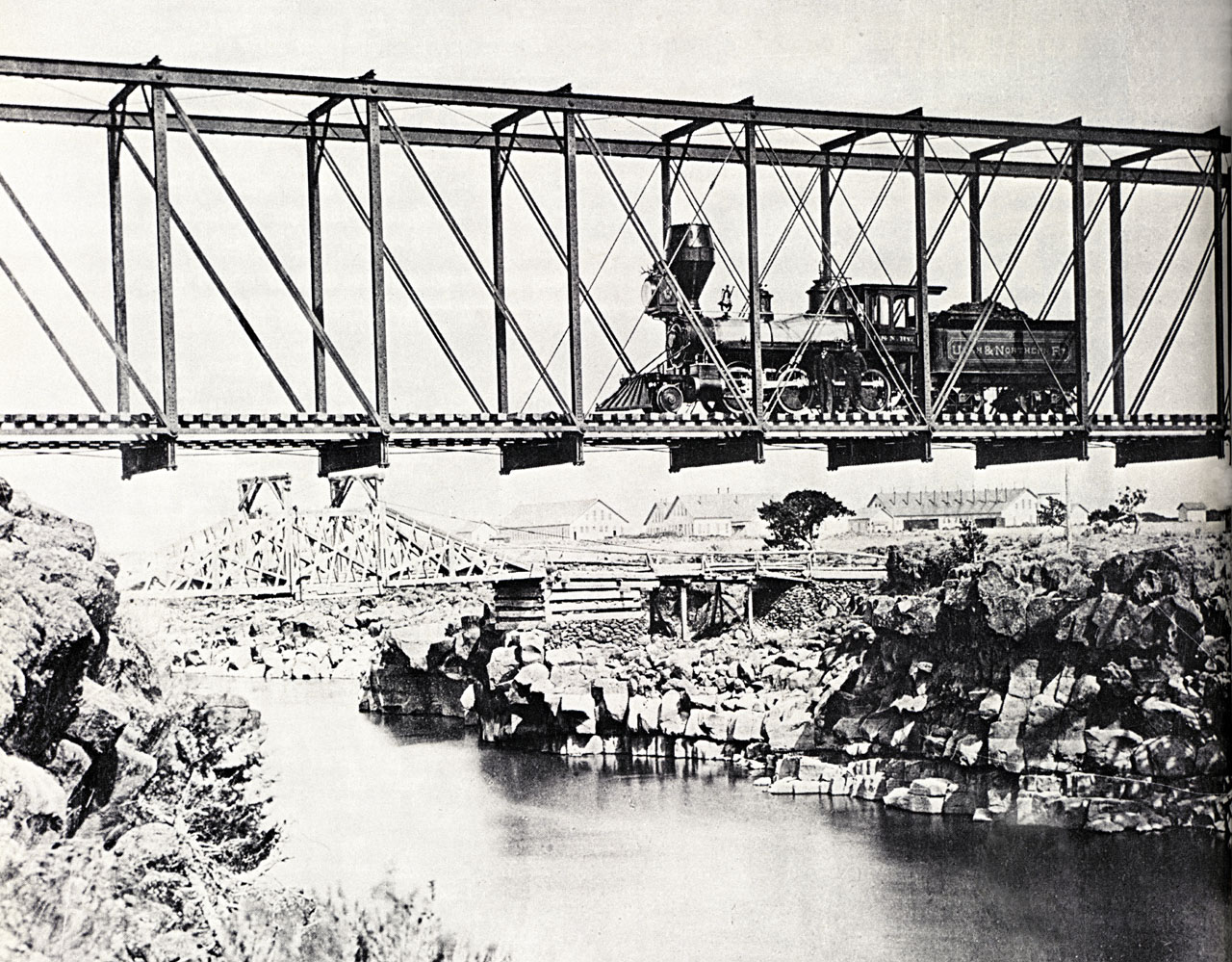
Utah & Northern Bridge, c. 1880, looking north, or upriver, with railroad shops in background

Soon, the Utah and Northern Railway (U&NR) was built, stretching north from Utah through Eagle Rock and crossing the Snake River at the same narrow gorge as Taylor's bridge. The railway would eventually connect to the large new copper mines at Butte, Montana. The U&NR had the backing of robber baron Jay Gould, as Union Pacific Railroad had purchased it a few years prior. Grading crews reached Eagle Rock in late 1878, and by early 1879, a wild camp-town with dozens of tents, and shanties had moved to Eagle Rock with a collection of saloons, dance halls, and gambling halls. The railroad company had 16 locomotives and 300 train cars working between Logan, Utah and the once-quiet stage stop. A new iron railroad bridge was fabricated in Athens, Pennsylvania at a cost of $30,000 and shipped by rail to the site, where it was erected in April and May 1879. The bridge was 800 feet (240 m) long and had two spans, with an island in the center. The camp-town moved on, but Eagle Rock now had regular train service and several U&NR buildings, shops, and facilities, which expanded and transformed the town.

As soon as the railroad came through, settlers began homesteading the upper Snake River Valley in earnest. The first new settlers carved out homesteads to the north at Egin (near present-day Parker) and at Pooles Island (near present-day Menan). The Utah & Northern Railway provided easy access, especially to homesteaders from Utah, who soon populated much of the area surrounding Eagle Rock. Some of these men had initially worked building the railroad, then later returned with their families to stake out new farms. These Utah families brought irrigation know-how developed in Utah's Great Basin settlements. Through their and others' canal systems, water from the Snake River made the Upper Snake River Valley into one of the most successful irrigation projects in the Mountain West. Large-scale settlement ensued, and within a decade, there appeared roads, bridges, and dams, which brought most of the Upper Snake River Valley under cultivation.

Then, in 1887, following the construction of the Oregon Short Line and a railroad workers' strike in Eagle Rock, most of the railroad facilities were moved to Pocatello, where the new line branched off the U&NR. This caused a sharp and immediate drop in population, which nearly killed the town. In 1891, marketers convinced town leaders to change the name to Idaho Falls in reference to the rapids below the bridge. Some years later, the construction of a retaining wall for a hydroelectric power plant transformed the rapids into waterfalls. On June 22, 1895, the world's then-largest irrigation canal, the Great Feeder (located 5 miles northeast of Ririe), began diverting water from the Snake River, helping to convert tens of thousands of more acres of desert into green farmland. The area grew sugar beets, potatoes, peas, grains, and alfalfa, and became one of the most productive agricultural regions of the United States. The city once again began to flourish, growing continuously into the 20th century.

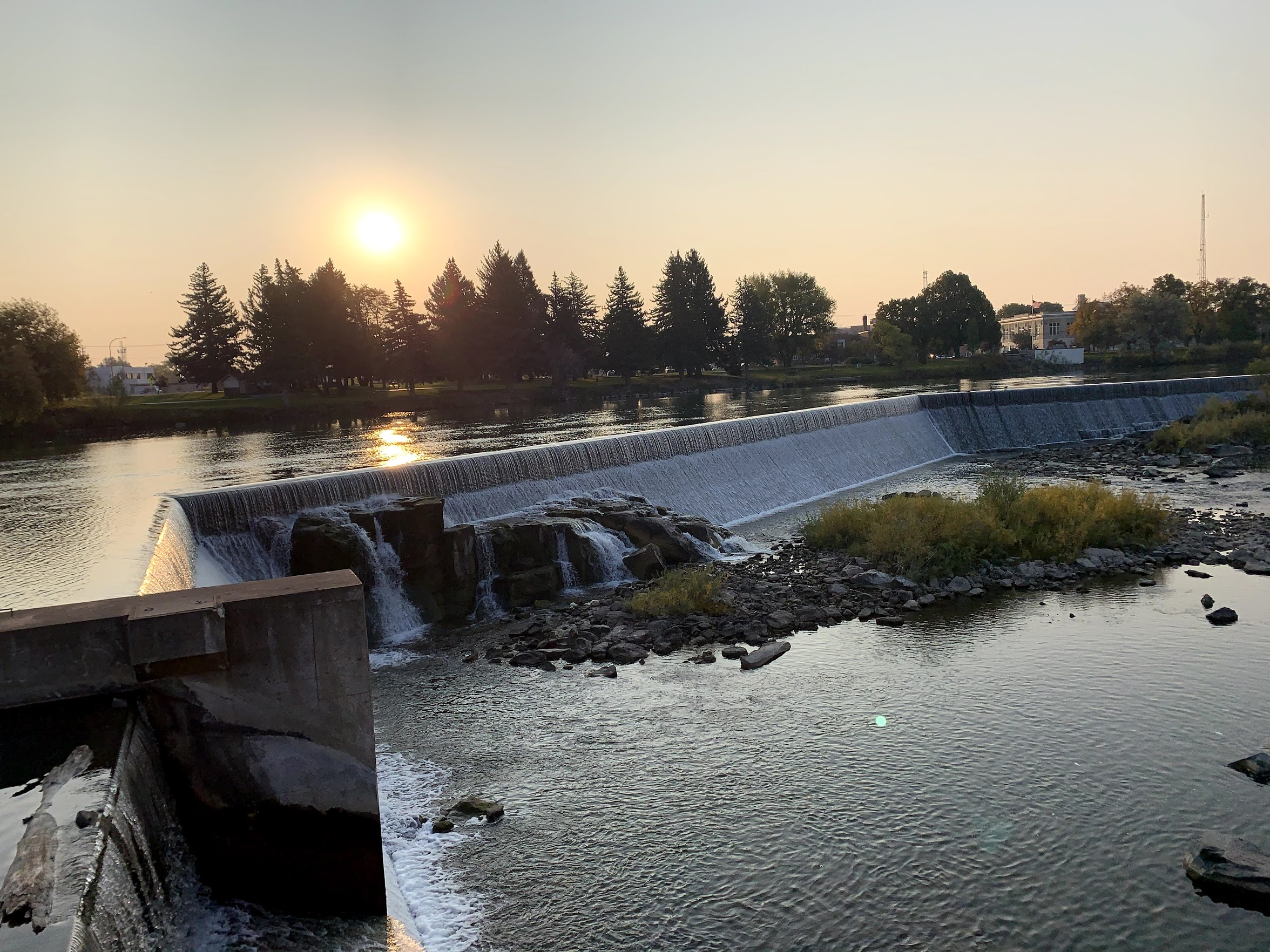
"Falls" on the Snake River

=== Nuclear reactors ===
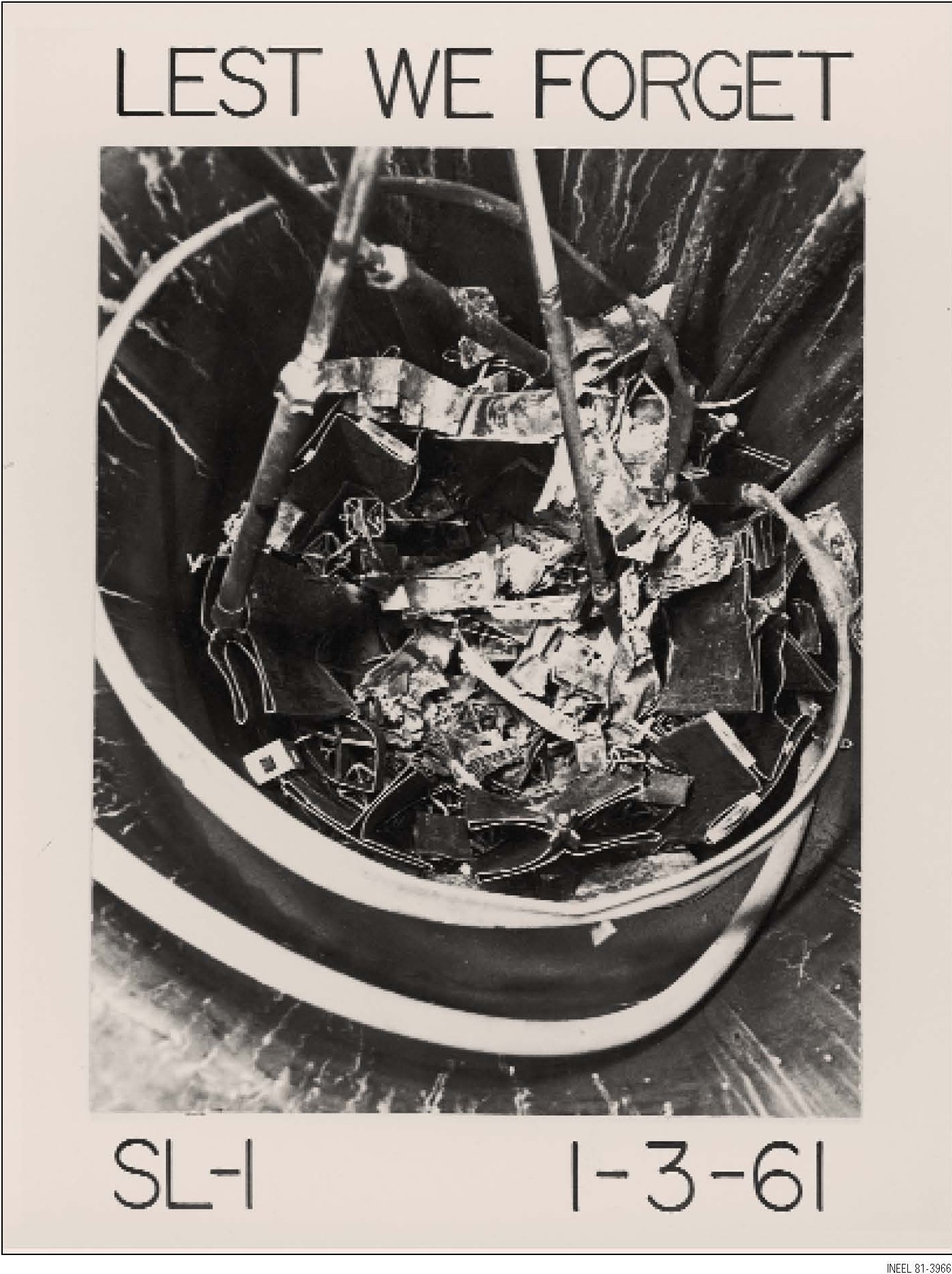
SL-1 reactor core in Idaho Falls following a 1961 accident that killed three people

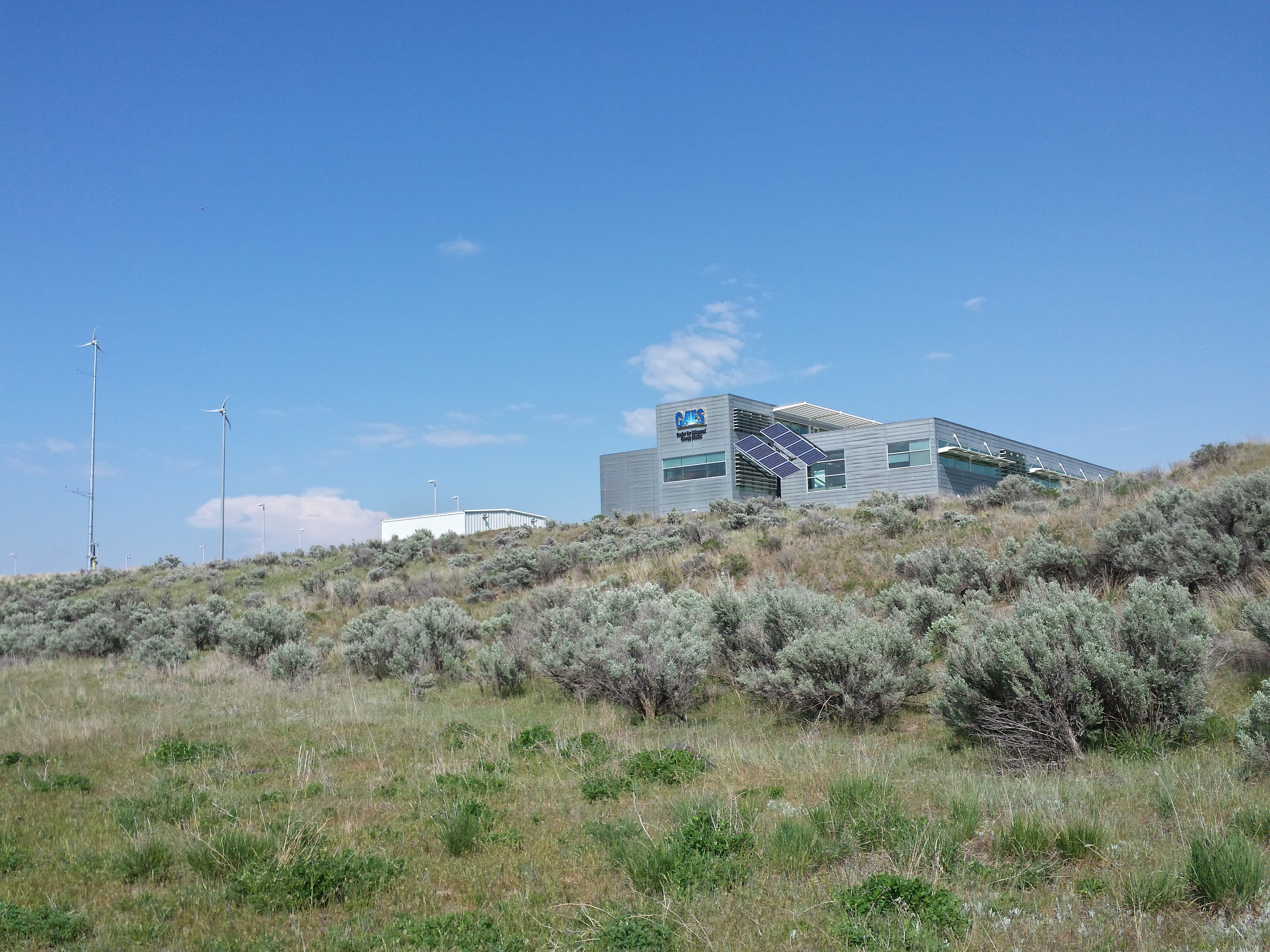
The Idaho National Laboratory, the University of Idaho, Idaho State University, Boise State University, and the University of Wyoming have labs, classrooms, offices, and other facilities just north of downtown. Among these partnerships is the Center for Advanced Energy Studies (CAES), shown here, which overlooks the Snake River.

In 1949, the Atomic Energy Commission opened the National Reactor Testing Station (NRTS) in the desert west of Idaho Falls. On December 20, 1951, a nuclear reactor produced useful electricity for the first time in history.

On January 3, 1961, NRTS became the scene of the only fatal nuclear reactor incident in U.S. history. The event occurred at an experimental U.S. Army plant known as the Argonne Low-Power Reactor, which the Army called the Stationary Low-Power Reactor Number One (SL-1). Due to poor design and maintenance procedures, a single control rod was manually pulled out too far from the reactor, causing the reactor to become prompt critical, leading to a destructive power excursion. Three trained military men had been working inside the reactor room when a mistake was made while reattaching a control rod to its motor assembly. With the central control rod nearly fully extended, the nuclear reactor rated at 3 MW rapidly increased power to 20 GW. This rapidly boiled the water inside the core. As the steam expanded, a pressure wave of water forcefully struck the top of the reactor vessel, upon which two of the men stood. The explosion was so severe that the reactor vessel was propelled nine feet into the air, striking the ceiling before settling back into its original position. One man was impaled by a shield plug and lodged into the ceiling, where he died instantly. The other men died from their injuries within hours. The three men were buried in lead coffins, and that entire section of the site was buried. The core meltdown caused no damage to the area, although some radioactive nuclear fission products were released into the atmosphere.

The site has since developed into the Idaho National Laboratory (INL), a national laboratory operated by the United States Department of Energy. INL and its contractors are a major economic engine for the Idaho Falls area, employing more than 8,000 people between the desert site and its research and education campus in Idaho Falls. Among other projects, INL operates and manages the world-famous Advanced Test Reactor (ATR).

== Geography ==
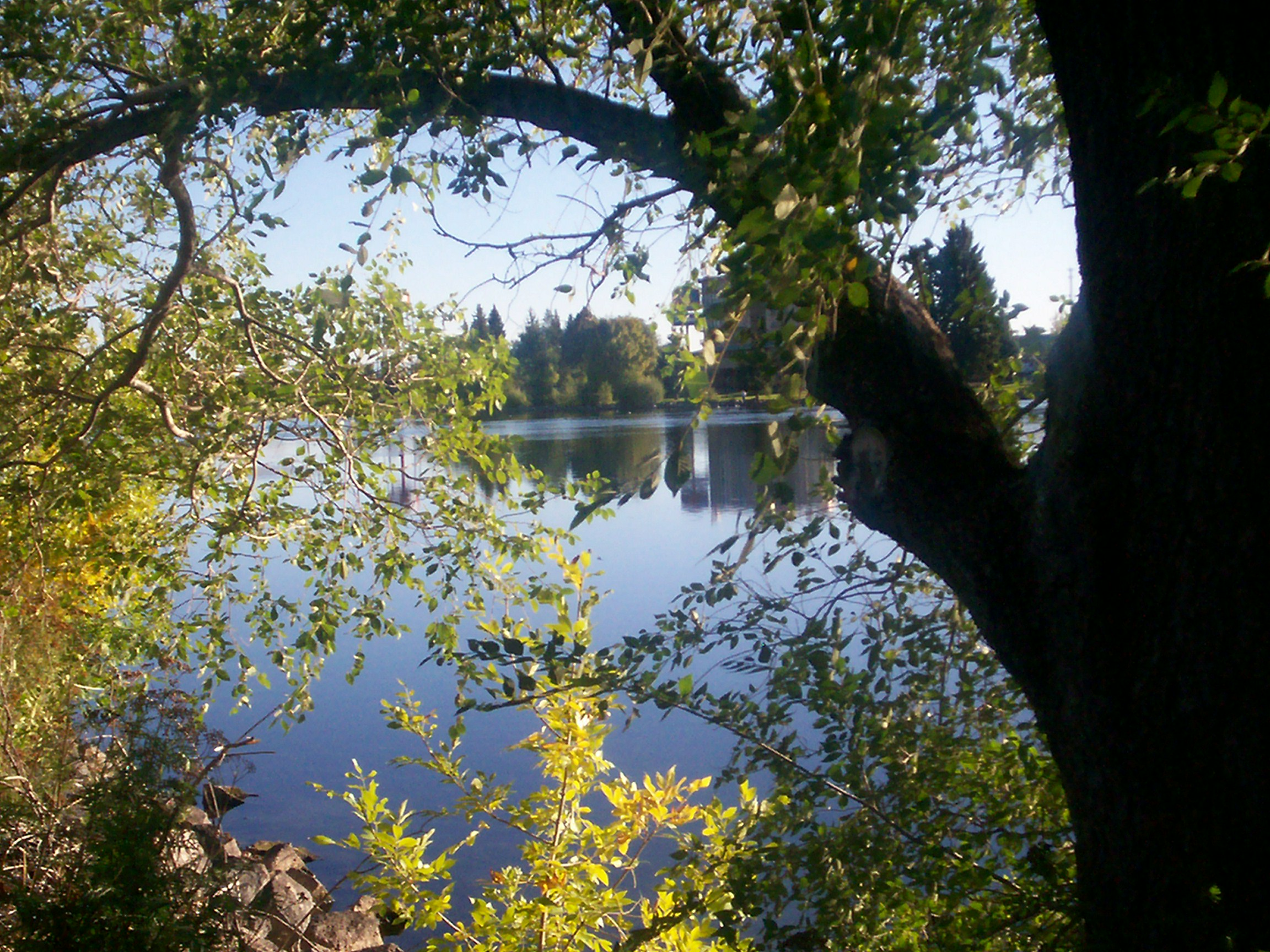
The Snake River seen through trees along the greenbelt

According to the United States Census Bureau, the city has a total area of 22.80 square miles (59.05 km^{2}), of which 22.35 square miles (57.89 km^{2}), 98% is land and 0.45 square miles (1.17 km^{2}, 2%) is water.

Natural disasters are rare in the area, although an F2 tornado hit the Idaho Falls area on April 7, 1978, causing up to $5 million in damage.

=== River Walk ===
Idaho Falls has an extensive river walk trail featuring running and bike trails, art installations, and points of interest along several miles of the Snake River. Formerly known as the "Greenbelt", the city maintains the area and periodically receives donations and grants that allow for expansion.

=== Neighborhoods ===
Japanese Friendship Garden

View of the garden from Eagle Rock Plaza

Entrance to the garden

Notable Idaho Falls neighborhoods include:

- Downtown - Historic downtown Idaho Falls sits on several blocks of the original townsite along the east side of the river. It features restaurants, plazas, shops, and cultural amenities including the Museum of Idaho, Colonial Theatre, Art Museum of Eastern Idaho, Idaho Falls Public Library, and Japanese Friendship Garden. It is home to the Idaho Falls Farmers' Market and many other community events.
- The Numbered Streets - The numbered streets area was the first planned neighborhood in Idaho Falls. The numbered streets run west and east between South Boulevard and Holmes Avenue. Kate Curley Park is located in the neighborhood, as is the Wesley W. Deist Aquatic Center and the Eleventh Street Historic District.
- West Side - The West Side houses the Idaho Falls Regional Airport.
- Snake River Landing - A large, mixed-use development on the west side of the river near I-15, which includes residential, restaurant, park, and community event space, including the Mountain America Center.

=== Climate ===
Idaho Falls experiences a semi-arid climate, bordering on a humid continental climate, with warm summers and cold winters (Köppen BSk). Precipitation is relatively sparse.

Climate data for Idaho Falls, Idaho (Idaho Falls Regional Airport), 1991–2020 normals, extremes 1948–present
Month	Jan	Feb	Mar	Apr	May	Jun	Jul	Aug	Sep	Oct	Nov	Dec	Year
Record high °F (°C)	57 (14)	62 (17)	78 (26)	86 (30)	94 (34)	102 (39)	103 (39)	100 (38)	101 (38)	88 (31)	71 (22)	58 (14)	103 (39)
Mean maximum °F (°C)	42.3 (5.7)	47.3 (8.5)	64.3 (17.9)	75.7 (24.3)	84.2 (29.0)	91.6 (33.1)	97.0 (36.1)	95.5 (35.3)	89.8 (32.1)	77.6 (25.3)	61.6 (16.4)	47.0 (8.3)	95.7 (35.4)
Mean daily maximum °F (°C)	28.7 (−1.8)	34.2 (1.2)	47.2 (8.4)	57.5 (14.2)	67.2 (19.6)	76.2 (24.6)	86.6 (30.3)	85.6 (29.8)	74.8 (23.8)	59.1 (15.1)	43.0 (6.1)	30.3 (−0.9)	57.5 (14.2)
Daily mean °F (°C)	20.4 (−6.4)	24.9 (−3.9)	36.2 (2.3)	44.4 (6.9)	52.8 (11.6)	60.4 (15.8)	68.0 (20.0)	66.5 (19.2)	57.7 (14.3)	45.0 (7.2)	32.4 (0.2)	21.9 (−5.6)	44.2 (6.8)
Mean daily minimum °F (°C)	12.1 (−11.1)	15.7 (−9.1)	25.3 (−3.7)	31.4 (−0.3)	38.4 (3.6)	44.6 (7.0)	49.3 (9.6)	47.5 (8.6)	40.6 (4.8)	30.8 (−0.7)	21.9 (−5.6)	13.4 (−10.3)	30.9 (−0.6)
Mean minimum °F (°C)	−10.4 (−23.6)	−4.3 (−20.2)	7.6 (−13.6)	19.2 (−7.1)	25.4 (−3.7)	33.5 (0.8)	40.8 (4.9)	37.5 (3.1)	29.0 (−1.7)	16.1 (−8.8)	3.9 (−15.6)	−9.2 (−22.9)	−14.6 (−25.9)
Record low °F (°C)	−51 (−46)	−38 (−39)	−16 (−27)	13 (−11)	17 (−8)	29 (−2)	33 (1)	28 (−2)	18 (−8)	−3 (−19)	−19 (−28)	−31 (−35)	−51 (−46)
Average precipitation inches (mm)	0.67 (17)	0.56 (14)	0.81 (21)	1.03 (26)	1.57 (40)	1.09 (28)	0.46 (12)	0.59 (15)	0.97 (25)	0.88 (22)	0.66 (17)	0.78 (20)	10.07 (257)
Average snowfall inches (cm)	5.8 (15)	6.8 (17)	3.5 (8.9)	2.3 (5.8)	0.6 (1.5)	0.0 (0.0)	0.0 (0.0)	0.0 (0.0)	0.0 (0.0)	0.8 (2.0)	7.2 (18)	9.9 (25)	36.9 (93.2)
Average precipitation days (≥ 0.01 in)	8.2	7.0	7.6	8.7	9.0	6.8	3.8	4.9	5.1	6.5	7.2	9.5	84.3
Average snowy days (≥ 0.1 in)	7.7	7.4	3.8	2.1	0.8	0.0	0.0	0.0	0.0	0.6	7.5	8.7	38.6
Source 1: National Weather Service
Source 2: NOAA (average snowfall/snowy days 1981–2010)

== Demographics ==
Historical population
Census	Pop.	Note	%±
1900	1,262		—
1910	4,827		282.5%
1920	8,064		67.1%
1930	9,429		16.9%
1940	15,024		59.3%
1950	19,218		27.9%
1960	33,161		72.6%
1970	35,776		7.9%
1980	39,739		11.1%
1990	43,929		10.5%
2000	50,730		15.5%
2010	56,813		12.0%
2020	64,818		14.1%
2021 (est.)	66,898		3.2%
U.S. Decennial Census

=== 2020 census ===
As of the 2020 census, Idaho Falls had a population of 64,818 and 24,090 households. The population density was 2,700.5 inhabitants per square mile. 99.7% of residents lived in urban areas, while 0.3% lived in rural areas.

The median age was 34.1 years. 27.4% of residents were under the age of 18, including 7.3% under age 5, and 15.0% of residents were 65 years of age or older. For every 100 females, there were 98.5 males, and for every 100 females age 18 and over, there were 96.5 males age 18 and over.

Of the households, 34.0% had children under the age of 18 living in them. 49.0% were married-couple households, 18.5% were households with a male householder and no spouse or partner present, and 25.6% were households with a female householder and no spouse or partner present. About 27.7% of all households were made up of individuals, and 11.2% had someone living alone who was 65 years of age or older.

There were 25,394 housing units, of which 5.1% were vacant. The homeowner vacancy rate was 0.9%, and the rental vacancy rate was 5.5%.

Racial composition as of the 2020 census
Race	Number	Percent
White	52,860	81.6%
Black or African American	437	0.7%
American Indian and Alaska Native	833	1.3%
Asian	870	1.3%
Native Hawaiian and Other Pacific Islander	93	0.1%
Some other race	4,671	7.2%
Two or more races	5,054	7.8%
Hispanic or Latino (of any race)	10,041	15.5%

=== 2010 census ===
As of the census of 2010, there were 56,813 people, 21,203 households, and 14,510 families residing in the city. The population density was 2,542.0 inhabitants per square mile (981.5/km^{2}). There were 22,977 housing units at an average density of 1,028.1 per square mile (397.0/km^{2}). The racial makeup of the city was 89.3% White, 1.0% Native American, 1.0% Asian, 0.1% Pacific Islander, 0.7% African American, 5.6% from other races, and 2.3% from two or more races. Hispanic or Latino people of any race were 12.9% of the population.

There were 21,203 households, of which 37.1% had children under the age of 18 living with them, 52.4% were married couples living together, 11.3% had a female householder with no husband present, 4.7% had a male householder with no wife present, and 31.6% were non-families. 26.5% of all households were made up of individuals, and 9.7% had someone living alone who was 65 years of age or older. The average household size was 2.63, and the average family size was 3.20.

The median age in the city was 32.2 years. 29.3% of residents were under the age of 18; 9.2% were between the ages of 18 and 24; 26.5% were from 25 to 44; 23.4% were from 45 to 64; and 11.8% were 65 years of age or older. The gender makeup of the city was 49.5% male and 50.5% female.

=== 2000 census ===
The 2000 census reported there were 50,730 people, 18,793 households, and 13,173 families residing in the city. The population density was 2,972.2 inhabitants per square mile (1,147.6/km^{2}). There were 19,771 housing units at an average density of 1,158.4 per square mile (447.3/km^{2}). The racial makeup of the city was 92.09% White, 0.62% African American, 0.76% Native American, 1.05% Asian, 0.06% Pacific Islander, 3.81% from other races, and 1.61% from two or more races. Hispanic or Latino people of any race were 7.18% of the population.

There were 18,793 households, out of which 37.5% had children under the age of 18 living with them, 56.5% were married couples living together, 10.2% had a female householder with no husband present, and 29.9% were non-families. 25.3% of all households were made up of individuals, and 9.1% had someone living alone who was 65 years of age or older. The average household size was 2.65, and the average family size was 3.21.

In the city, the population was spread out, with 30.3% under the age of 18, 10.1% from 18 to 24, 27.6% from 25 to 44, 20.9% from 45 to 64, and 11.1% who were 65 years of age or older. The median age was 32 years. For every 100 females, there were 97.9 males. For every 100 females age 18 and over, there were 94.8 males.

The median income for a household in the city was $40,512, and the median income for a family was $47,431. Males had a median income of $39,082 versus $23,001 for females. The per capita income for the city was $18,857. About 7.8% of families and 10.9% of the population were below the poverty line, including 12.7% of those under age 18 and 6.3% of those age 65 or over.

The top five ethnic groups in Idaho Falls are:

- English - 22%
- German - 16%
- Irish - 7%
- Mexican - 5%
- Swedish - 4%

== Economy ==
Idaho Falls serves as a regional hub for health care, travel, and business in eastern Idaho.

The community's economy was mostly agriculturally focused until the opening of the National Reactor Testing Station in the desert west of Idaho Falls in 1949. The city subsequently became largely dependent on high-income jobs from the Idaho National Laboratory (INL), known locally simply as "The Site." Since the 1990s, the city has added a significant retail, entertainment, and restaurant sector, as well as a regional medical center.

Idaho Falls hosts the headquarters of the United Potato Growers of Idaho and District 7 of the Idaho Department of Health and Welfare. It is the home to several small-to-medium-sized national corporations such as North Wind, Inc. and Melaleuca, Inc.

The median home price in Idaho Falls was $400,448 in 2026.

Public transport in Idaho Falls is run by the Greater Idaho Falls Transit, which runs the GIFT On Demand demand-responsive transport system.

== Arts and culture ==
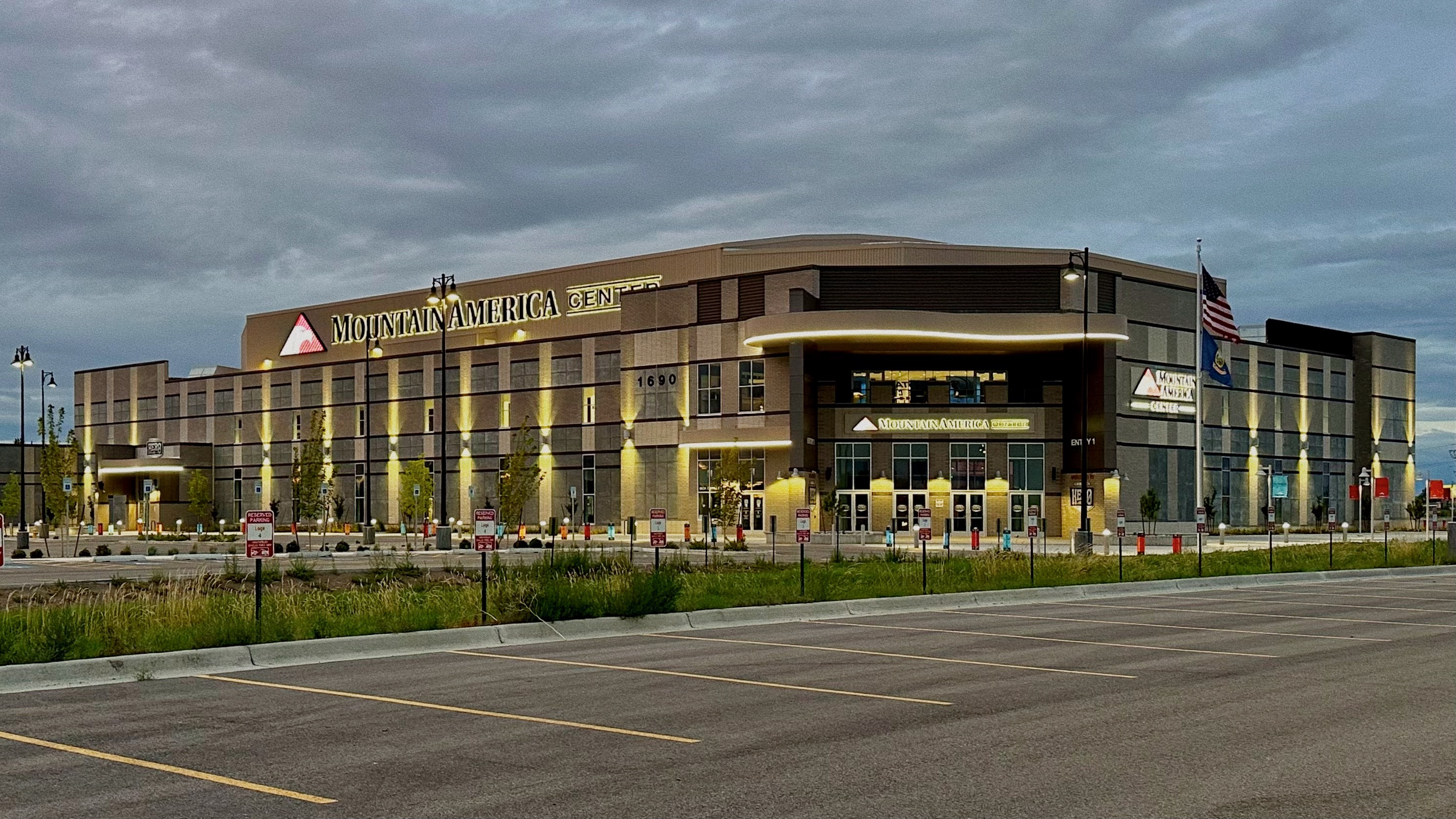
Mountain America Center

The Willard Arts Center including the historic Colonial Theatre as well as the Frontier Center for the Performing Arts host musical concerts, plays, and events. The Willard Arts Center also houses multiple art galleries. The Idaho Falls Arts Council owns or administrates these venues as well as The Artitorium, opened in 2014, which is an interactive art experience aimed at children.

The Mountain America Center, a multi-purpose arena and convention center, opened to the public in November 2022.

The Museum of Idaho showcases local artifacts and history. It also brings in major traveling exhibits such as fossilized dinosaurs, Gutenberg Bibles, Titanic remnants, and "Bodies: the Exhibition."

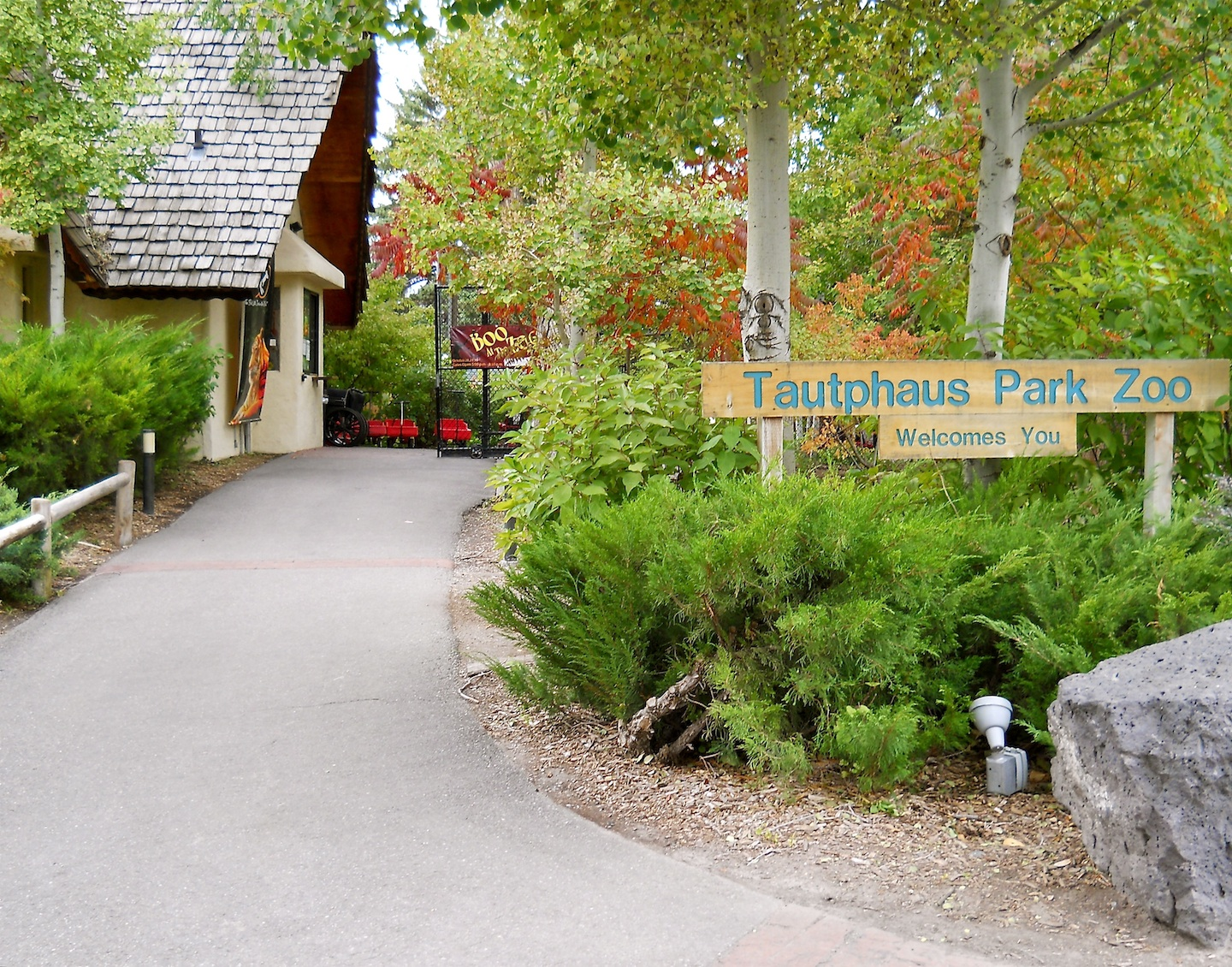
Entrance to the Idaho Falls Zoo

An interactive art exhibit, Art You Can Sit On, has been expanded over the years since the initial installation in 2003. It encompasses many art pieces throughout the city that you can also sit on, making it interactive art.

Tautphaus Park has hosted the Idaho Falls Zoo since 1935. It includes over 300 animals. The zoo also runs Funland, the fully restored mini-amusement park dating back to 1947.

== Education ==
=== Higher education ===
The College of Eastern Idaho was established in 1969 as a vocational-technical college named Eastern Idaho Technical College. In 2017 it transitioned into Eastern Idaho's only community college.

A campus of the University of Idaho in Idaho Falls provides access to the university's resources.

=== Primary and secondary education ===
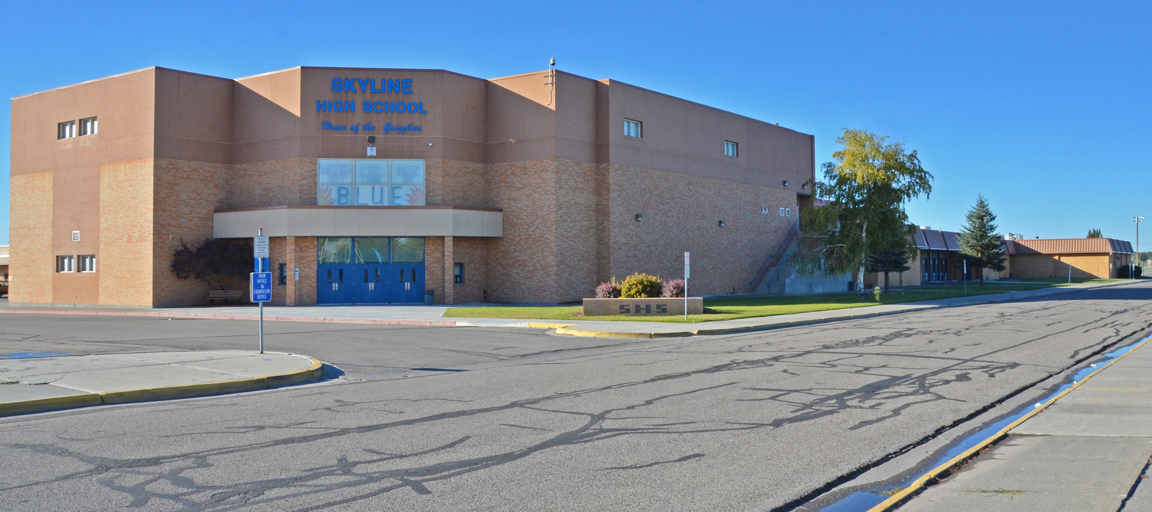
Skyline High School

The vast majority of Idaho Falls is within the Idaho Falls School District #91. A portion of Idaho Falls to the east is within the Bonneville Joint School District #93.

Schools located in Idaho Falls administered by the Idaho Falls School District #91 include:

- A.H. Bush Elementary School
- Career Technical Education
- Compass Academy
- Dora Erickson Elementary School
- Eagle Rock Middle School
- Edgemont Elementary School
- Emerson Alternative High School
- Ethel Boyes Elementary School
- Fox Hollow Elementary School
- Hawthorne Elementary School
- Idaho Falls High School
- Linden Park Elementary School
- Longfellow Elementary School
- Skyline High School
- Sunnyside Elementary School
- Taylorview Middle School
- Temple View Elementary School
- Theresa Bunker Elementary School
- Westside Elementary School

Bonneville Joint School District #93 operates multiple schools with Idaho Falls, ID postal addresses. Of them, one, Falls Valley Elementary School, is in the city limits. Some areas zoned to Falls Valley are zoned to Rocky Mountain Middle School and Bonneville High School while others are zoned to Sandcreek Middle School and Hillcrest High School.

Charter schools located in Idaho Falls:

- Alturas Academy

Each fall, the varsity football teams of Idaho Falls and Skyline compete in a rival football game called the Emotion Bowl. Each year, after the game, the winning team and its fans traditionally paint the goalposts of the stadium in their school colors (orange for Idaho Falls and blue for Skyline). Bonneville and Hillcrest participate in a similar event known as the Civil War.

== Media ==
The Post Register, a daily newspaper, serves the Idaho Falls area. Online news outlet East Idaho News also provides digital news coverage focused on eastern Idaho communities. The region is also home to more than a dozen AM and FM stations. Five major network affiliates serve the Idaho Falls/Pocatello television market: KIDK (MeTV, with a simulcast of Fox affiliate KXPI-LD on DT2), KIFI-TV (ABC with CBS on DT2, The CW Plus on DT3 and Telemundo on DT5), KPVI-DT (NBC, licensed to Pocatello), and Idaho Public Television.

== Notable people ==
- Chandler Brossard — beat novelist, author of Who Walk in Darkness
- Gregory C. Carr — telecommunications entrepreneur and philanthropist
- Steven E. Carr — only American ever elected to Standing Commission of International Red Cross and Red Crescent Movement
- Barzilla W. Clark — governor of Idaho 1937–1939; mayor of Idaho Falls 1913–15, 1926–36
- Chase A. Clark — governor of Idaho 1940–1942; mayor of Idaho Falls 1937–1938, U.S. district judge 1943–1966
- D. Worth Clark — U.S. senator 1939–1945, U.S. congressman 1935–1939
- Bethine Clark Church — daughter of Chase A. Clark and wife of Frank Church
- Mike Crapo — U.S. senator 1999–present; U.S. congressman 1993–1999
- Dame Darcy — cartoonist and author of Meatcake
- Jared Gold — fashion designer featured on America's Next Top Model
- Gregg Hale — guitar player for British band Spiritualized
- Michael Jon Hand — former CIA operative, arms dealer, drug dealer and international fugitive
- Orval Hansen — U.S. congressman 1969–1975
- Mary Kornman — actress known for Our Gang comedies
- Rachel Martin — NPR journalist, host of Morning Edition
- Janice McGeachin — Lieutenant governor of Idaho 2019–2023
- Edgar Miller — designer and artist
- Yo Murphy — former CFL/NFL wide receiver
- David Neiwert — freelance journalist and blogger
- Ryan Nelson — federal judge, U.S. Court of Appeals for the Ninth Circuit (2018–present)
- Todd Pedersen — Founder Of Vivint Security
- Martha Raddatz — ABC News chief global affairs correspondent, recipient of four Emmy Awards
- Wilson Rawls — author of Where the Red Fern Grows and Summer of the Monkeys
- Richard Rusczyk — founder and former CEO of Art of Problem Solving Inc.
- Brandi Sherwood — Miss Idaho Teen USA 1989, Miss Teen USA 1989, Miss Idaho USA 1997, Miss USA 1997 (succeeded)
- Mike Simpson — U.S. Congress 1999–present; speaker of the Idaho House of Representatives 1992–1988; Idaho representative 1984–1998
- John L. Smith — head football coach at Michigan State, Louisville, Utah State, Idaho, and Arkansas
- Frank L. VanderSloot — businessman, owner of Melaleuca Inc.

== Sister city ==
Idaho Falls has a sister city, as designated by Sister Cities International:

- Tokai, Ibaraki, Japan

== Gallery ==
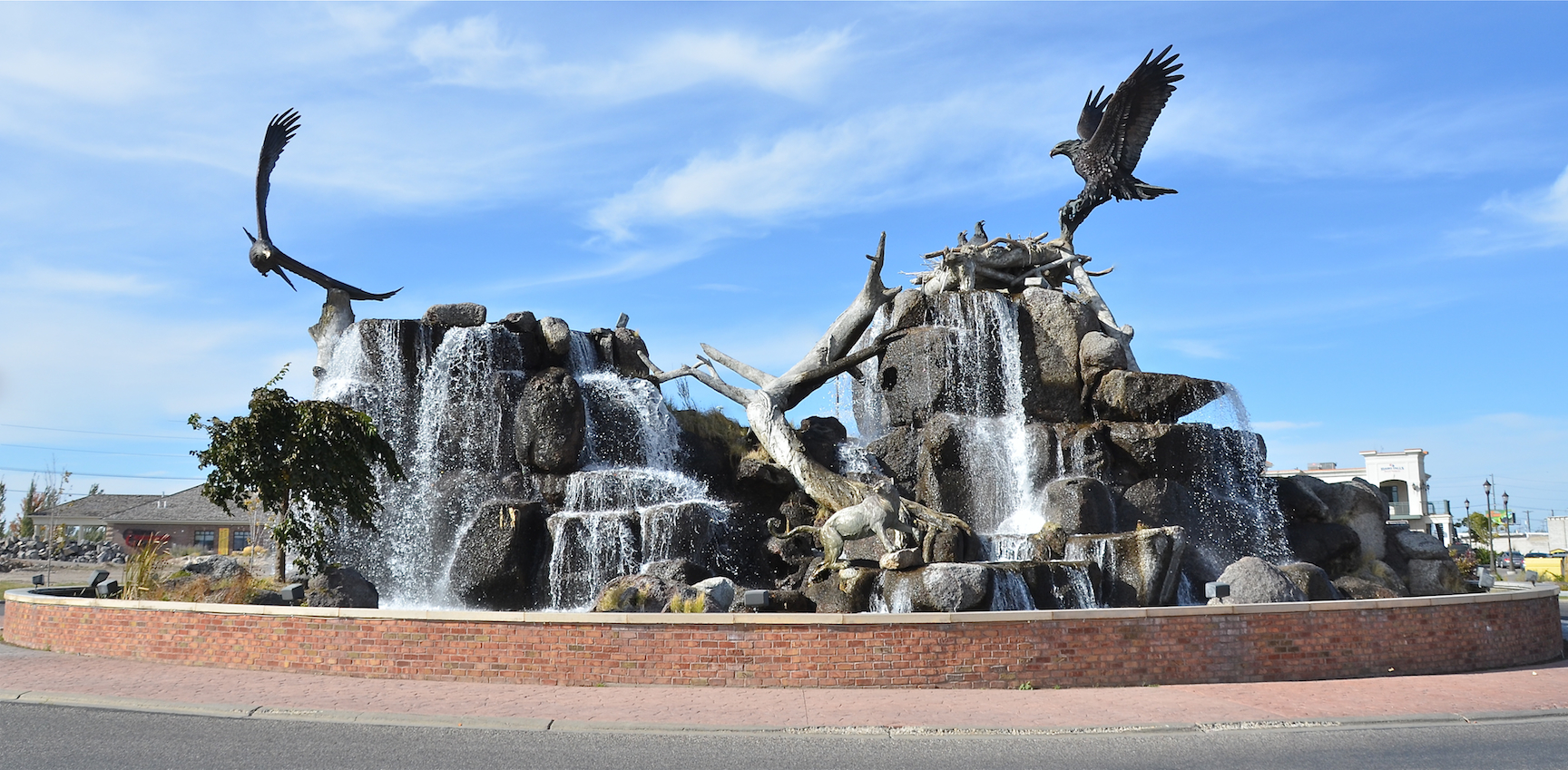
Fountain and sculpture on Utah Avenue Roundabout in Idaho Falls

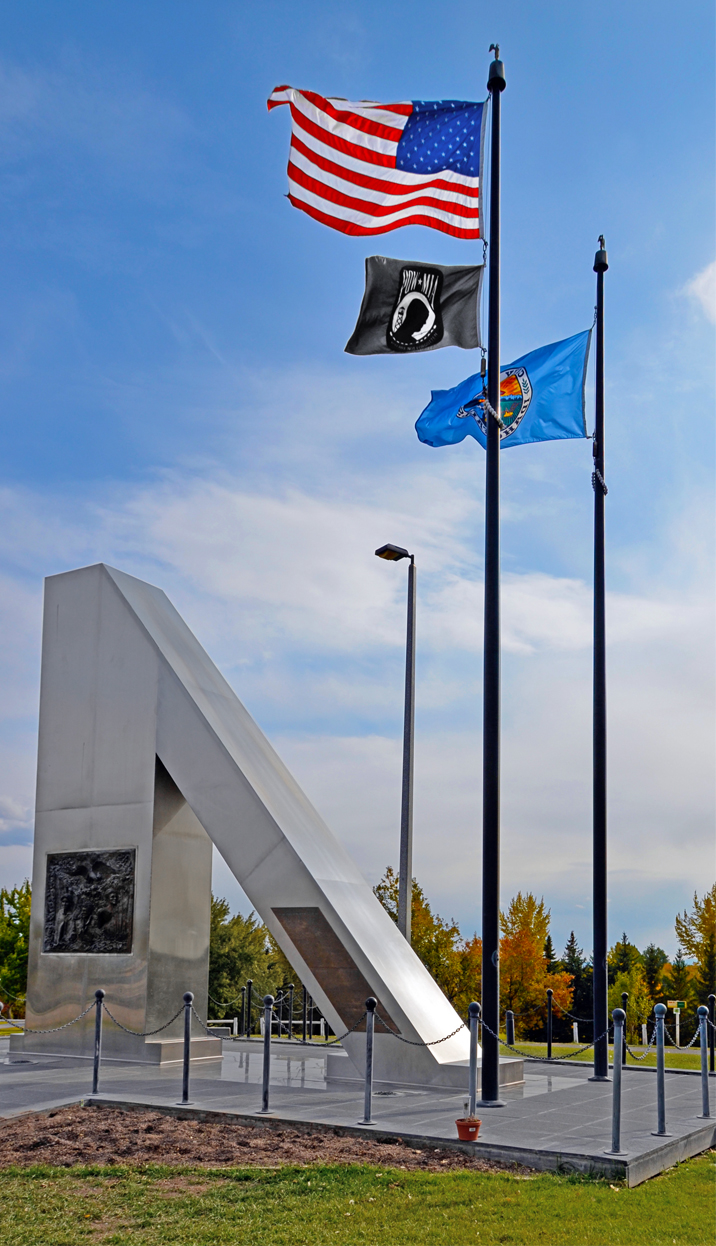
Idaho State Vietnam Veterans Memorial in Freeman Park

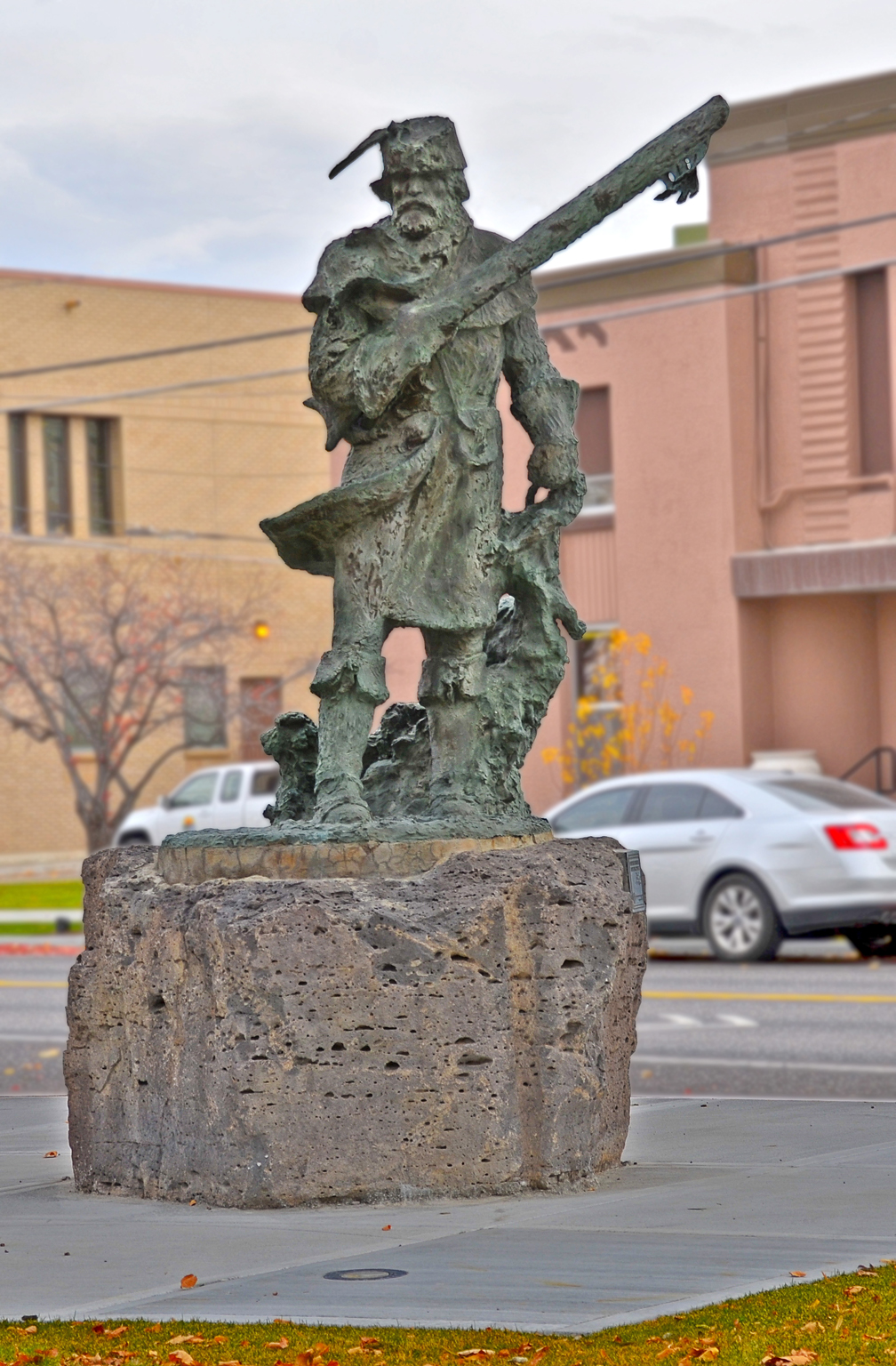
Sculpture of Snake River Fur Trapper by Roy Reynolds on the bank of the Snake River (along the River Walk) in Idaho Falls

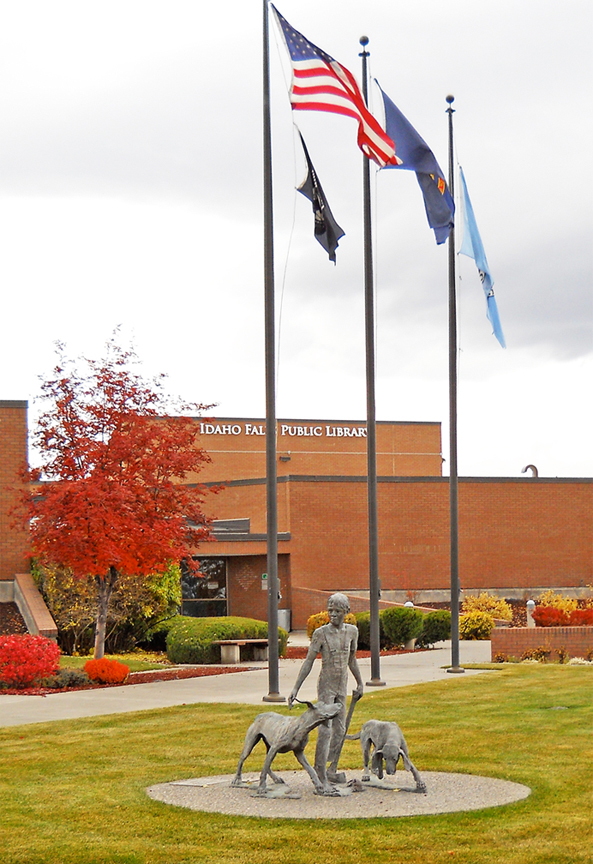
Idaho Falls Library; sculpture by Marilyn Hoff Hansen dedicated to Wilson Rawls, author of Where the Red Fern Grows
